= Mary Evelyn =

English letter writer and wife of John Evelyn

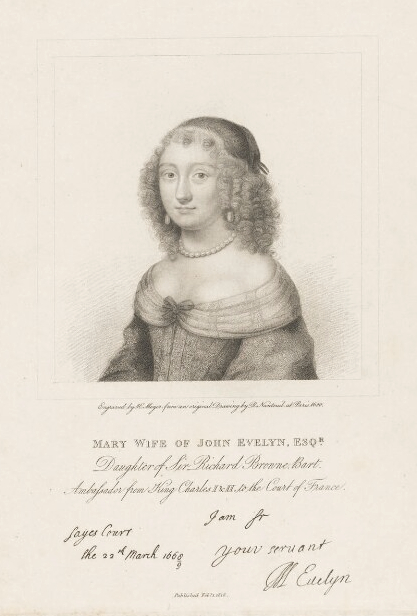
Mary Evelyn, 19th-century engraving after a 1651 portrait by Robert Nanteuil

Mary Evelyn (née Browne; 1632–1709) was an English letter writer. She was the wife of the English diarist and intellectual John Evelyn. Described as a woman of "acute intelligence and tangible warmth", Mary earned praise throughout her life as a skilled artist, wife and mother, and homemaker. She is known also for her letters to the Oxford don Ralph Bohun.

== Early life ==
Mary Browne was born in England in 1632, the daughter of Sir Richard Browne, 1st Baronet Deptford, and his wife Elizabeth Prettyman. On her mother's side, she had established ties to the Suffolk gentry, while her father's family held the estate of Sayes Court in Deptford, coming from a long line of professional courtiers. In 1641, Browne was sent to Paris as the English Ambassador to the French Court for Charles I, his family accompanying him. Mary's French upbringing had a profound impact on her later life, and she was often praised for her skills with the French language and Continental manners.

Following the outbreak of the English Civil War, the Brown family remained in Paris and maintained their strong Royalist ties. Their Parisian home served as a safe haven and social centre for Royalist Exiles who fled England during this period, despite a lack of financial support from the King.

== Marriage ==
At 11 years old, Mary was first introduced to her future husband, John Evelyn. Evelyn, an established member of the country gentry, had strong Royalist affiliations and visited Paris as part of his European Tour. In this time, he became a protegé of Richard Browne, and became well-acquainted with Mary. Initially, he had to compete for her affections with a fellow English traveller, but ultimately John won Mary's hand through his close relationship with Richard Browne and his ability to provide financial support for the Brownes. The pair were officially married in 1647, when Mary was 15, and John, twelve years her senior, was 27.

Later describing their courtship, Evelyn described "the pretynesse & innocence of her Youth…" but also highlighted her intellectual abilities and accounting skills that would make her a talented wife and homemaker. The couple's marriage was well received amongst contemporaries, with many prominent Royalists, including Duke and Duchess of Newcastle, extending their congratulations to the couple.

John and Mary spent a large part of their early marriage apart, while John travelled back and forth between England and France managing the Browne's financial affairs, while Mary continued her education in Paris. In this time, drawings of Mary, John, and her parents were composed by the French engraver Robert Nanteuil. Eventually, John purchased the lease for Sayes Court to relieve some of the family's financial burdens, and he began to purchase furnishing, silverware, and other improvements for the home in preparation for his wife. Mary served as a proxy-shopper on her husband's behalf, frequently writing to him to advise him on the latest styles in Paris to ensure that their home was suitably decorated for a family of their standing.

== Life in England ==
Mary, along with her mother, departed France in 1652 to join her husband in England. The couple's financial circumstances in this time were strained, living on approximately £400 annually. For these reasons, Mary initially struggled to adapt to life in England and was worried that her life would be consumed by housekeeping and domestic affairs. She reportedly sacrificed many of the luxuries she was accustomed to in Paris to maintain the household, forfeiting the promise of a pearl necklace to afford the practical luxury of a coach. This anxiety was compounded by her first pregnancy, and the sudden death of her mother in 1652. However it was said that she "brought a touch of France to Deptford", and though she evidently missed Paris, she quickly established a close circle of friends and a high level of independence.

On the Restoration of Charles II in 1660, the Evelyn's seemed well positioned to secure patronage from the new King, and John wrote to Mary in May of 1660, noting that "The Presence of the Ladies will be requisite at Court, and amongst them especially you…" Later, Mary attempted to secure a place in the household of the newly arrived Queen Catherine of Braganza in 1662 as lady of the Jewels, though ultimately this was unsuccessful and secured by Lady Scrope, who Evelyn believed bribed her way into the position. Regardless, Mary frequently interacted with the court, and on several occasions hosted the Queen and her ladies at Sayes Court.

As scholars of John Evelyn suggest, Mary's involvement at the Restoration Court and society has been a byproduct of her husband's ambitions, with one biographer noting that '"in public he liked to pretend that his wife was pursuing her worldly ambitions quite independently of him." However, Mary's Parisian upbringing made her amendable to life with the English elite, and she maintained a number of relationships with both male and female courtiers. It appears John was reluctant to have her at court, despite her wishes; he wrote to Mary in 1666 writing that he was "once or twice afraid of making you a Lady; but (I thank God) I got most dexterously off." She was also highly regarded among John's intellectual circle of friends and was widely considered to be his intellectual equal. She maintained several academic pursuits of her own: she was known for painting miniatures and distilling essences and plant oils from the couple's expansive garden. Mary also maintained her husband's garden during his time at court, and was trusted with his secret trunk, which only she could access.

== Family, friends, and relationships ==
John and Mary had six children in total, though only her youngest daughter Susannah would outlive her parents.

- Richard (1652–1658)
- John Standsfield (1653–1654)
- John (the younger) (1655–1699)
- George (1657–1658)
- Richard II (1664)
- Mary (1665–1685)
- Elizabeth (1667–1685)
- Susanna (1669–1754)

Mary had a close relationship with her daughters, whom she referred to as Mall, Betty, and Sue. Mary helped to prepare them for a potential life at court, frequently taking them to the spa town of Tunbridge to acquaint them with society, and spending the Winter of 1683 in London at the York buildings. In 1685, Mall died of smallpox and shortly thereafter Elizabeth eloped with a local dockworker. Estranged from her family, Elizabeth fell ill, and also died in 1685, seeking her parents' forgiveness before her death. While John was unable to forgive his middle daughter, Mary did, and was greatly affected by the death of two daughters in rapid succession. For the remainder of her life, Mary corresponded with her youngest daughter, Susanna, discussing London society, fashion, and more.

Generally Mary and her husband maintained a companionate and affectionate relationship. John described his wife as "the best wife in the world, sweet, and (though not charming) agreeable and as she grew up, pious, loyal & of so just a temper." Their greatest marital struggle stemmed from John's platonic friendship with the young Maid-of-Honour, Margaret Godolphin (née Blague). Mary expressed her discomfort with the close spiritual intimacy of her husband and Margaret, encouraging him to return from Court. However, she also treated Margaret with kindness, and grieved following her untimely death in childbirth.

In turn, Mary retained her own network of social relationships, namely through correspondence. Her skills as a letter-writer were praised, and she wrote particularly often with her children's tutor, Ralph Bohun, her cousin William Glanville, and Samuel and Mary Tuke, among others.

== Later years and death ==
Mary moved with her husband from Sayes Court to the Evelyn family estate at Wotton in 1694. The couple remained interested in the latest news from London through various newsletters and correspondence from family and friends. She died in 1709, three years after her husband and was buried alongside him at Wotton. She was survived by her daughter Susannah and grandson John Evelyn.
