= Richard Browne (died 1604) =

English politician

Sir Richard Browne (ca. 1539 – 1604), of Horsley, Essex and later of Sayes Court, Deptford, Kent, was an English politician.

He was a younger son of John Browne of Colchester, Essex and trained in the law at either the Inner or Middle Temple. He was knighted in 1603.

He was a Member (MP) of the Parliament of England for Lichfield in 1584, Newtown (Isle of Wight) in 1593, Cirencester in 1601 and Harwich in 1604.

He accompanied the Earl of Leicester on his expedition to the Netherlands in 1585 as victualler of his forces. He was appointed the Clerk of the Green Cloth in 1588, was a clerk comptroller of the Household by 1596 and Master of the Household and cofferer from 1603 until his death. He was a justice of the peace of the quorum for Middlesex by 1600. He was knighted on 24 July 1603.

He married Joan, the daughter of John Vigors (sometimes spelled Vigorus) of Langham, Essex, and had at least one son, Christopher. Joan was the young widow of Nicholas Eve of Chelmsford, Essex and had a young daughter Joan Eve (who married John Loveden of Buscot, Berkshire).

It appears that with Richard's appointment as Clerk of the Green Cloth, he was granted the lease from the Crown of the then 200 acre Saye's Court estate in Deptford (previously known as the manor of West Greenwich).

His son, Christopher Browne, walso lived at Saye's Court and married Thomasine Gonson, daughter of Benjamin Gonson, Treasurer of the Navy. His grandson, Richard, was created a baronet and great granddaughter, Mary Browne, was married to John Evelyn, the diarist.
