= Convoys Wharf =

Coordinates: 51.486°N 0.027°W

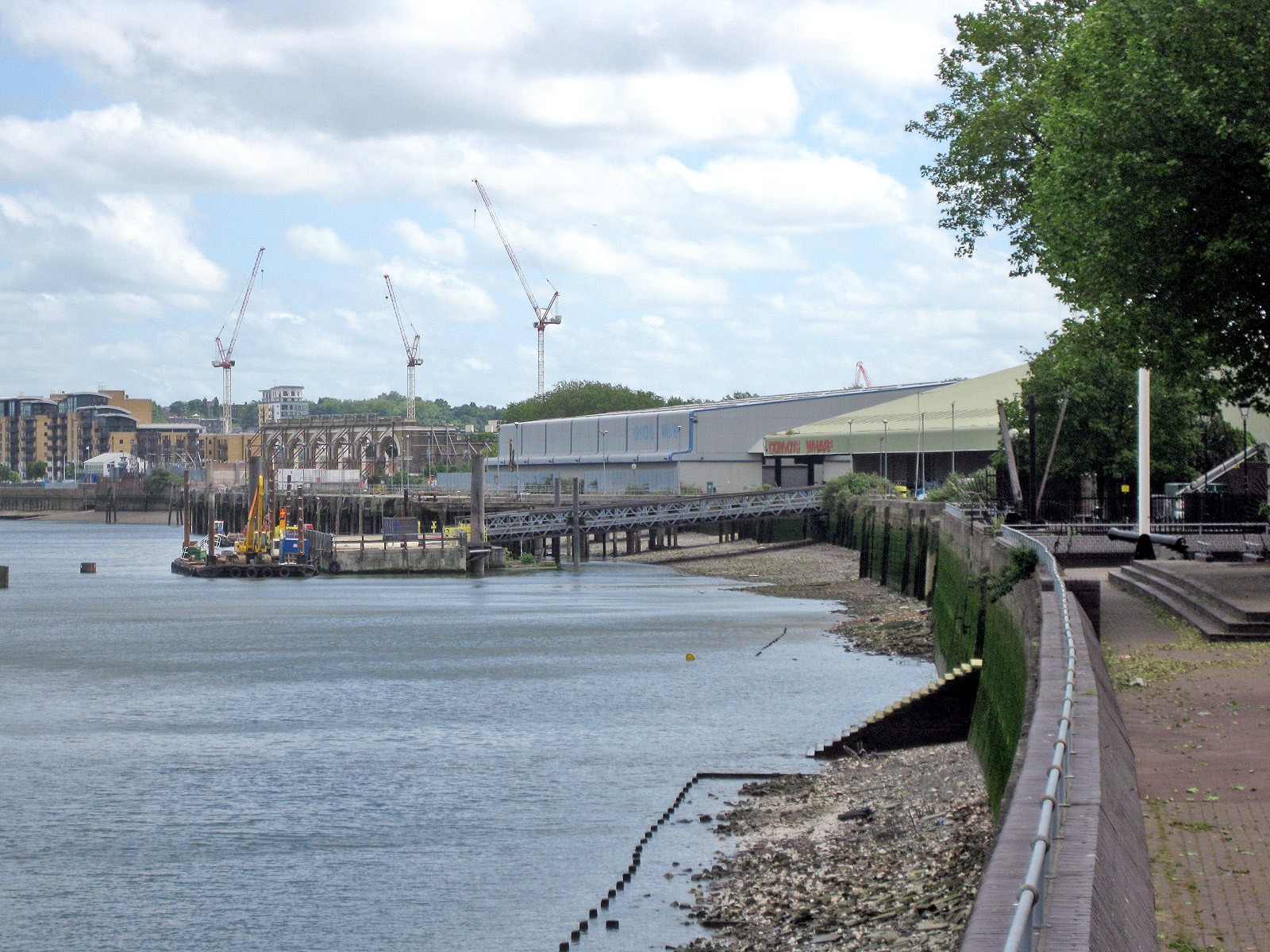
Convoys Wharf as seen from the Thames Path in 2009.

Convoys Wharf in Deptford is a former commercial wharf on the River Thames in London, currently awaiting redevelopment. It includes the site of Deptford Dockyard, built in the reign of King Henry VIII as one of the first Royal Dockyards. Convoys Wharf also covers most of the site of Sayes Court manor house and gardens, one-time home of the diarist John Evelyn.

The current name of the site dates from 1984, when the Ministry of Defence sold the wharf and adjoining land to Convoys Ltd (newsprint importers). Convoys Wharf was subsequently taken over by News International, which used it to import newsprint and other paper products from Finland until early 2000. Having been sold by News International in 2008, it is now owned by Hutchison Whampoa Limited and is subject to a planning application to convert it into residential units, although a large part of the site has safeguarded wharf status.

The area to the south-east, adjoining Watergate Street, was Palmers Wharf; while to the north-west is the Pepys Estate, a 1960s housing estate built on the site of the Royal Victoria Victualling Yard.

== History ==
=== Sayes Court ===
After the Norman Conquest the manor of Deptford was bestowed upon one Gilbert de Magminot, a descendent of whom married Geoffrey de Saye (who gave his name to the manor house on the estate). After the Restoration, the lease on the estate was acquired by the diarist John Evelyn.

=== Royal Dockyard ===
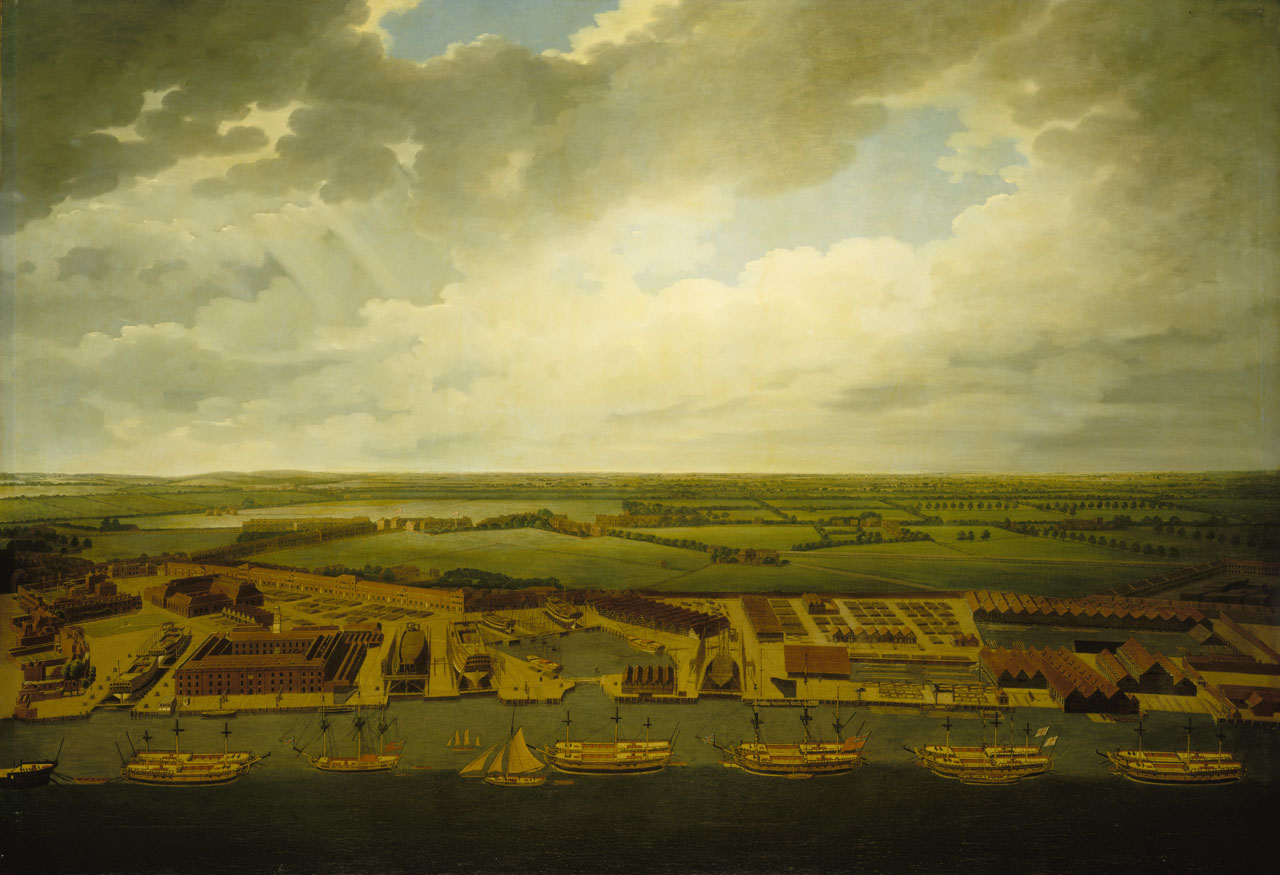
Landscape view of Deptford Dockyard; Oil on canvas by Joseph Farington (late 18th century to early 19th century); from Collections of the National Maritime Museum.

The Dockyard, formerly known as the King's Yard, was established in 1513 by King Henry VIII for the building, repair and maintenance of vessels for the Royal Navy. Along with nearby Woolwich Dockyard, it was one of the leading dockyards of the period and brought a large population and prosperity to Deptford.

The dockyard is also associated with the knighting of Sir Francis Drake by Queen Elizabeth I aboard the Golden Hind, the legend of Sir Walter Raleigh laying down his cape for Elizabeth, Captain James Cook's third voyage aboard Resolution, Frobisher's and Vancouver's voyages of discovery, despatching ships against the Spanish Armada, as well as for Nelson's battles including Trafalgar.

In 1698 Tsar Peter I of Russia aged 25, came to Deptford to learn about shipbuilding and seamanship. He was granted the use of John Evelyn's Sayes Court, adjoining the Royal Dockyard, by William III. In three months he and his party caused considerable damage to the famous gardens, and also to the house, with "much of the furniture broke, lost or destroyed". Sir Christopher Wren was instructed to survey the property and declared it "entirely ruined". At the mouth of Deptford Creek, on the Fairview Housing estate, there is a statue, designed by Mihail Chemiakin and gifted by Russia commemorating Peter's visit.

By the 18th century, due to the silting of the Thames, the dockyard's use was restricted to ship building and distributing stores to other yards and fleets abroad. It was largely shut down from 1830 to 1844; shipbuilding then resumed on the site, but in 1864 a Parliamentary Committee recommended that the Royal Dockyards at Deptford and Woolwich should be closed. Their recommendation was accepted and the Deptford dockyard was closed in May 1869, by which time it employed 800 people. It had produced some 450 ships, the last being the wooden screw corvette HMS Druid launched in 1869.

=== Foreign Cattle Market ===
Before refrigeration cattle had to be imported alive, and the Contagious Diseases (Animals) Act 1869 gave the City of London Corporation exclusive local authority for foreign animal imports and processing subject to its opening a market before January 1872.

The complete site at Deptford, including a lease on the LB&SCR docks, was acquired and the market opened in 1871. By 1889 the site had been extended to 27 acres (11 ha). In 1907, 184,971 cattle and 49,350 sheep were imported through the market but by 1912 these figures had declined to 21,547 cattle and 11,993 sheep.

=== During the War years ===
The Foreign Cattle Market was taken over by the War Department in 1914, on a tenancy agreement from the City of London Corporation, for use as the Royal Army Service Corps Supply Reserve Depot. The War Department hired the Sayes Court area and almshouses, from the City of London Corporation from 19 September 1914 to use as a Horse Transport Reserve Depot at a rental of £90 per annum (equivalent to £9,000 in 2025), to enlarge its Supply Reserve Depot at the Foreign Cattle Market.

On several occasions after the Armistice traders and others urged that the market should be reopened; however, in 1924 the War Office exercised their option to buy it. The fee simple of the Foreign Cattle Market and of the Sayes Court property were purchased by the War Department, for £400,500 (equivalent to £21,170,000 in 2025), under deeds dated 25 March 1926, 18 March 1927 and 25 July 1927 including the railway, tramway, wharfage and jetty rights and easements.

The yard also served as a United States' Advance Amphibious Vehicle base and married quarters during the Second World War. During the Second World War a bomb destroyed one of the storehouses in the adjacent Royal Naval Victualling Depot and killed a number of men; a plaque was visible in the early 1970s commemorating this tragedy. During the war, because of the Blitz some of the stores were dispersed to various locations including Park Royal.

=== Railways ===
From 15 December 1900 there was tramway access via Grove Street, to the Foreign Cattle Market, using their own Maudslay petrol locomotive. When the docks became an army depot the junction was relaid to standard gauge for direct connection to the LB&SCR. There was as well, an internal narrow-gauge tramway system. When the War Department took over, they introduced steam locomotives to work the tramways, purchasing between 1915 and 1917, twelve oil-fired Warril type 18 in (457 mm) gauge locomotives from the Hunslet Engine Company. In December 1920 the Government announced the sale of the equipment from the railway at the Deptford Meat Depot. In 1921 Sir Robert Walker purchased three locos and 75 wagons for the Sand Hutton Light Railway, and purchased a fourth 1927. By January 1938 of the remaining eight locos, seven were apparently still in existence at Deptford, but out of use.

=== Latter part of 20th century ===
On the closure of the Victualling Depot in the 1960s the establishment was renamed The Royal Naval Stores Depot and moved to a new building within what is now Convoys Wharf. The Depot was the main Air Freight hub for the RN and was particularly busy during the Falklands War. It also continued as the central RN Stationery Store and Joint Services Baggage operations. The Depot closed in 1981.

The site was purchased by News International from the UK Ministry of Defence for £1,600,000 (equivalent to £6,870,000 in 2025), and a remainder in 1986, for £340,000 (equivalent to £1,020,000 in 2025). In 1993 the Greenwich and Lewisham (London Borough Boundaries) Order transferred the site from the London Borough of Greenwich to the London Borough of Lewisham.

=== Archaeology ===
Most of the Tudor, Stuart, Georgian and Victorian structures above ground level that had survived until 1955 have since been destroyed. One structure that escaped the demolition is Olympia Warehouse, a unique cast-iron building constructed in the 1840s. However, archaeological surveys carried out by CgMs and Pre-Construct Archaeology in 2000 by Duncan Hawkins, in 2000 by Jon Lowe and in 2001 by David Divers, established that by far the greater part of the dockyard survives as buried structures filled in intact between 1869 and 1950. The structures of the yard proper, the docks, slips, basins, mast ponds, landing places and stairs, constitute a substantial architectural fabric that is currently extant, though largely invisible, being covered by superficial accretion or infill. As yet there has been no archaeological investigation of the garden area of Sayes Court, and only limited trial trenching of part of the manor house.

=== International recognition ===
In October 2013 Deptford Dockyard and Sayes Court garden were added to the World Monuments Fund's 2014 watch list.

== Redevelopment ==
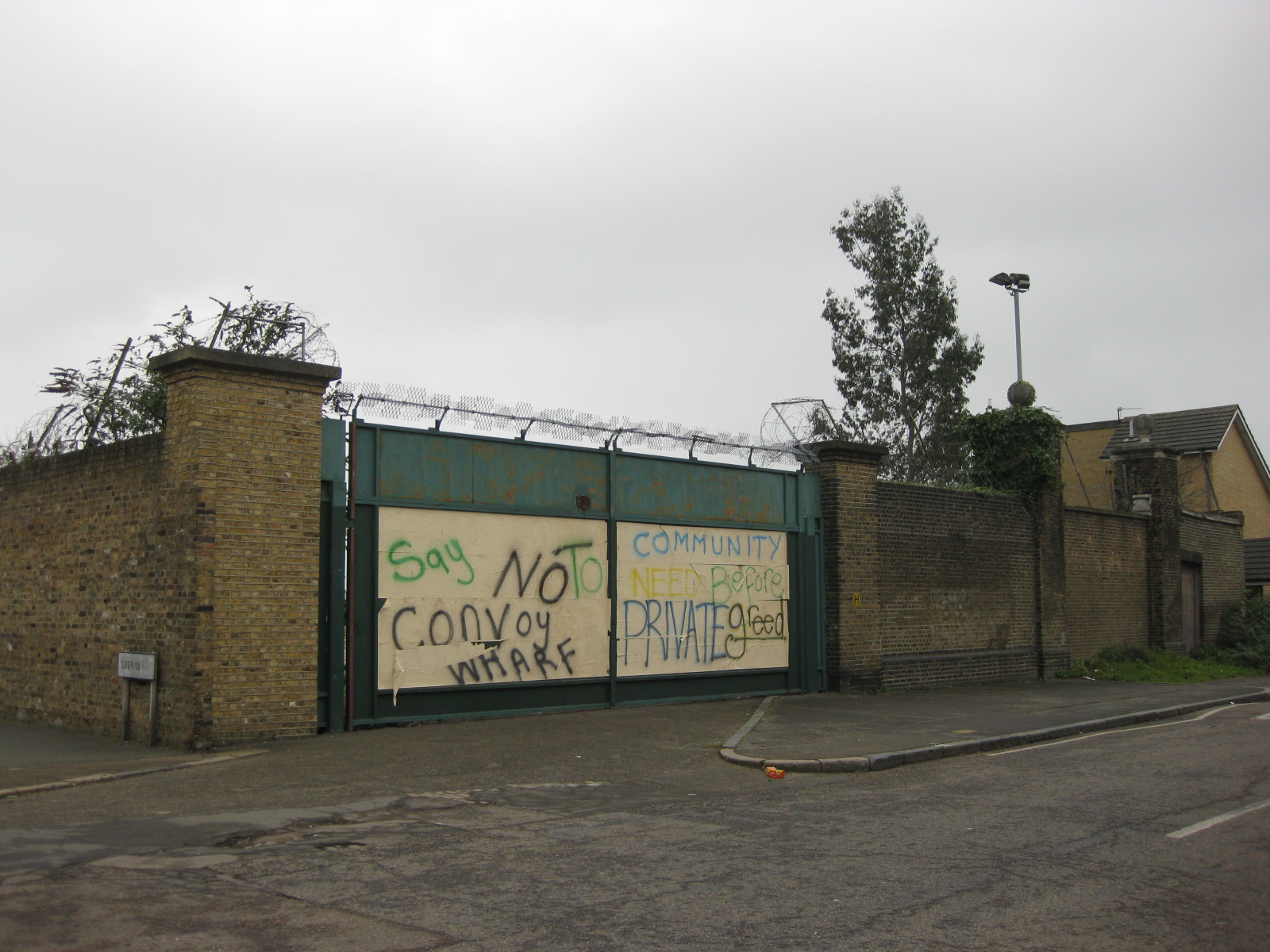
Protest graffiti on the Grove Street gateway

In October 2000, 'Creekside Forum' set up the 'Convoys Opportunity' umbrella group in response to the News International Ltd plan to sell the 40-acre (160,000 m^{2}) Convoys Wharf site. Convoys Opportunity, composed of community organisations, churches, businesses and others in Deptford and beyond, campaigned to have the News International scheme refused and the safeguarding order upheld.

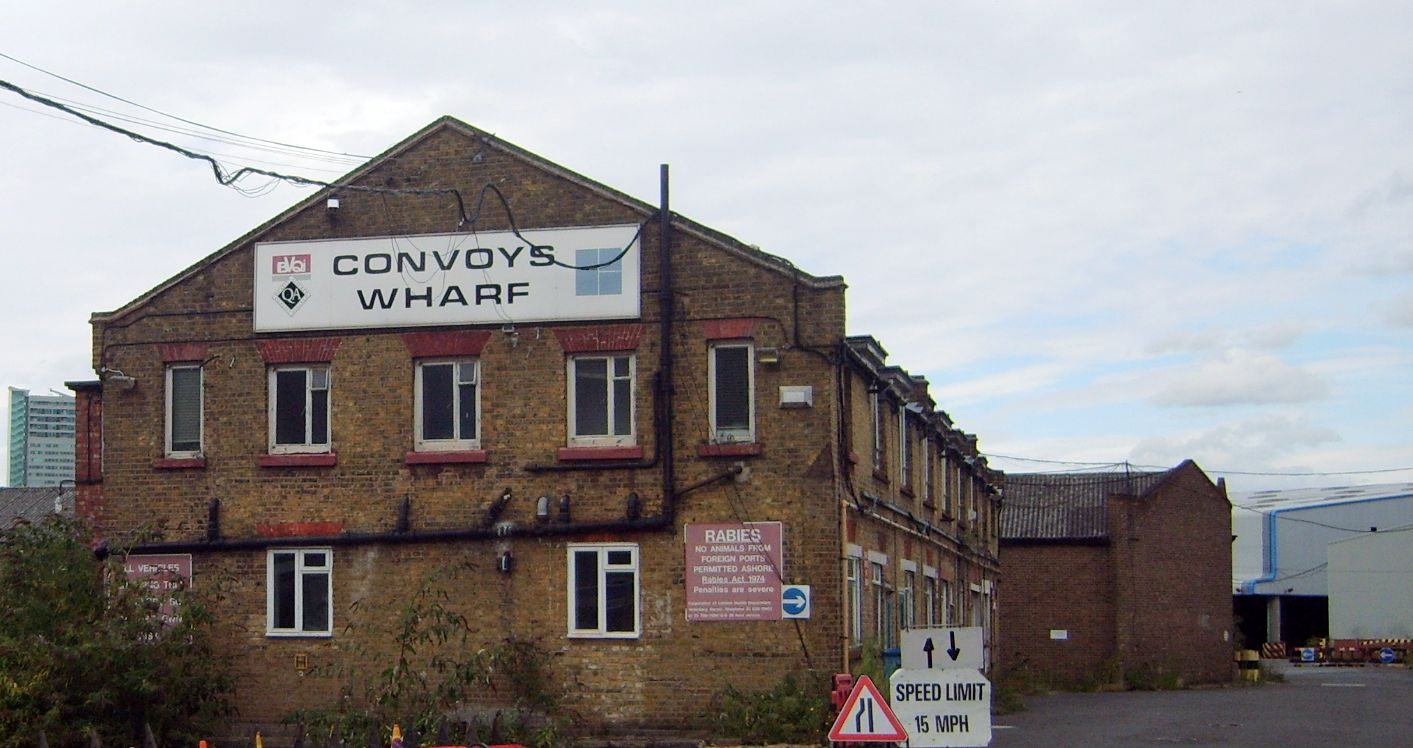
Convoys Wharf

In 2002 News International applied to the London Borough of Lewisham for outline planning permission to erect 3,500 residential units on the site. Lewisham councillors resolved to approve the application in May 2005. The Grade II listed Olympia Warehouse would have to be preserved and refurbished as part of the redevelopment of the site. News International engaged Richard Rogers to develop a masterplan for the site.

On 18 May 2005 a 50/50 joint venture company of Cheung Kong Holdings and Hutchison Whampoa entered into an agreement to acquire Convoys Wharf, to develop it as a mixed residential and commercial project, with News International retaining a profit share in the sale of the luxury homes proposed. In 2008 a new planning application was submitted by Hutchison based largely on the original Richard Rogers scheme.

In July 2011 Hutchison Whampoa engaged Aedas to develop a new masterplan for the site and submitted an amendment planning application. Then in early 2012 Hutchison appointed Terry Farrell to revise the masterplan for the site and submitted a planning application in April 2013.

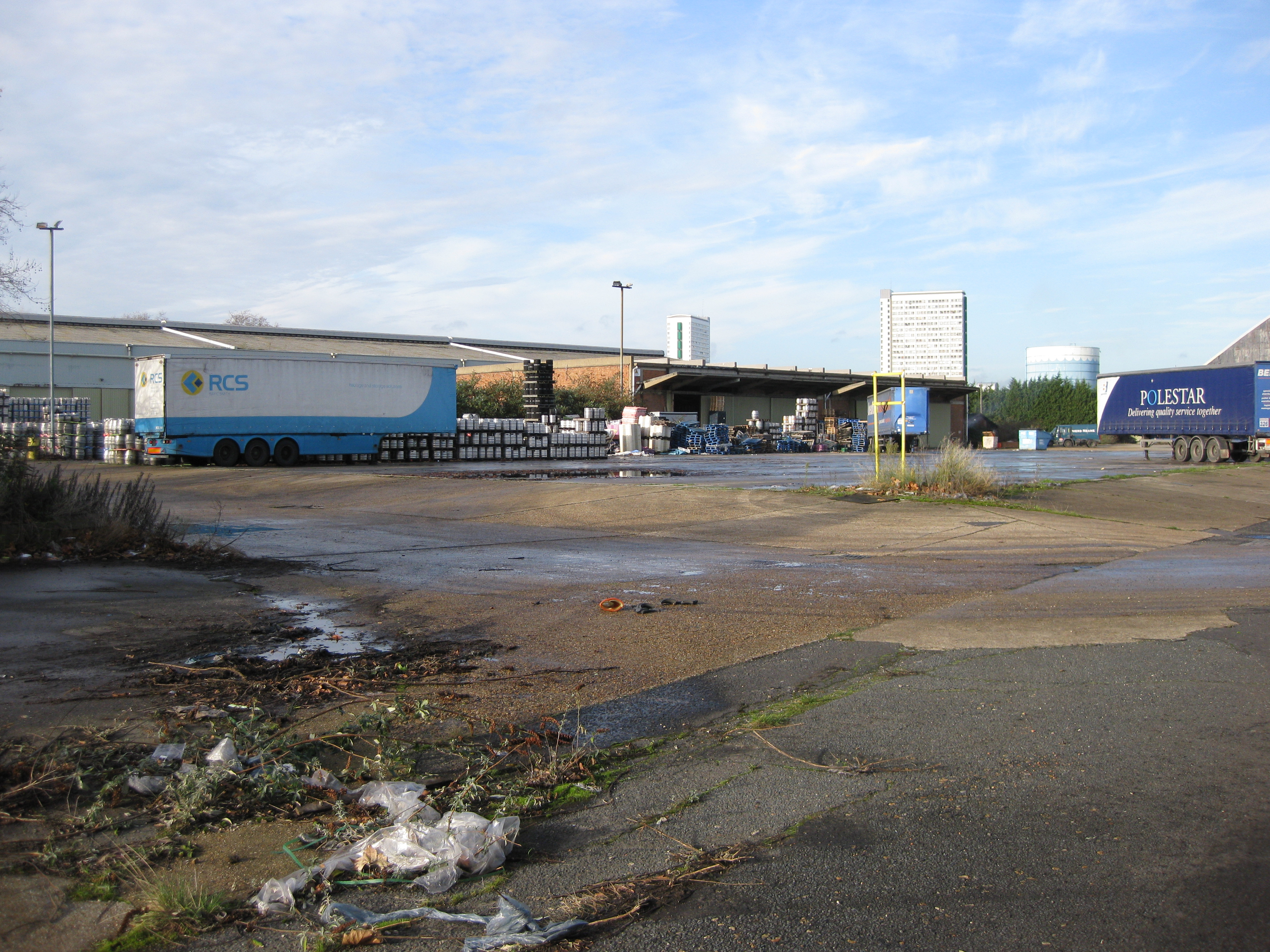
The location of Sayes Court almshouses in 2009

In September 2011 a group of local residents launched a campaign, with the name Deptford Is... to oppose the masterplan proposed by the developers. They proposed two projects to connect to the history of the area and benefit the local community: the Lenox project (see below) and Sayes Court Garden.

On 17 October 2013, Boris Johnson, the Mayor of London called in the application. In January 2014 Lewisham Council's strategic planning committee recommended that the outline planning application for Convoys Wharf in its current form be rejected.

On 22 January 2014, Dame Joan Ruddock challenged the government to recognise the unique heritage features of the site.

On 31 March 2014, Boris Johnson approved plans to build up to 3,500 new homes on the Convoys Wharf site that has been derelict since 2000.

A planning application to build a first major residential block of 456 flats, the first of 22 plots in Hutchison's masterplan, was approved by Lewisham Council in June 2020. Future plans include a 1.5-acre park on an existing river pontoon, cultural, commercial and retail space, and 3,500 homes including three towers up to 40 storeys tall. A detailed planning application for plot P01, at the eastern end of the river frontage, was submitted in April 2023; it related to a 12-storey development containing 247 new homes, with ground floor retail/leisure floorspace and residential amenity space.

=== The Lenox Project ===
In 2013 the Lenox Project put forward a formal proposal to build a full-size sailing replica of HMS Lenox, a 70-gun ship of the line originally built at Deptford Dockyard in 1678. The ship would actually be constructed on the dockyard site, and would form the centrepiece of a purpose-built museum which would remain as a permanent part of the development of Convoys Wharf.

By late 2015 the project had gathered momentum, with more detailed plans fitting the building of the Lenox into the overall development of this part of Deptford. The 2015 Feasibility Study identified the Safeguarded Wharf at the Western end of the Convoys Wharf site as the most suitable place for the dry-dock where the ship herself would be built; the existing but disused canal entrance could then be modified to provide an entrance for the dock as well as a home berth for the finished ship.

It is hoped that the Lenox will provide a focus for the regeneration of the area as the comparable replica ship Hermione did for Rochefort in France.

== See also ==
- Deptford Dockyard
