= John Evelyn's cabinet =

John Evelyn's Cabinet
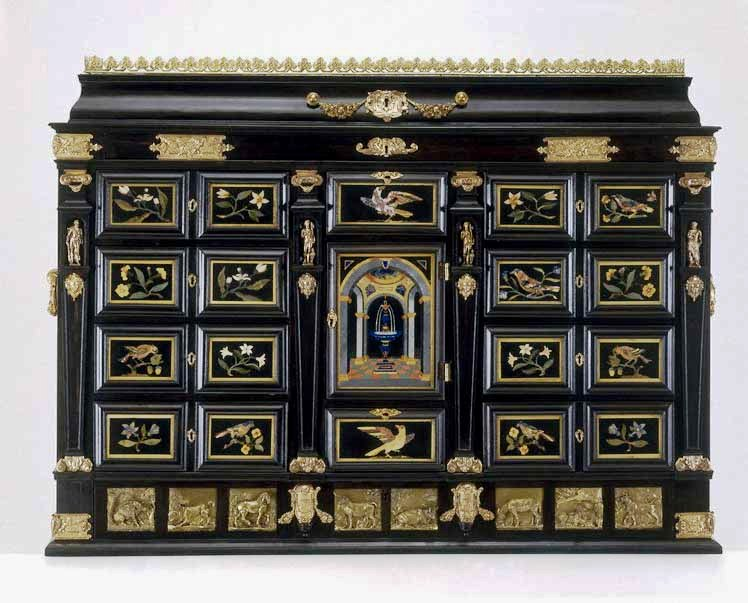
- V&A Museum no. W.24-1977
- Designer: Domenico Benotti (marble panels); Francesco Fanelli (bronze panels)
- Date: 1644–1646 expanded c. 1652
- Made in: Florence, Italy; Expanded (probably) in Paris
- Materials: Oak veneered with ebony, inlaid marble panels, gilt bronze & brass panels
- Collection: Victoria & Albert Museum, London

John Evelyn's cabinet is a kabinettschrank (a highly decorated storage box) in the collection of the Victoria & Albert Museum in London. The cabinet was probably made in Florence for the diarist John Evelyn (1620–1706), and is an early example of a piece of furniture commissioned by a British visitor making the 'Grand Tour' of Europe.

== Specialty ==
Objects often acquire their fame because of who owned them, but what makes this cabinet unusual is that its physical appearance was the result of elements already owned by the man who commissioned it. The cabinet was expressly made to incorporate 19 pietre dure (hardstone) panels, which Evelyn purchased in Florence from their maker, Domenico Benotti (active 1630–1650), in 1644. The base of the cabinet was later heightened (probably in Paris) to accommodate the addition of a series of bronze plaques, probably made in Florence by Francesco Fanelli (active 1610–1642).

== Recognition ==
Evelyn's Diary was first published in the early 1800s, more than a century after his death. The national recognition he achieved in turn gave the cabinet new significance, and it was further embellished with gilt brass mounts, decorated with amorini and swags, the strawberry leaf cresting, and provided with its stand.

On Evelyn's return from the Grand Tour, the cabinet was probably housed in Dover Street, London. Soon after Evelyn's death in 1706 it was moved to his country residence, Wotton House in Wotton, Surrey. In 1813, John Evelyn's diaries were discovered in an 'ebony cabinet' at Wotton House, quite possibly this one.
