= Evelyn tables =

17th century anatomical preparations

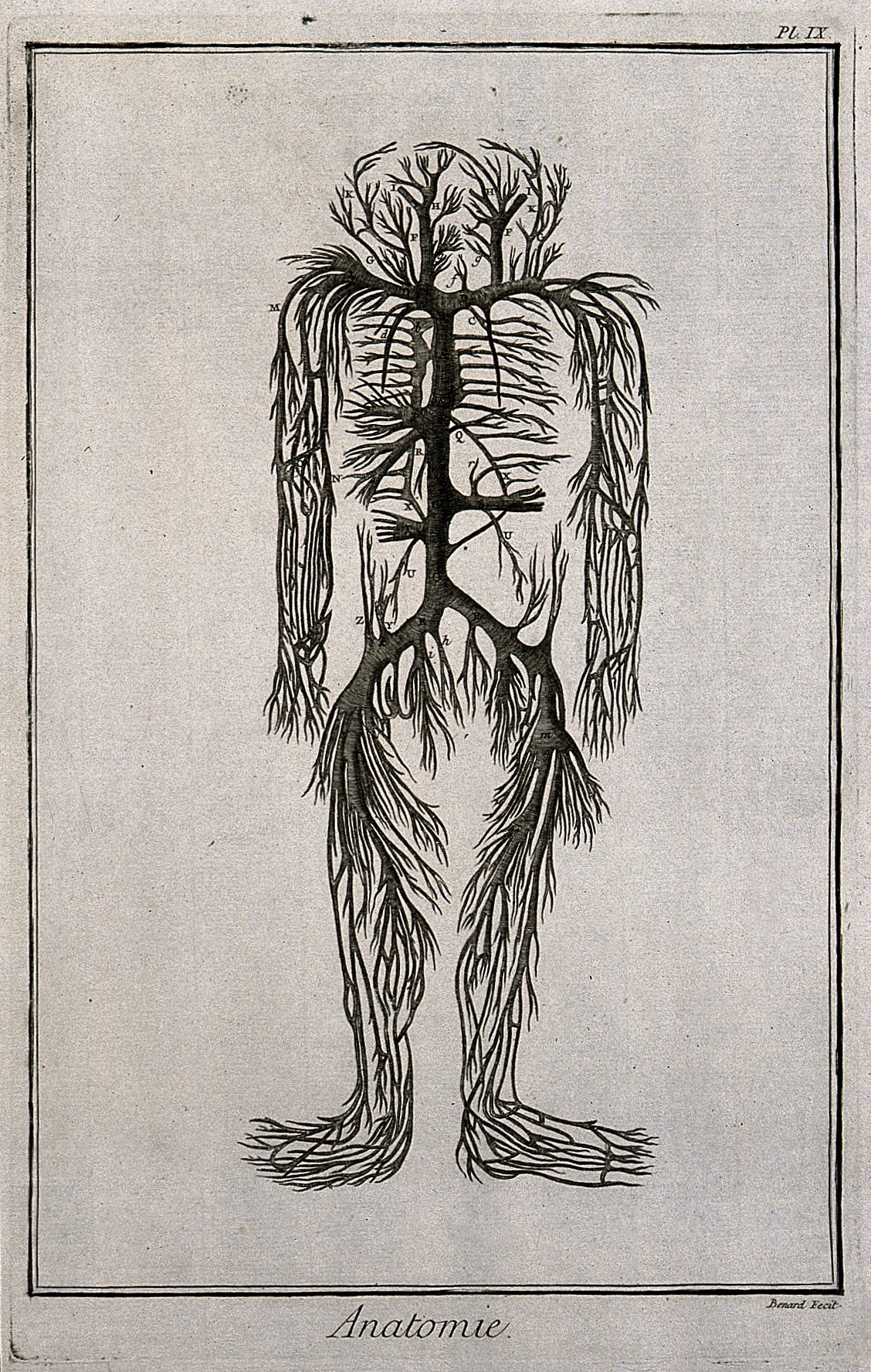
Eighteenth-century engraving of the veins on the fourth Evelyn table

The Evelyn tables are a set of four anatomical preparations on wooden boards that are thought to be the oldest anatomical preparations in Europe. They were acquired by John Evelyn in Padua in 1646 and later donated by Evelyn to the Royal Society. They are currently owned by the Royal College of Surgeons, and displayed there at the Hunterian Museum in London. Six similar tables are held by the Royal College of Physicians, brought to London from Italy by John Finch.

Each table displays a different part of the human body – arteries, nerves, veins – dissected out from a human specimen and glued to a wooden board made from pine planks, planed and glued together, with the whole covered with several coats of varnish. Each table is approximately 1.9 m (6 ft 3 in) high, 77 cm (30 in) wide, and 10 cm (4 in) thick. The first table displays the spinal cord and nerves; the second shows the aorta and the arteries; the third shows the vagi and sympathetic nerves, and the veins of the lungs and the liver; and the fourth shows the distribution of the veins.

== History ==
Evelyn spent several years outside England in the 1640s, during the English Civil War. His diary records a visit to Padua in March 1646 to view dissection lectures at the University of Padua, when he acquired the four tables (a later letter reports the price as 150 scudi). Three of the tables (arteries, nerves, veins) were prepared by Giovanni Leoni d'Este (died 1649), dissector to Professor of Anatomy in Padua, Johann Vesling (1598-1649), for Leoni's own use. The fourth (vagi, lungs, liver) was prepared by Leoni at Evelyn's request. Evelyn travelled on, eventually returning to London. His diary also records the arrival of the tables in London in April 1649 (the journey via Venice having been delayed in Holland) and his donation of the tables to the nascent Royal Society in October 1667, which displayed them in the "repository" (museum) in the west gallery of Gresham College on Bishopsgate from 1674. A paper on the tables of arteries and veins was presented by William Cowper on 21 January 1701 and later printed in Philosophical Transactions, with his drawings engraved by Michael van der Gucht.

After a move to a new location in Crane Court, off Fleet Street, the tables were acquired by the rapidly expanding British Museum in June 1781, and then bought by the Royal College of Surgeons in 1809.

== In popular culture ==
A fictional 'fifth Evelyn table' showing the lymphatic system features in Guillermo del Toro's 2025 film adaptation of Mary Shelley's novel Frankenstein (1818).
