= Mary Evelyn (poet) =

English poet (1665–1685)

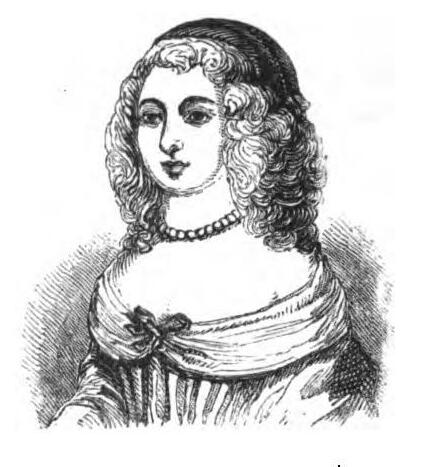
Mary Evelyn

Mary Evelyn (1 October 1665 – 14 March 1685) was an English poet. She wrote a long burlesque poem.

Born on 1 October 1665 in Surrey, England, Mary Evelyn was the eldest daughter of John Evelyn (1620 –1706), royal diarist, and his wife Mary Browne (1632–1709), English letter writer.

Evelyn spent her childhood at her family home, Sayes Court, in Deptford, Kent. She was self-educated and known for extensively reading the sacred and secular writings. She also read miscellaneous literary collections, annotations and meditations that she herself produced. The satirical poem, Mundus Muliebris: Or The Ladies Dressing-Room Unlock'd, and Her Toilets Spread, is one of her known works published posthumously by her father in 1690.

She died on 14 March 1685 in Wiltshire, England of smallpox.
