= Sir Richard Browne, 1st Baronet, of Deptford =

English ambassador

Sir Richard Browne, 1st Baronet of Deptford (c. 1605 – 12 February 1682/83) was English ambassador to the court of France at Paris from 1641 to 1660.

== Life ==
Browne was the son of Christopher Browne and Thomazine Gonson. His grandfather was Sir Richard Browne, Kt. Clerk of the Green Cloth from 1594 until his death in 1604.

A tablet in the church at Deptford mentions that the family was a younger branch of the ancient Browne family of Hitchin, Suffolk and Horsley, Essex.

Browne played the part of Diana in Robert White's 'Masque of Cupid's Banishment' performed for Anne of Denmark at Deptford on 4 May 1617.

He matriculated at Christ Church, Oxford, on 26 June 1623, aged eighteen, and gained the degree of BA as a member of St Alban Hall the same year. He became a fellow of Merton in 1624, and proceeded to MA on 28 July 1628, having become a student of Gray's Inn in 1627 and esquire of the bedchamber to King Charles I.

Browne was sworn clerk-in-ordinary of the privy council on 27 January 1641. He was the resident English ambassador to the court of France at Paris from 1641 to 1660. He was at this post when the young John Evelyn met him in the autumn of 1646. By June 1647, Evelyn had secured permission to marry Richard's 12-year-old daughter Mary Browne.

He was created a Baronet by Charles II in 1649. Being a Royalist he could not easily return to England to his family estate Sayes Court, in Deptford, opposite the Naval Dockyard. John Evelyn eventually purchased the Sayes Court estate in 1653.

Browne died at Charlton, Kent.

== Notes ==
Baronetage of England
New creation	Baronet (of Deptford); 1649–1683	Extinct
