= Council of Lillebonne =

Meeting of the nobles and clergy of Normandy

The Council of Lillebonne was a meeting of the nobles and clergy of Normandy where, among other things, the expedition of William the Conqueror, then Duke of Normandy, was approved. It was held at Lillebonne, in the northeast of Normandy. Wace, the 12th-century historian, wrote of the council, convened shortly before the actual invasion, likely in January 1066. William of Poitiers, a chronicler of the Norman invasion, claims that the duke also obtained the consent of Pope Alexander II for the invasion, along with a papal banner.

The council, also called the Norman Council and Assembly of Lillebonne, began with the refusal of Harold to relinquish the crown of England. Two such councils were held, a smaller council of trusted advisors and a larger council to discuss the planned conquest. Relatives and allies of William participated including many of the proven Companions of William:

- Robert, Count of Mortain, half-brother of William
- William FitzOsbern, 1st Earl of Hereford, cousin of William and a proven companion, a strong advocate of the invasion who convinced the doubters that the mission was feasible
- Odo, Bishop of Bayeux, William’s half-brother
- Odo, Count of Champagne, William’s brother-in-law
- Richard, Count of Évreux, father of William, Count of Évreux, a proven companion
- Hugh of Eu, Bishop of Lisieux, brother of the traitor Busac
- Roger de Beaumont, who murdered William’s tormentor Roger I of Tosny, who advised William but did not participate in the invasion due to his advanced years
- Raoul IV de Conches, grandson of Roger of Tosny
- Hugh de Grandmesnil, a proven companion of William’s, originally banished but reinstated
- Roger de Montgomerie, 1st Earl of Shrewsbury, who had previously cursed William
- Walter Giffard, Lord of Longueville, a known companion of William’s
- Hugh de Montfort, Lord of Montfort-sur-Risle, a known companion of William’s
- William de Warenne, 1st Earl of Surrey.

Cajoled by William FitzOsbern, the council approved the invasion plans. William of Poitiers nevertheless describes the council and gives an account of a debate that took place between among the nobles and supporters over whether to risk an invasion of England. Although some formal meeting probably was held, it is unlikely that there was significant debate, as the duke had by then established control over his nobles, and those assembled would want to secure their share of the rewards from the conquest of England.

== Sources ==
- Douglas, David C. (May 1964). William the Conqueror: The Norman Impact Upon England.
- Freeman, Edward Augustus (2011). "The Norman Council and the Assembly of Lillebonne". The History of the Norman Conquest of England. London: Cambridge University Press.
