= Hugh of Eu =

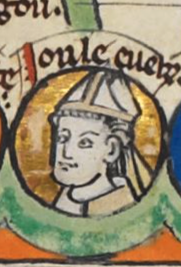
Hugh of Eu

Hugh of Eu (Hugues, Hugo) (fl. 1049 - d. 17 July 1077) was Bishop of Lisieux from 1049 to 1077.

== History ==
Hugh was the son of William I, Count of Eu, and his wife Lesceline. One of his brothers, Robert, would become Lord of Hastings following the Conquest of England, and his other brother, William Busac, would later become the Count of Eu and then Count of Soissons through marriage. William I of Eu's father was Richard I of Normandy, making Hugh the second cousin of William the Conqueror.

William of Poitiers and Orderic Vitalis both depict him with a flattering light. He became bishop of Lisieux at a very young age in 1049; despite his youth, William of Poitiers insisted that he 'showed himself more spiritually mature than the greybeards', that is, than the other bishops of Normandy. Under his episcopacy he completed the reconstruction of the cathedral, originally begun by his predecessor, Herbert of Lisieux, and proceeded his dedication according to the Neustria Pia on 8 July 1060. He was responsible for bringing the relics of Arcadius of Bourges to Saint Ursin's. He organized the cathedral chapter, composed of a dean, a treasurer and a cantor, and brought to the diocese a number of distinguished priests, many educated there at Hugh's instruction.

In 1050, Hugh, together with his brother and mother, founded the abbey of Saint-Désir de Lisieux, composed of nuns from Saint-Pierre-sur-Dives and later Benedictine monks. On October 7, 1050, he blessed Thierry de Mathonville, the first abbot of the abbey of Saint-Évroult since its restoration and later both Osberne in 1061 and Mainier d'Échauffour, in 1066. In 1053, Hugh led the Council of Lisieux, which championed reformist policies such as the condemnation of simony and nicolaism by Norman prelates, and led to the deposition of Mauger from his position as archbishop of Rouen. Hugh is not seen as a reformer, despite his leadership of this council; instead he is seen as a member of what David Douglas refers to as 'a group of prelates…out of touch with the reforming ideals', due to their aristocratic descent and familial affiliations, often at the expense of reformist policy.

These familial affiliations culminated in controversy, when Hugh's involvement in the removal of Robert of Saint-Evroul as abbot, and his replacement with Osberne of Cormeilles, done without the consent of the monks at Saint-Evroul led to some discontent at the abbey. Robert had been accused of slandering William the Conqueror, although this was probably due to a dispute between the Duke and Robert's brother, Hugh de Grandmesnil; Orderic suggests that this was done through the machinations of Mabel of Bellême, due to her own territorial disputes with the de Grandmesnil family. Marjorie Chibnall, however, suggests that it may instead be due to the rebellion of Robert Giroie, to whom the de Grandmesnils owed allegiance. This dispute led to abbot Robert fleeing Saint-Evroul, and seeking the protection of Pope Nicholas II. When Robert vacated the monastery, he was replaced by Osberne at the advice of Rainer of La Trinité-du-Mont; this led to many of the monks at Saint-Evroul joining Robert in Norman Sicily.

He attended the Council of Lillebonne, where the expedition of William the Conqueror to England was approved. He was present at the dedication of Jumièges Abbey on July 1, 1067, as well as to the dedications of the cathedrals of Bayeux and Évreux and that of the Abbey of Saint-Étienne, Caen in 1077.

Hugh fell ill at Pont-l'Évêque and died on his return trip on July 17, 1077. He was buried at the Saint-Désir Abbey after a period of intense debate between the nuns of Saint-Désir and the canons of the Cathedral of Saint-Pierre, in Lisieux. This debate was taken to the court of King William, who eventually commanded that the Archbishop John of Rouen bury him at the church of Saint-Marie; when John refused to obey the king's command, Gilbert, bishop of Évreux, instead interred the body at the abbey of Saint-Désir. This was despite Hugh's own request, made en route from Pont-l'Évêque, to be buried in the cathedral at Lisieux. His burial was attended by 'a great multitude of the faithful', and his brother, Robert, was also in attendance. His tomb was discovered by François Cottin in the 1950s in the center of the sanctuary of the first abbey church.

He was succeeded by Gilbert Maminot, who had been the chaplain and physician of King William.

== See also ==
- Catholic Church in France
- Ancient Diocese of Lisieux
- Counts of Eu

== Sources ==
- Pierre Bouet, Pierre, and Neveux, François, Les évêques normands du XIe siècle : Colloque de Cerisy-la-Salle, Presses Universitaires de Caen, Caen, 1995
- Bois, Louis, Histoire de Lisieux (ville, diocèse et arrondissement) tome 1, Chez Durand, Lisieux, 1846
- Douglas, David, The Earliest Norman Counts, The English Historical Review, vol. 61, no 240, 1946
- Douglas, David, William the Conqueror: the Norman impact upon England, Eyre Methuen, London, 1977.
- Orderic Vitalis, The Ecclesiastical History, trans. Marjorie Chibnall, Clarendon Press, Oxford, 1969.
- Waters, E. Chester, The Counts of Eu, Sometime Lords of the Honour of Tickhill, The Yorkshire Archaeological and Topographical Journal, No. 9, 1886, pp. 266–267.
- Wace, Roman de Rou, trans. & ed. Glyn S. Burgess and Elisabeth van Houts, Boydell Press, Rochester, 2004.
- William of Poitiers, Gesta Guillelmi, trans. & ed. R. H. C. Davis and Marjorie Chibnall, Clarendon Press, Oxford, 1998.
