= Gilbert de Magminot =

Norman bishop

Gilbert Maminot, or Magminot, (d. August, 1101), was a Norman bishop in the eleventh century. He was born of 'a substantial Norman family of the middle rank', in Courbépine, his father being the knight Robert of Courbépine. He was known to his contemporaries as a capable administrator, and, according to Marjorie Chibnall, he was more than a match for Robert Curthose, who had succeeded his father, William the Conqueror, to the title of Duke of Normandy. Prior to his ascension to the see of Lisieux, Maminot had been the personal physician and chaplain to William the Conqueror.

== Bishop of Lisieux ==
Upon the death of Hugh of Eu in 1077, Gilbert was elected as his successor and was anointed by Michael, the bishop of Avranches in the presence of John, the Archbishop of Rouen. Maminot was known to be 'a man of great learning and some medical skill, just and firm…but merciful’ and a capable administrator, although he was more notorious, according to Marjorie Chibnall, for his failings; ‘worldliness, obstinacy, and self-indulgence’. Orderic Vitalis wrote that while Maminot was a man of ‘great learning and eloquence…[he] was a slave to his own desires…[and] a great lover of leisure…’ While he was bishop, Maminot encouraged the expansion of an intellectual circle at Lisieux that had been first encouraged by his predecessor. In the Historia Ecclesiastica, Orderic Vitalis wrote that Maminot was ‘very skilled in many subjects, and had long made a habit of watching the stars each night…[he was] a learned astronomer.' Orderic goes on to explain that, on the 4th of April, in 1095, there was ‘a great shower of stars thick enough to have passed for hail’, that Gilbert observed, and that the bishop noted that:

“In my opinion this means the migration of peoples from one kingdom to another. For many will set out and never return until the stars return to their own orbits, from which now, as we see plainly, they are failing. Others indeed will remain in the high, holy place, like stars shining in the firmament."

Orderic suggests that this prophecy was related to the First Crusade, which Pope Urban II would proclaim later that same year.

As bishop of Lisieux, and having been the king's former personal physician, Maminot was present at the death of William the Conqueror in 1087, at the priory of Saint-Gervaise, and gave the funerary sermon at the monastery of Saint Stephen where the Conqueror was interred.

On the 15th of March, 1091 he ordained Orderic Vitalis as a subdeacon of the cathedral of Lisieux. In 1096 Gilbert was recorded as an attendee at the Synod of Rouen, where the decrees of the Council of Claremont were proclaimed; this council was also responsible for reiterating the enforcement of the Peace of God, amongst other decrees. In 1099, Maminot is known to have visited the abbey of Saint-Évroul, where he aided in a ceremony to dedicate the abbey's new church building, consecrating the high altar. This ceremony could only take place after the intervention of William II, as Gilbert had refused to bless either abbot-elect Serlo or abbot-elect Roger of Le Sap as Norman custom demanded; instead, Maminot had insisted on receiving a written oath of obedience (an English custom) from the abbots-elect, a task both refused to perform.

Upon his death in 1101, Gilbert was succeeded to the bishopric of Lisieux by Fulcher, the illiterate brother of Ranulf Flambard, and then, upon Fulcher's death, by Ranulf's son Thomas, who was only twelve years of age, leading to major controversy.

== The Defence of Dover Castle ==
William the Conqueror granted the Manor of Deptford or West Greenwich to Gilbert Magminot or Maminot, bishop of Lisieux, one of the eight barons associated with John de Fiennes for the defence of Dover Castle. These eight barons had to provide between them 112 soldiers, 25 of whom were always to be on duty within the castle, and the rest to be ready for any emergency. Gilbert de Maminot's share of the lands amounted to 24 knight's fees as follows: two in Pevington, two in Eastwell, two in Davington, one in Cocklescombe, three in Thornden, three in Waldershare, two in Kennington, two in Cowdham, one in Billingham, one in Hartwell, one of Hugh Cheriton, one of Ralph Rovery, two of Roger Barham and one of Simon Wellard, which together made up the barony of Maminot, held at Deptford as the head of the barony.

In 1814 John Lyon wrote that Maminot built a castle, or castellated mansion, for himself at Deptford, of which all traces had by then long since been buried in their ruins, but from the remains of some ancient foundations which had been discovered the site was probably on the brow of Broomfield, near the Mast Dock and adjacent to Sayes Court.

There is little known about de Magminot after he was appointed Marshal of Dover Castle. He was said to have had a son, Hugh, from whom Walkelin Maminot, who held Dover Castle against the Empress Maud was descended.
