= John Evelyn the Younger =

English translator

John Evelyn the younger (1655–1699) was an English translator.

== Life ==
Evelyn was the third but eldest surviving son of John Evelyn, born 19 January 1655. On 13 December 1660, his father presented him to the queen mother, who made much of him. Until 1662, he was 'brought up amongst Mr. Howard's children at Arundel House.’ In 1665, Edmund Bohun became his tutor. In early 1667, he was sent to Trinity College, Oxford, under Ralph Bathurst.

He left Oxford in March 1669, and was admitted to the Middle Temple on 2 May 1672. On 29 March 1673, his father took him to see Peter Gunning, Bishop of Chichester, who gave him instructions and advice 'before he received the Holy Sacrament.' On 25 May of the same year, he became a younger brother of Trinity House, and on 10 November 1675, he went to France in the suite of the ambassador Lord Berkeley, returning in May of the next year.

In December 1687, Evelyn was employed in Devon by the treasury, as a commissioner respecting 'concealment of land.' Just a year later he was presented to William, Prince of Orange at Abingdon by Colonel Sidney and Colonel Berkeley. As a volunteer in John Lovelace, 3rd Baron Lovelace's troop he helped to secure Oxford for William.

In 1690, he purchased the chief clerkship of the treasury, but was removed within a year. He acted as a commissioner of revenue in Ireland from 1692 to 1696. He returned home seriously ill, and died in Berkeley Street, London, 24 March 1699, in his father's lifetime.

== Works ==
Evelyn translated the following works:

- 'Of Gardens. Four books. First written in Latin verse by Renatus Rapinus, and now made English,’ London, 1673, dedicated to Henry Bennet, 1st Earl of Arlington.
- 'The History of the Grand Visiers,’ London, 1677, from the French of François de Chassepol.
- Plutarch's 'Life of Alexander the Great,’ for the 'Plutarch's Lives by Several Hands' (1683–6).

To the third edition of his father's Sylva (1678) Evelyn contributed some prefatory Greek hexameters, written at the age of fifteen; and in the last chapter the second book of his version of René Rapin's Hortorum Liber was reprinted. Several poems by him are printed in John Dryden's 'Miscellanies' and in John Nichols's 'Collection of Poems.'

== Family ==
Evelyn married, in 1679, Martha, daughter and co-heiress of Richard Spenser, a Turkey merchant. She died on 13 September 1726. They had two sons and three daughters, but only a son, John, and a daughter, Elizabeth (wife of Simon Harcourt, son of Simon Harcourt, 1st Viscount Harcourt), survived infancy.

Their son John, born on 1 March 1682, married Anne, daughter of Edward Boscawen of Cornwall, on 18 September 1750. He was made a baronet 30 July 1713, built a library at the family seat of Wotton House, became a fellow of the Royal Society, and served as a commissioner of customs. He died on 18 July 1763.

His grandson Sir Frederick Evelyn, a soldier, died without issue in 1812. His estates passed to his widow, Mary, daughter of William Turton of Staffordshire, who bequeathed them on her death in 1817 to John Evelyn, a direct descendant of George Evelyn (1530–1603), and grandfather of William John Evelyn. John, a first cousin of Frederick, became the fourth baronet. With the death of this Sir John's brother, Hugh, in 1848, the baronetcy became extinct.
