= John Evelyn's Diary =

Book by John Evelyn (1620–1706)

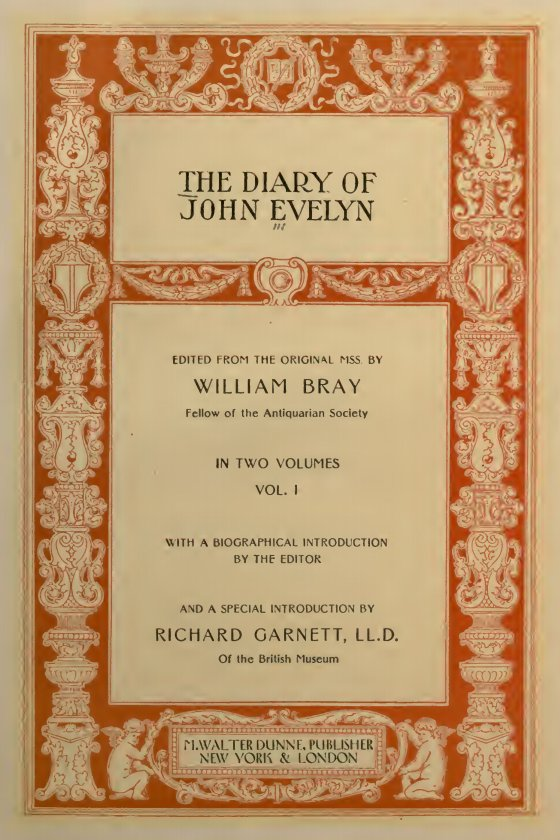
Cover of Evelyn's diary

The diary of John Evelyn (31 October 1620 – 27 February 1706), a gentlemanly Royalist and virtuoso of the seventeenth century, was first published in 1818 (2nd edition, 1819) under the title Memoirs Illustrative of the Life and Writings of John Evelyn, in an edition by William Bray. Bray was assisted by William Upcott, who had access to the Evelyn family archives. The diary of Evelyn's contemporary Samuel Pepys was first published in 1825, and became more celebrated; but the publication of Evelyn's work in part prompted the attention given to Pepys's.

Evelyn's diary has entries running from 1640, when the author was a student at the Middle Temple, to 1706. Its claim to be a diary, as opposed to a memoir, is not strict; up to around 1683 the entries were not daily additions, but were compiled much later from notes, and show in some cases the benefits of hindsight. When his travels are described, buildings or pictures may be described anachronistically, revealing the later use of other sources.

== Editions ==
After Bray's initial editing and selection, other editors worked on the Diary in the following century. A revised edition in 1827 was edited by Upcott, and was reprinted in 4 volumes in 1879 with a Life by Henry Benjamin Wheatley (reissued in 1906). There was a four-volume edition by John Forster (1850–1852). A later edition was by Austin Dobson (3 vols., 1906).

The total number of words in the manuscript is over half a million, of which Bray's edition printed under 60%. A modern scholarly edition, in six volumes, edited by Esmond Samuel de Beer was published by Clarendon Press in 1955, a project originating in the early 1930s. The Oxford Standard Authors edition of the Diary, edited by E. S. de Beer from his six-volume edition, was first published by Oxford University Press in 1959.
