= Sayes Court =

Manor house in Deptford, London, England

Coordinates: 51.484941°N 0.028790°W

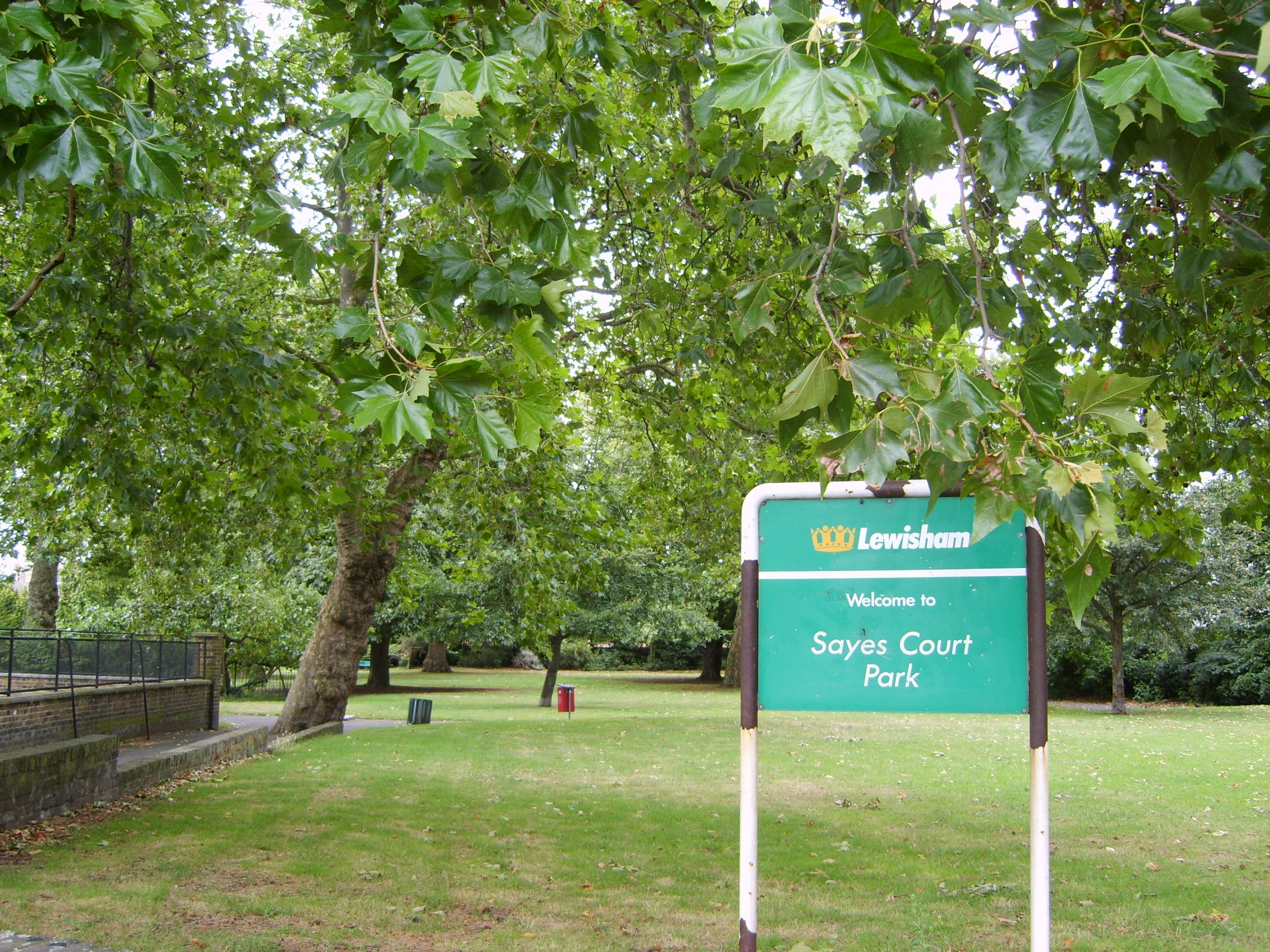
Sayes Court Park in 2008

Sayes Court was a manor house and garden in Deptford, in the London Borough of Lewisham on the Thames Path and in the former parish of St Nicholas. Sayes Court once attracted throngs to visit its celebrated garden created by the seventeenth century diarist John Evelyn. Now completely buried beneath Convoys Wharf and Sayes Court Park, the area shows little sign of its former glory, despite having been a key factor in the creation of the National Trust.

== History ==
=== Earliest information ===
The Manor of Deptford was bestowed upon Gilbert de Magminot or Maminot by William the Conqueror and this is where he held the head of the barony of Maminot. In 1814 John Lyon wrote that Maminot built a castle, or castellated mansion, for himself at Deptford. Lyon noted that all traces had by then long since been buried in their ruins, but from the remains of some ancient foundations which had been discovered, the site was probably on the brow of Broomfield, near the Mast Dock and adjacent to Sayes Court.

Gilbert de Magminot's great-grandson, Walkelin Maminot, dying without issue in 1191, the manor fell to the share of his sister and co-heir Alice, the wife of Geoffrey de Saye. The ownership of the manor can then be traced until after the death of Charles I, when it was seized by the Parliament and a survey of the manor was taken. The Manor house, Sayes Court, along with about 60 acres (240,000 m^{2}) of land, was assigned by Parliament to the Browne family, who had occupied it for several generations by then.

It was owned by Thomas Cardinal Wolsey, and in 1530 when he fell from Henry VIII's favour, it was given to Charles Brandon, 1st Duke of Suffolk and his wife, Mary, the French Queen.

=== John Evelyn at Sayes Court ===
The only known original drawing of Sayes Court house by John Evelyn, added by him (sometime between 1698 and 1706) to a 1623 map of the dockyards and town of Deptford Strond.

In 1647 Mary Browne, daughter and heir of Sir Richard Browne, married John Evelyn, the famous diarist, who hailed from Wotton in Surrey. With the Restoration of the monarchy, Sayes Court reverted once more to the Crown, but, having taken up residence in his wife's family home in 1651, Evelyn managed with difficulty to obtain a 99-year lease of the property from Charles II in 1663.

He rebuilt and enlarged the house and, inspired by French and Italian ideas, turned the surrounding orchard and pasture into one of the most influential gardens of his day.

==== The garden ====
Though all visible above-ground traces of the garden have been lost, its proposed design is shown in painstaking detail on a map of 1653, ostensibly drawn up for the benefit of Evelyn's father-in-law, who was on diplomatic posting to Paris and so absent while Evelyn was laying out the gardens. However, the high quality and detail of the plan probably meant that Evelyn intended it to be printed and published.

Adjacent to the house on the west was a walled garden "of choice flowers, and simples", that is, medicinal herbs, laid out in formal beds surrounding a large fountain. There was also an arbour under two tall elms at the north-west corner, as well as transparent glass bee-hives. This space Evelyn regarded as his own, private garden. The rest of the gardens were on a much grander scale. The main features included: a long terrace walk overlooking an elaborate box parterre; a large rectangular area ("the grove") planted with many different species of trees, inset with walks and recesses; large kitchen gardens; a great orchard of three hundred fruit trees; avenues and hedges of ash, elm, and holly; and a long walk or promenade from a banquet house set against the south wall of the garden down to an ornamental lake with an island, fruit bushes and summer house at the north end.

After the very severe winter of 1683–4, the layout of the south-west part of the garden was much simplified. The parterre was converted into a semicircle of lawn and its quadrants planted with fruit.

=== After Evelyn ===
Detail showing Sayes Court house from John Evelyn's 1653 plan of the house and garden.

In 1694 Evelyn moved back to Wotton and in June 1696 Captain Benbow signed a three-year lease on the house. Benbow proved to be a less than ideal tenant, as Evelyn was soon writing to a friend to complain that he had "the mortification of seeing everyday much of my former labours and expenses there impairing". However, much worse damage was done to the house and grounds when William III lent Sayes Court to Tsar Peter of Russia for three months in 1698. Paintings were used for target practice and the gardens were damaged by numerous wheelbarrow races. Benbow demanded compensation after the Tsar's departure, to cover his own losses and reimburse Evelyn's, and the Treasury eventually paid out the sum of £350 9s 6d (equivalent to $52,165 in 2025), in compensation. Tsar Peter also resided in a mansion house that was situated at Hughes field, Deptford.

Detail from Thomas Milton's 1753 plan of Deptford Dockyard, showing the Poore House.

After Evelyn's death in 1706 the Sayes Court estate was held in trust for his grandson, Sir John Evelyn, Baronet, as all his own male children had predeceased him. As well as almost 62 acres around Sayes Court itself, the estate comprised 159 tenements, the Red House on the site of the later navy victualling yard, a wet and dry dock afterwards called Deadman's Dock, and a water-mill.

=== 18th century ===
After Evelyn at the turn of the 18th century the estate was quickly broken up. According to Daniel Lysons writing in 1796, the Sayes Court manor house was almost entirely demolished in 1728, and the remainder converted into a workhouse. However Thomas Milton's 1753 plan of Deptford Dockyard shows the house, as the "Poore house", with still a similar footprint to that on John Evelyn's plan of 1653.

=== Victorian era ===
The extent of Sayes Court Gardens in 1914 and the location of the Manor House.

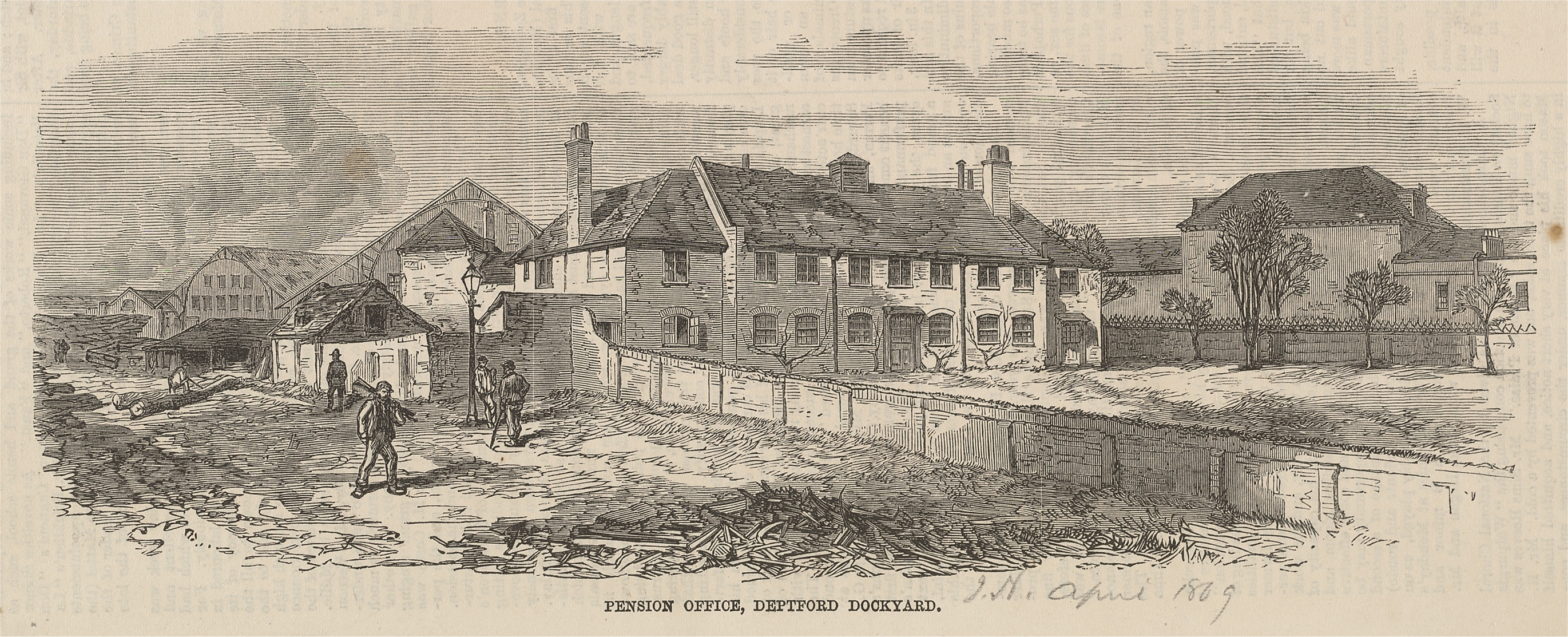
The Pension Office, Deptford Dockyard, in 1869.

It remained the St Nicholas parish workhouse from 1759 to 1848. In 1852 it was used as a penal transportation depot, and in 1853 it was a factory for transportee clothing. In 1856 the whole site was sold to the Admiralty.

In 1869, on the closing of the dockyard, William John Evelyn, a descendant of John Evelyn, purchased back from the Government as much of the site of Sayes Court as was available. By 1876 he was turning some into a recreation ground for his Deptford tenants; all plants and turf being brought from Wotton. By 1877 a 14-acre (57,000 m^{2}) portion of the old gardens had been secured, four of these remaining attached to the old house, which in 1881 he made into almshouses. The public garden and playground was about 10 acres (40,000 m^{2}) in extent. It had been carefully laid out with grass, plants, and edged with flowers and shrubs. In part it was planted with trees, and intersected by broad and level walks. In the centre of the ground was a bandstand; and in the north-west corner there was a large neoclassical building, formerly the Dockyard's Admiralty Model house, which was intended to serve as a museum and library, under the management of the Goldsmiths' Company.

==== The part played in the formation of the National Trust ====
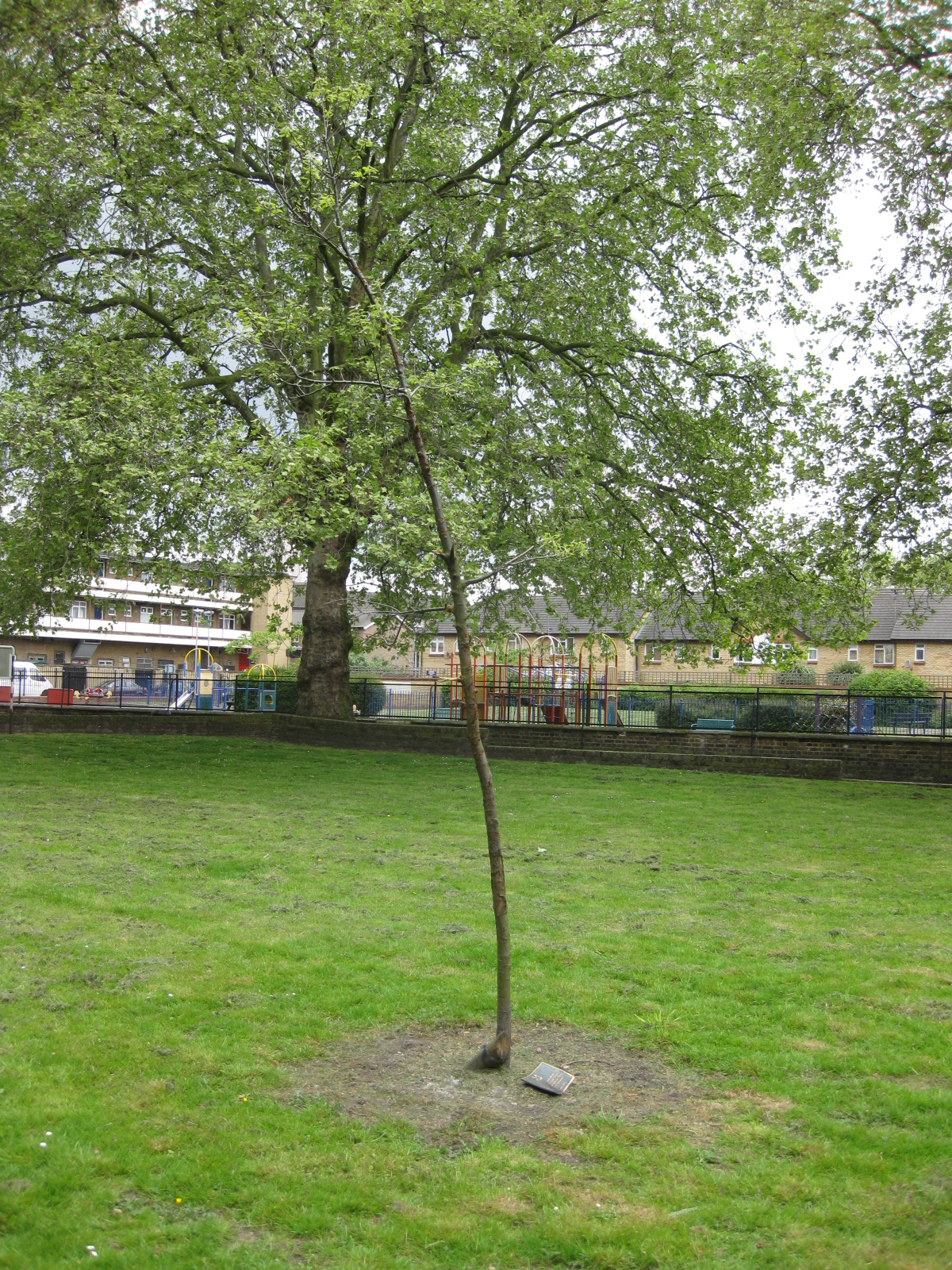
Vandalised oak sapling, planted to mark the key role Octavia Hill and Sayes Court played in the formation of the National Trust.

In 1884 W. J. Evelyn approached Octavia Hill with the suggestion that the garden should become publicly owned and offering the hall which could be used as a museum, but there was as yet no organisation with the necessary legal powers for holding the property for permanent preservation. Robert Hunter advised that they should set up a land company with the aim of protecting "the public interests in the open spaces of the country". Octavia Hill proposed that this company be called "the Commons and Gardens Trust", but it was Hunter's suggestion, the "National Trust", that was adopted. Unfortunately, the Trust took ten years to reach the point where it could be properly constituted, by which time the opportunity to take ownership of Sayes Court had passed.

In 1886 some 6 acres (24,000 m^{2}) still remained of the estate and of these W.J. Evelyn dedicated an acre and a half in perpetuity to the public. Until then the only other piece of land that had ever been given to the London public was Leicester Square. In this acre and a half the Kyrle Society laid out a park, a playground and a bandstand. A permanent provision was made for the Evelyn estate to cover the expense of maintenance and caretaking. It was opened on 20 July 1886 by Baroness Burdett-Coutts.

In his history The National Trust: The First Hundred Years, Merlin Waterson writes "It would be hard to conceive of a property which encompassed so many of the future purposes of the National Trust. The garden was of exceptional importance, the historical associations fascinating, and it was a valuable open space in the heart of London Docks."

=== World War I and between the wars ===
The War Department hired Sayes Court, from the City of London Corporation from 19 September 1914 to use as a Horse Transport Reserve Depot at a rental of £90 per annum (equivalent to $8,979 in 2025) to enlarge its Supply Reserve Depot at the adjacent former Foreign Cattle Market.

The fee simple of the Foreign Cattle Market and of the Sayes Court property were purchased by the War Department, for £400,500 (equivalent to $21,165,521 in 2025) under deeds dated 25 March 1926, 18 March 1927 & 25 July 1927 including the railway, tramway, wharfage and jetty rights and easements.

By 1938 the almshouses had become the headquarters, while the former model house now served as the Officers Mess. Tramways (18" gauge with track weighing 35 lbs. per yard) had been laid and some areas of the Victorian park remained intact within the depot.

=== World War II ===
During World War II, on 16 August 1944, the Victorian Terrace existing along the Grove Street side of Sayes Court was destroyed by a V-1 flying bomb.

=== Second half of the 20th century ===
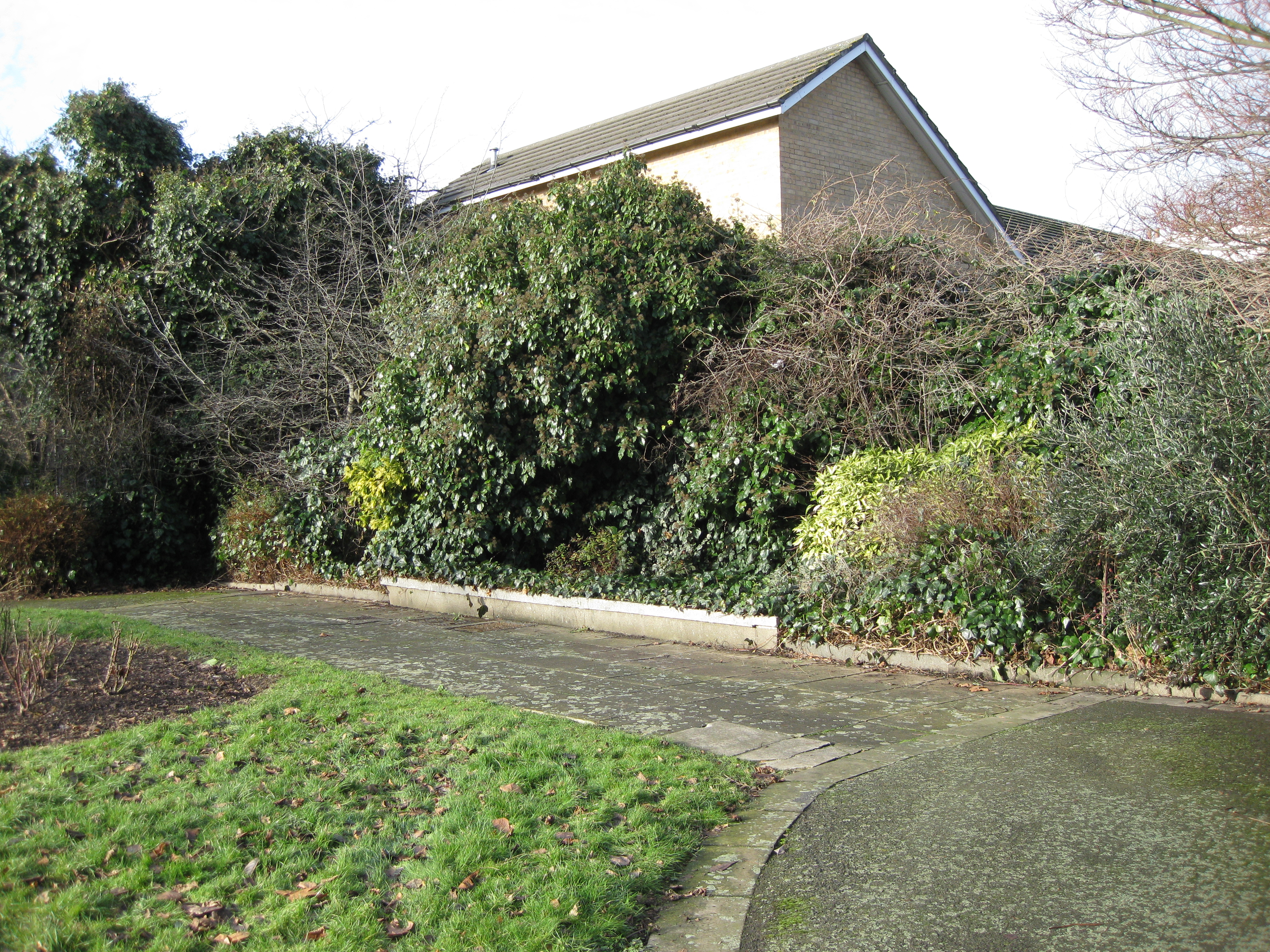
Now disused and overgrown; in 1951 there were flower beds and a small pool fed by a spout in the form of a frog here.

By the end of the war all that remained of the Sayes Court estate was a public garden of less than 2 acres (8,100 m^{2}) and about an acre covering the sites of the bombed houses and a school.

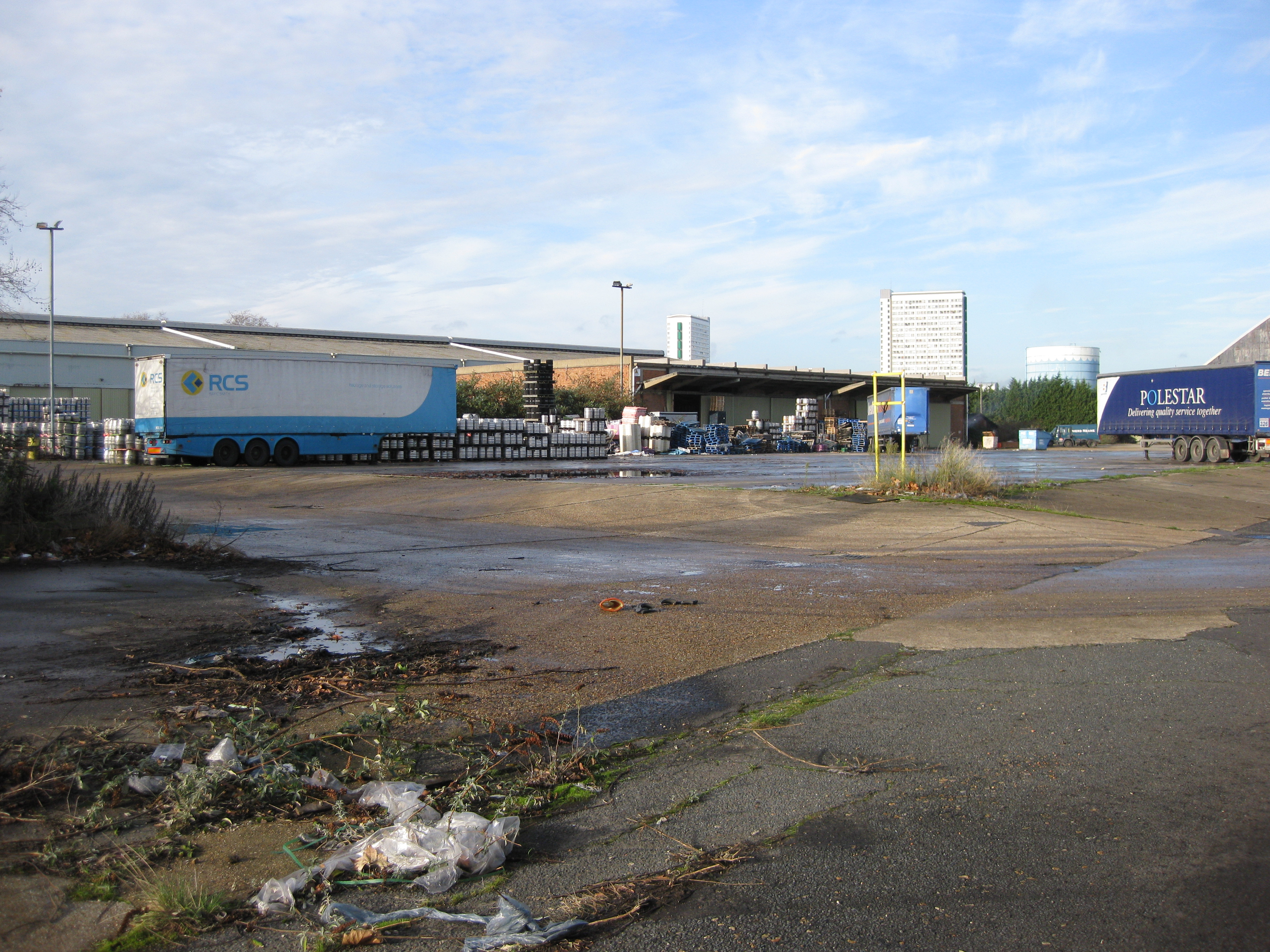
The location of Sayes Court manor house in 2009, from a similar viewpoint to the 1910 photo.

The London County Council decided to redesign the whole of this area. The resulting park included a well-equipped children's playground, a paddling pool with a fountain over artificial rocks, a heated playroom some 30 ft by 15 ft (4.6 m), with a room for an attendant at one side and on the other staff offices, lavatories and a shelter with tables and chairs facing onto a formal garden with flower beds and grass plots. At the far end of this formal garden were flower beds and a small pool fed by a spout in the form of a frog. The park opened on 29 May 1951.

In 1993 the Greenwich and Lewisham (London Borough Boundaries) Order transferred the site from the London Borough of Greenwich to the London Borough of Lewisham.

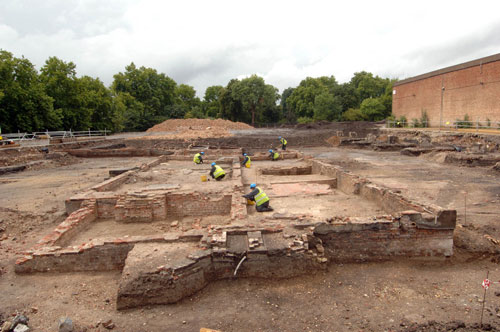
MOLA archaeologists expose the surviving walls of Sayes Court. Image looking west

=== 2011 investigation by Museum of London Archaeology ===
As part of Museum of London Archaeology's excavation at Convoys Wharf (the site of the former Deptford Royal Dockyard), Museum of London Archaeology (MOLA) unearthed the remains of Sayes Court.. The excavation identified the plan of Sayes Court, as modified in the course of its history, with ground floor walls surviving up to a metre high in places. The front door of the building in the southwest wall opened into a central hallway, with a pair of rooms either side. The hallway led to the back of the building and a further four rooms. A cellar occupied the northwest part of the building, accessed by a stair in the north corner and later by a flight of stone steps added onto the northwest wall.

=== Present ===
The current Sayes Court Park (as of 2010) only incorporates the western edge of John Evelyn's Garden, and most of it overlies the area originally shown on Evelyn's map of 1653 as the 'Broome Field'. The boundary wall of Evelyn's garden follows a line extended from the eastern edge of the modern Sayes Court Street.

The site of Sayes Court forms part of Convoys Wharf, which is currently owned by Hutchison Whampoa Limited and subject to a planning application to convert it into approximately 3,500 residential units, and 73,000 sq metres of commercial space although part of this has safeguarded wharf status.

In September 2011 a group of local residents launched a campaign, with the name Deptford Is.. to oppose the masterplan proposed by the developers. They have proposed a couple of projects to connect to the history of the area and benefit the local community. These are the Lenox Project and Sayes Court Garden.

In October 2013 the site was added to the World Monuments Fund's 2014 watch list. On 31 March 2014 the Mayor of London, Boris Johnson, approved plans to build up to 3,500 new homes on the Convoys Wharf site that has been derelict for 14 years.

In 2017 a locally led amenity group called DeptfordFolk nominated the 300-year-old mulberry tree for the Woodland Trust's Tree of the Year award. As a result of the campaign a small grant was awarded which led to the installation of new supports for the tree limbs. The grant was match-funded by Lewisham Council. The nomination was part of Evelyn200, a project that also saw the planting of three new trees in the park including two new white mulberry trees and a Turkish hazelnut.

== Other places named after Sayes Court ==
- Sayes Court, Christ Church, Barbados
- Sayes Court, Addlestone, Surrey, UK
- Sayes Court, Wellington, New Zealand
- Sayes Court, Isle of Sheppey
