= Claygate =

Village and parish in Surrey, England

Coordinates: 51.360°N 0.342°W

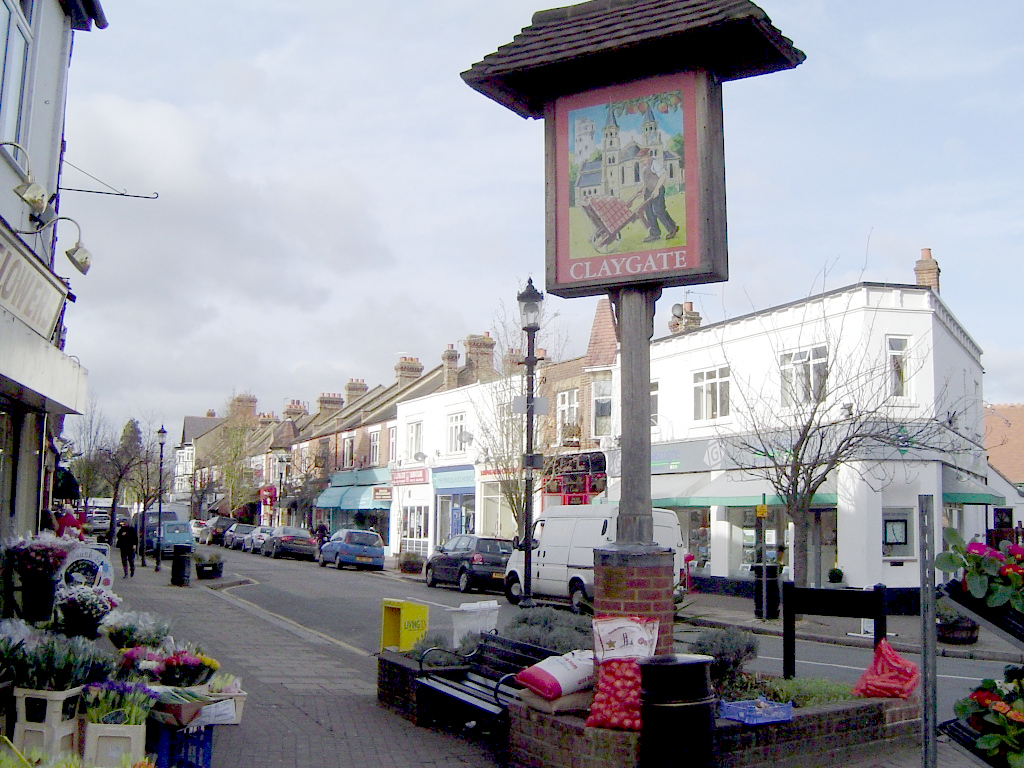
- Claygate Parade and village sign, showing bricks and the Claygate Pearmain

- Location within Surrey
- Area: 4.71 km^{2} (1.82 sq mi)
- Population: 7,168 (Civil Parish 2011)
  - Density: 1,522/km^{2} (3,940/sq mi)
- OS grid reference: TQ1563
  - London: 14 1/4 mi (23 km)
- Civil parish: Claygate
- District: Elmbridge
- Shire county: Surrey
- Region: South East
- Country: England
- Sovereign state: United Kingdom
- Post town: Esher
- Postcode district: KT10
- Dialling code: 01372; 020 (small part)
- Police: Surrey
- Fire: Surrey
- Ambulance: South East Coast
- UK Parliament: Esher and Walton

Claygate is an affluent suburban village in Surrey, England, 14 miles (23 kilometres) southwest of central London. It is the only civil parish in the borough of Elmbridge. Adjoining Esher and Hinchley Wood to the west and north respectively, and bordered by green belt land to the south and east, Claygate lies within the Greater London Built-up Area.

Claygate was once in the main manor of Thames Ditton, but is now administered from Esher. It is primarily residential and has a small number of offices, outlying farms and two small shopping areas, the Old Village and the Parade, with hair and beauty shops, a supermarket, five pubs and a number of restaurants.

Claygate lies on the Claygate Beds, a clay formation up to 15 metres (50 feet) thick, which extends well beyond the village. These beds are the youngest part of the London Clay geological formation, forming a transition between the clay and the sandier Bagshot Beds above.

== History ==
=== Etymology ===
Claygate may have its name from the clay pits in the village that provided bricks for a large surrounding area including some of Hampton Court Palace. Claygate's lack of main thoroughfares has been attributed to the angle of the River Thames leading the A307 main road (from London) south-west instead through Esher, as well as historical conditions where through roads became impassible in wet weather because of the clay; often close to the surface. Equally, mid-distance routes chose a line to avoid this land, before the advent of road surfacing, such as those through Tolworth and Esher.

=== Manor ===
Claygate appears in the Domesday Book of 1086 as a manor of Thames Ditton, Claigate. This main manor of the village was held by Westminster Abbey. Its domesday assets were: 1/2 hide; 2 ploughs, 5 acres (2 hectares) of meadow, woodland worth 1 hog. It rendered £2 10s 0d per year to its overlords. The manor descended (after its purchase in 1565) from the Vincent family to the Evelyn family. Much land remained in the manor when it was sold between 1718 and 1721 to the Earl of Lovelace, the King family and currently Locke King family who had sold the vast majority of its land by 1970.

=== Other medieval history ===
Claygate was formed as an ecclesiastical parish from Thames Ditton in 1841. Scant remains were traced in boundary lines of an early medieval track running from Kingston Hill to the ford of the Mole near to a square entrenchment in Leatherhead almost in Stoke D'Abernon.

=== 19th century ===
In about 1822 the Claygate Pearmain apple was discovered by John Braddick, growing in a hedge here. In 1840 its church, Holy Trinity, was built of stone in 14th-century style, with a tower, enlarged in 1860, and restored in 1902. The school was built in 1838 as a Church school, and enlarged in 1849. It was rebuilt by the School Board of Thames Ditton in 1885. Claygate has a Baptist chapel, built in 1861.

Claygate's development chiefly was in the 60 years after the construction of its railway line and station (on the New Guildford Line); the station opened in 1885.

With commanding views over the surrounding countryside is Ruxley Towers, a Neo-Gothic Victorian edifice constructed by Lord Foley who owned a considerable amount of land. On the other side of the village is Telegraph Hill where a semaphore station was built in 1822 to transmit messages between the Admiralty and Portsmouth.

=== 20th century ===
In 1911 brick and tile production works, rather than retail sites, continued to employ men near the station in the 1910s. In 1911 Claygate was under the same urban council as Thames Ditton.

=== 21st century ===
The Al-Hilli family who were killed in the Annecy shootings in France, lived in Claygate.

== Geography ==
Claygate's topsoil rests upon the youngest beds of the London Clay after which the village is named, here capped in places by sand in the southern part of the civil parish. Claygate has its own parish council. Apart from an interweave of streets with Esher, Claygate is surrounded by woodlands and open countryside, including Claygate Common, Princes Covert, Winney Hill, Surbiton Golf Course, Telegraph Hill, Littleworth Common and Arbrook Common. Much of the outlying farmland is used for grazing ponies, two farms are run for cultivation. The Rythe is a major stream running north through Claygate, and as a responsive channel in the clay basins has been implicated in late 20th century flash flooding in small pockets of the village: a major flood alleviation scheme has been completed which commenced in 2002. The centre-to-centre distance from London is 14 1/4 miles (23 kilometres).

Many of Claygate's residents commute to the capital using the train services, see Transport. Claygate is in the relatively small area between the M25 and Kingston-upon-Thames. Constrained by the Green Belt, demand has resulted in Claygate being subject to a level of permitted in-fill and back-garden development.

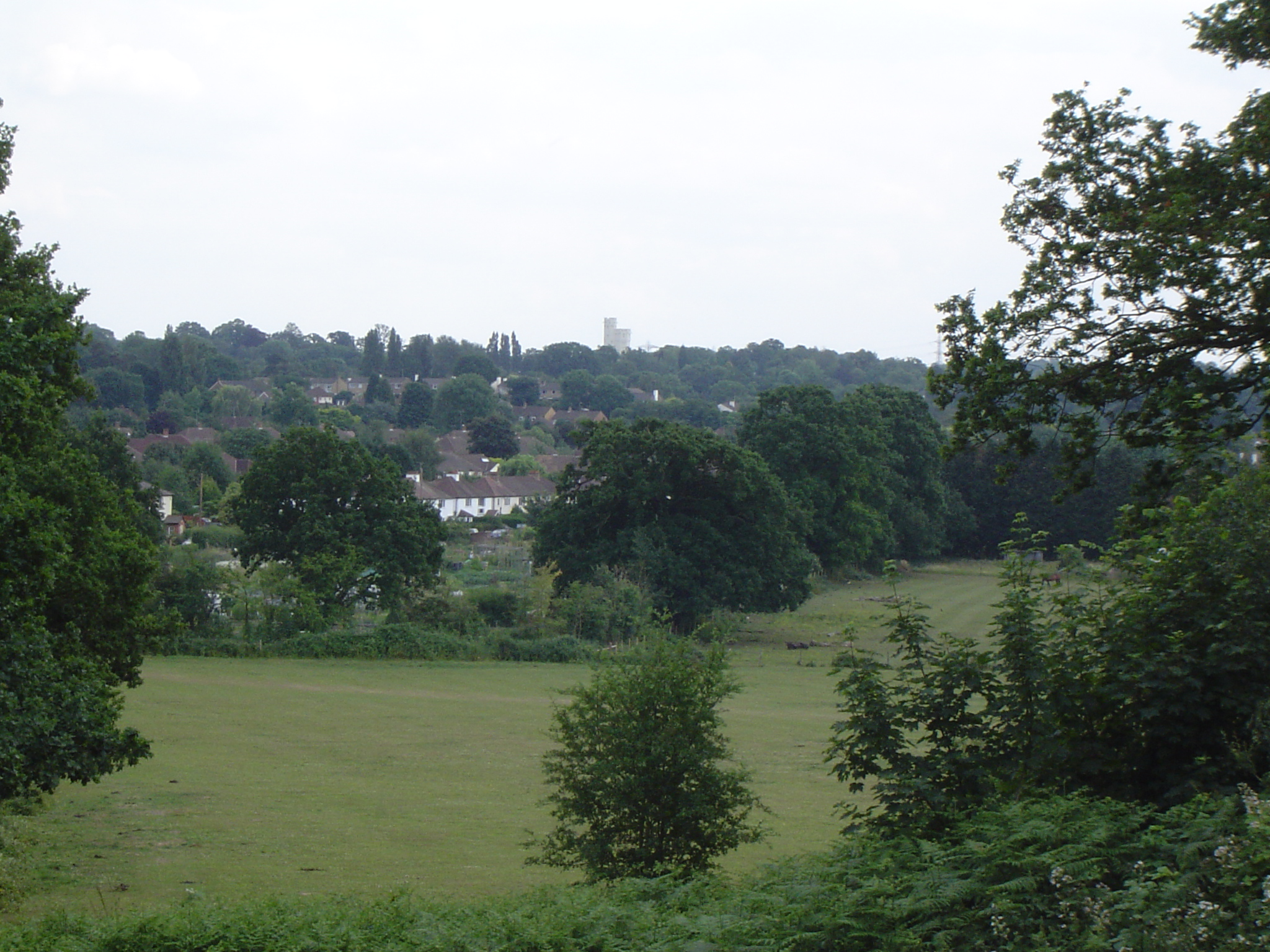
View over Claygate from Telegraph Hill to Ruxley Towers

== Commerce and services ==
"The Parade" is the larger of Claygate's two shopping areas. It starts at Claygate railway station and continues through The Parade itself into Hare Lane.

Claygate has five pubs: one of the annual village traditions is a Boxing Day tour of these by Morris dancers.

Local newspapers covering Claygate include The Surrey Advertiser, The Surrey Comet and The Herald, and two freely distributed newspapers, The Informer and The Guardian. Claygate is in the editorial area of BBC Surrey, although its proximity to London means all of the capital's radio stations can be heard.

There are several small farms in Claygate; many of the farms are or incorporate horseriding centres.

== Community ==
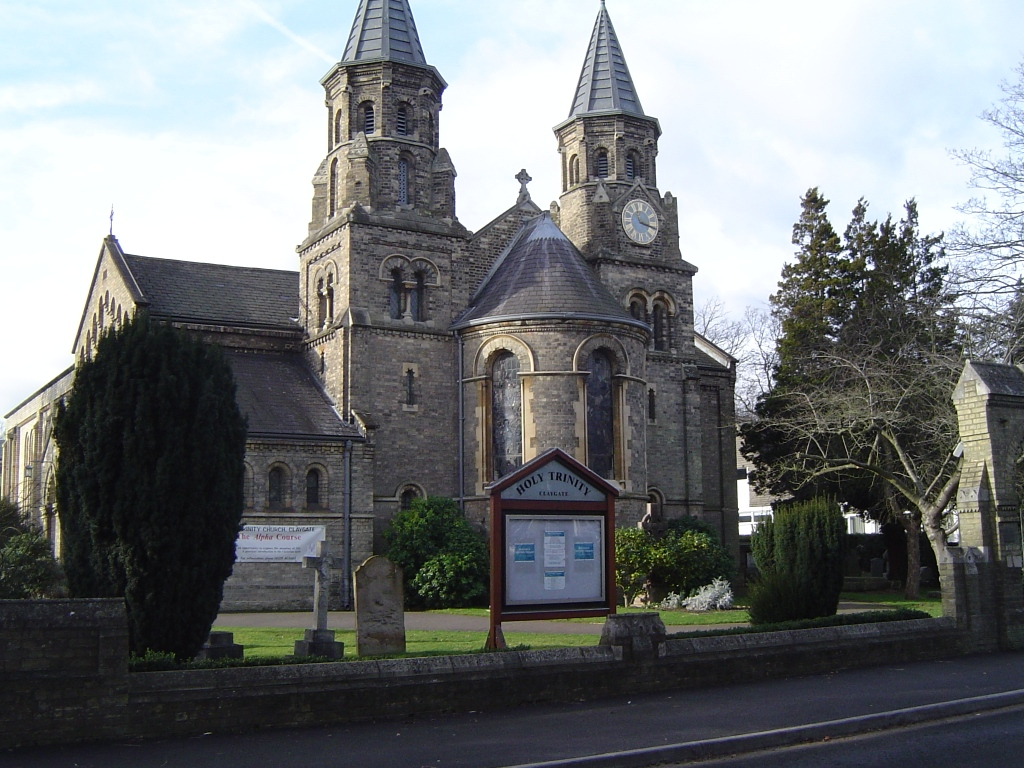
Holy Trinity Church

Established in 1885, Claygate (Primary) School initially stood on Elm Road. Although the Infant School closed a little after celebrating its centenary, 'The Firs', which served as the Junior School, transitioned into the primary site. Later in the 20th century, the original school building was repurposed to house Claygate's Youth Centre/Community Centre and the Capelfield surgery. Additionally, Rowan Preparatory School operates as a private independent institution, offering nursery and primary education specifically for girls.

The local Anglican church, "Holy Trinity," constructed in 1840, stands out due to its unique dual spires. The community also houses the First Church of Christ Scientist. For adherents of Roman Catholicism, the Church of the Holy Name, located on Arbrook Lane in Esher, offers services.

The Claygate Village Association is a non-political charity founded in 1946; it organises some of the key village events; the Christmas lights, The Claygate Music Festival, the Claygate Gardens Trail, Claygate in Bloom and for the first time in 2014, the Claygate Spring Festival. The village is served with medical support by Capelfield Surgery. Community groups, clubs, and sports teams. include Claygate Cricket Club and Claygate Royals Football Club. A major annual event is the Claygate Flower & Village Show which takes place on the Recreation Ground in late July each year. 2013 saw the 100th show, where there were 7,000 visitors.

A monthly magazine covers the borough with one other edition nationally, Living Within.

== Education ==
Claygate is served by a mix of state and independent schools that also serve the areas of Esher and Hinchley Wood, all of which share the KT10 postcode.

=== State Primary Schools ===
- Esher Church School
- Cranmere Primary
- Hinchley Wood Primary
- Claygate Primary

=== Independent Primary Schools ===
- Rowan Preparatory School
- Shrewsbury House Pre-Prep
- Milbourne Lodge

=== State Secondary Schools ===
- Esher College
- Esher Church of England High School
- Hinchley Wood School

=== Independent Secondary Schools ===
- Milbourne Lodge
- Claremont Fan Court

== In arts and the media ==
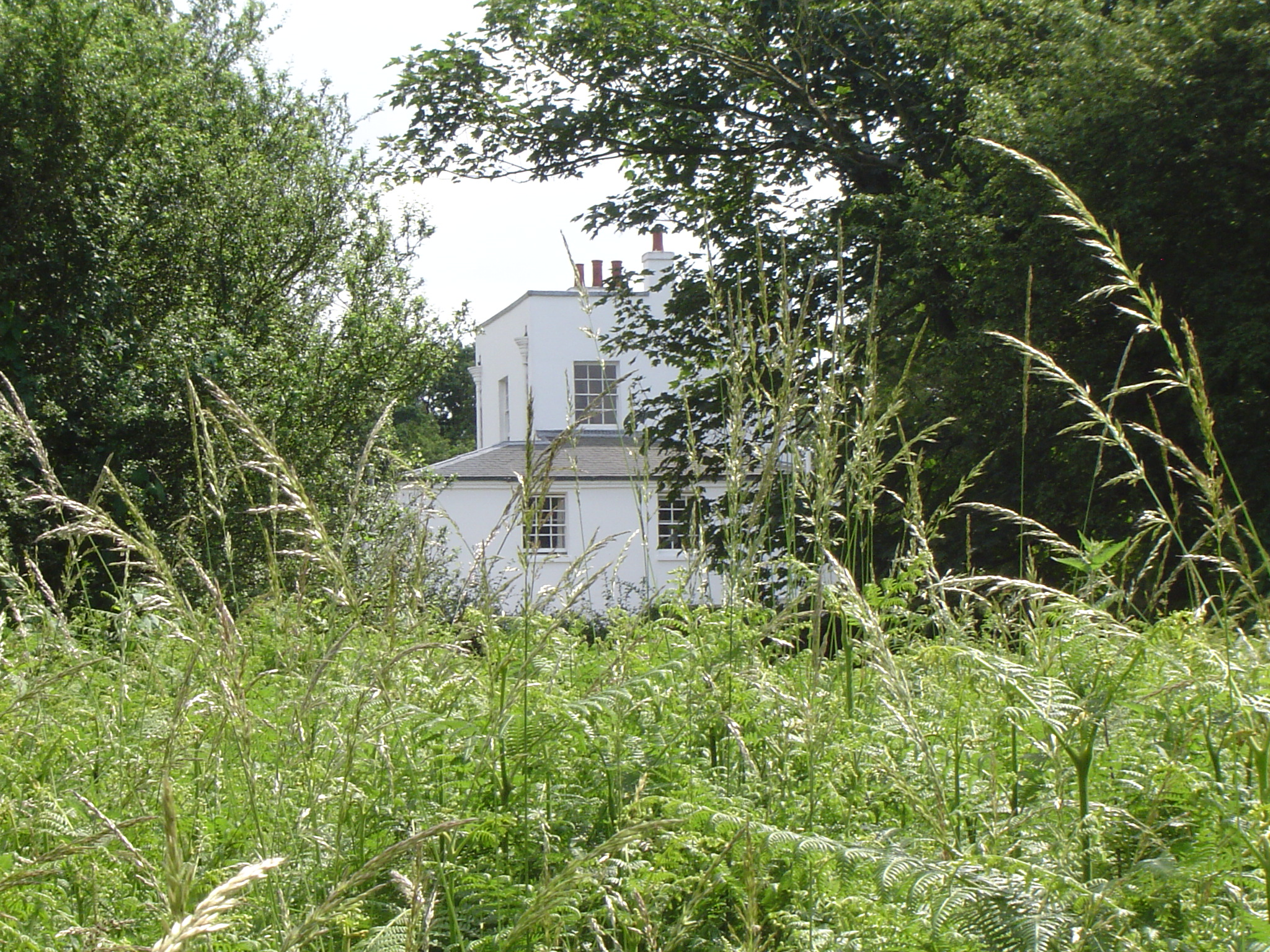
Semaphore House on Telegraph Hill

Filming carried out in Claygate includes:

- The Loneliness of the Long Distance Runner (Tony Richardson 1961) starring Tom Courtenay, set at Ruxley Towers (Ruxton Towers in the film) and showing much of the surrounding countryside before the construction of the Esher By-pass.
- The BBC TV situation comedy Wyatt's Watchdogs which starred Brian Wilde and Trevor Bannister and was about a Neighbourhood Watch group.
- Never the Twain (1981) which used the Greek Vine restaurant (now Averna, an Italian restaurant) frontage on The Green as the shop fronts. The Thames Television sitcom starred Windsor Davies and Donald Sinden as two grumpy antique shop owners.
- A sketch for The Two Ronnies

Previous residents of Claygate include "Python" Terry Jones, "Rolling Stone" Ronnie Wood, and presenter/actor Michael Aspel. British historian Frances Yates (1899-1980), a longtime resident, is buried in the churchyard at Holy Trinity church. Claygate often has a celebrity to switch on its Christmas lights. These have included Cliff Richard, Gloria Hunniford, Tony Stamp and Roger Valentine from The Bill, Bernie Nolan, Mick Hucknall, Ronnie Wood, Anthea Turner and most recently Bobby Davro.

== Transport ==
Rail

Claygate railway station is managed by South Western Railway, which operates all services. Trains run to London Waterloo via Surbiton and to Guildford via Effingham Junction.

Buses

Claygate is served by London Buses' route K3 to Esher, Surbiton, Kingston and Roehampton Vale, operated by London United.

Roads

The A3 trunk road has its Hinchley Wood and Esher (A309) spur road directly north of Claygate allowing a traffic-lit junction with convenient access to/from London, and second junction by the Scilly Isles Roundabout with access to Hampton Court Bridge for journeys north.

A third A3 junction is almost 2 km along Copsem Lane to the south for journeys towards the south-west and west, Wisley interchange or for journeys east, continuing south along the A245 to the Leatherhead Common junction of the M25.

== Demography ==
The proportion of households in Claygate who owned their home outright was 8.5% above the regional average. The proportion who owned their home with a loan was 4.0% higher than the regional average; providing overall a lower proportion than average of rented residential property and of social housing relative to the average in Surrey, the district and the national average. As with neighbouring Esher, Claygate has a large number of very large properties (mansions). These are concentrated within the Ruxley Private Estate, on the Esher-Claygate border and in the roads to the south of the railway station.

2011 Census Key Statistics
Output area	Population	Households	% Owned outright	% Owned with a loan	hectares
Claygate (CP)	7,168	2,788	41.0	39.1	471

== Politics ==
Claygate is served by a parish council made up of 10 elected representatives. The parish council has some responsibilities, acquired from Surrey County and Elmbridge Borough Councils, such as highway, garden sites and tree planting. The parish council is also influential in its responses to planning applications in the area.

Claygate is in the parliamentary constituency of Esher and Walton, which from its inception in 1997 until 2024 had been a relatively safe seat for the Conservative Party. The local MP since 2024 is Monica Harding. Local government is administered by Elmbridge Borough Council and Surrey County Council.

At Surrey County Council, one of its 81 councillors represents the area within the Hinchley Wood, Claygate and Oxshott division.

At Elmbridge Borough Council all wards of the borough are deemed appropriate to be represented under the current constitution of councillors by three councillors.

Elmbridge Borough Councillors
Election	Member	Ward
	Mary Marshall	Claygate
2016	Alex Coomes	Claygate
?	Mike Rollings	Claygate

Surrey County Councillor
Election	Member	Electoral Division
2025	Andrew Burton	Hinchley Wood, Claygate and Oxshott

Next station upwards	Admiralty Semaphore line 1822	Next station downwards
Coombe Warren	Cooper's Hill (Telegraph Hill)	Chatley Heath
