= Barrow boy =

British expression

Barrow boy is a British expression with two meanings, occupational and social. Street traders since the 19th century (and perhaps earlier) sold seasonal goods (especially vegetables) from two-wheeled barrows. London street traders were called costermongers (from costard, the mediaeval word for apple) and more generally barrow boys, since anything could be sold from a barrow (including clothes, crockery, etc.)

London's banks and investment brokerages were, since their foundation, privileged enclaves of wealth and high social standing. After modernisation in the 1980s they ceased to be preserves of class privilege, and Cockneys of proven ability were employed as traders; such staff might be sneered at as "barrow boys" by traditionalist bankers or brokers.

In British mountain rescue terminology, a barrow boy is the person who guides a stretcher during a crag (steep rugged mass of rock) rescue. Conventionally there are two barrow boys, one at each end of a horizontal stretcher (though it may be vertical) which may contain a casualty. The barrow boys may operate on fixed or moving ropes, and guide the progress of the stretcher to safer ground.

== See also ==
- Mountain rescue in England and Wales
- Costermonger
