= St Rule pear =

Variety of edible fruit

St Rule pears, also called regul pears, were a luxury pear variety in the Middle Ages. The pears were probably named after St. Rule, the 3rd century Bishop of Arles. They reportedly grew around Normandy and possibly also in the area of La Rochelle. According to a record from 1223, the pears cost 10 shillings for 100 pears compared with 12 shillings for 600 apples. This is probably the oldest literary mention of the St Rule pear, which were reportedly part of King Henry III's daily fruit shipment from Paris on his journey back to London. Edward I reportedly received "700 Regul pears and 300 Costard apples" during his stay at Berwick Castle. There are also records of Henry de Lacy purchasing the pears for Wiltshire at Amesbury.
