= Esher and Walton =

UK Parliament constituency (since 1997)

Coordinates: 51.38°N 0.38°W

- Borough constituency for the House of Commons
- Interactive map of boundaries from 2024
- Boundary of Esher and Walton in South East England
- County: Surrey
- Electorate: 73,280 (2023)
- Major settlements: Esher; Walton-on-Thames; Molesey; Claygate

Current constituency
- Created: 1997
- Member of Parliament: Monica Harding (Liberal Democrats)
- Seats: One
- Created from: Esher; Chertsey & Walton

Esher and Walton (/ˌiːʃər ... ˈwɔːltən/ is a constituency in Surrey represented in the House of Commons of the UK Parliament. (Note: As with all constituencies, Esher and Walton elects one Member of Parliament (MP) by the first past the post system of election at most every five years.) Since 2024, it has been represented by Monica Harding of the Liberal Democrats. Before this, Dominic Raab of the Conservative Party, who served as deputy prime minister before resigning from that role in April 2023 due to bullying allegations, had served as the MP from 2010.

== Constituency profile ==
Esher and Walton is more than half of the Borough of Elmbridge in Surrey, to be in East Surrey from April 2027. Studded with well-kept green spaces - and keeping some such buffers to its north-east - it is due to its few contiguous neighbourhoods recognised economically and in academic geography as part of London's built-up area. Settlements comprise the populous towns of Esher and Walton-on-Thames and their attached villages of Molesey, Long Ditton/Thames Ditton, Hersham and Claygate. All of the area is well-connected to central London by the South West Main Line and the triple-lane A3 road for commutes to South London, business areas by the M25, London's main airports and Guildford. The constituency is highly affluent with low levels of deprivation, and house prices are more than double the national average.

In general, residents are well-educated and have very high levels of income and professional employment. White people made up 86% of the population at the 2021 census. For the new council 11 Liberal Democrat councillors were elected in 2026, one residents' association, one Conservative.. An estimated 59% of voters here supported remaining in the European Union in the 2016 referendum, higher than the nationwide figure of 48%.

== Boundaries ==
=== Current ===
Further to the 2023 review which came into effect for the 2024 general election, the constituency comprises (as these wards existed on 1 December 2020):

- The Borough of Elmbridge wards of Claygate, Esher, Hersham Village, Hinchley Wood & Weston Green, Long Ditton, Molesey East, Molesey West, Oatlands & Burwood Park, Thames Ditton, Walton Central, Walton North, and Walton South.

The electorate was reduced to bring it within the permitted range by transferring Cobham, Oxshott and Stoke D'Abernon to Runnymede and Weybridge, partly offset by moving the village of Oatlands in the opposite direction.

=== Historic ===
From 1997, until 2024, it comprised Borough of Elmbridge wards of Claygate, Cobham and Downside, Cobham Fairmile, Esher, Hersham North, Hersham South, Hinchley Wood, Long Ditton, Molesey East, Molesey North, Molesey South, Oxshott and Stoke D'Abernon, Thames Ditton, Walton Ambleside, Walton Central, Walton North, Walton South, Weston Green. This was the borough excluding Weybridge.

== History ==
Map of 1997–2024 boundaries

Almost all of the present area had seen 'Tory' representation for 154 years – 1870 saw the death of wealthy Liberal John Ivatt Briscoe so a resultant by-election for a set-to-be-soon-divided vast tract West Surrey; he was one of two joint MPs and for his empty seat only a Tory stood. One brief and tiny exception exists; the elections of 1910 ended four years of Liberal tenure "for Chertsey" and specifically thus Weybridge parish, covering the west of today's Oatlands ward. As Briscoe co-served with a Tory, as to the vast bulk of this seat the last time its local MPs (including the pre-1885 centuries-old set-up of two co-MPs) lacked Conservatives was 1832 to 1835, when both MPs for West Surrey were Whigs, prompting 189 years of having a Conservative MP to turn to and represent the area's interests.

Ian Taylor held the seat from 1997 to 2010, having held the previous Esher seat from 1987. Taylor stood down at the 2010 election, and Dominic Raab was elected as the new Conservative MP for this seat.

For the 2019 general election, 60 seats, including this seat, were written into the Remain Alliance between the Liberal Democrats, the Green Party and Plaid Cymru not to vie against one another there. These were parties opposed to Britain's departure from the European Union. In consequence, Laura Harmour, for the Green Party, did not stand. Axel Thill, the for the Brexit Party, was one of those withdrawn by party leader Nigel Farage before nominations closed, not fielding his candidates in Conservative-held seats.

The seat, safe in terms of length of tenure but not now convincingly by percentage majority for the Conservatives, was heavily targeted by the Liberal Democrats, particularly because the incumbent Conservative, Dominic Raab, had campaigned for a Leave vote in the EU referendum. The constituency voted in favour of remaining in the EU and is socially similar to the two Greater London seats it borders, namely Twickenham and Kingston & Surbiton, which are both strongholds for the Lib Dems. This resulted in a large swing to the Liberal Democrats of 18.5%, reducing the seat's majority to make it a marginal for the first time since its creation.

Raab, who had served as the UK's Foreign Secretary two years then as deputy prime minister before resignation in April 2023 due to bullying allegations, did not contest the 2024 election and a further swing of 13.8% resulted in the Liberal Democrat Monica Harding winning the seat, a landmark change.

== Members of Parliament ==
Election	Member	Party
1997	Ian Taylor	Conservative
2010	Dominic Raab	Conservative
2024	Monica Harding	Liberal Democrats

== Elections ==
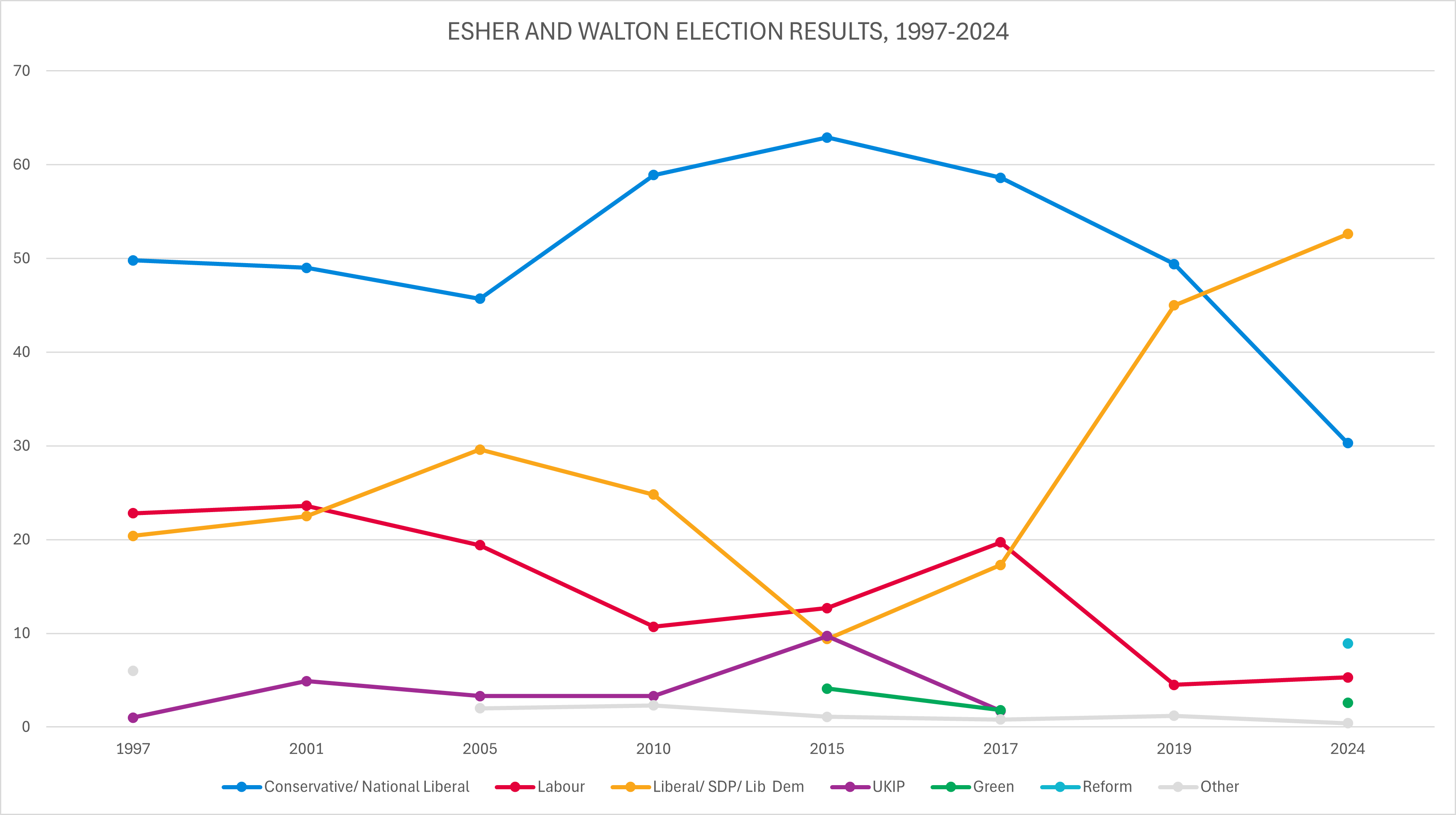
Election results 1997-2024

=== Elections in the 2020s ===
General election 2024: Esher and Walton
Party	Candidate	Votes	%	±%
Liberal Democrats	Monica Harding	28,315	52.6	+8.4
Conservative	John Cope	16,312	30.3	−19.2
Reform	Alastair Gray	4,777	8.9	N/A
Labour	Yoel Gordon	2,846	5.3	+0.5
Green	Maciej Pawlik	1,396	2.6	+2.4
SDP	Richard Bateson	234	0.4	N/A
Majority		12,003	22.3	N/A
Turnout		53,880	72.8	−3.9
Liberal Democrats gain from Conservative		Swing	+13.8	

=== Elections in the 2010s ===
2019 notional result
Party	Vote	%
Conservative	27,819	49.5
Liberal Democrats	24,804	44.2
Labour	2,698	4.8
Others	725	1.3
Green	132	0.2
Turnout	56,178	76.7
Electorate	73,280	

In 2019, Esher and Walton was one of five English seats (the others being Cheltenham, East Devon, Westmorland and Lonsdale, and Winchester) where the Labour candidate failed to get over 5% votes cast so lost the deposit.

General election 2019: Esher and Walton
Party	Candidate	Votes	%	±%
Conservative	Dominic Raab	31,132	49.4	−9.2
Liberal Democrats	Monica Harding	28,389	45.0	+27.7
Labour	Peter Ashurst	2,838	4.5	−15.2
Independent	Kylie Keens	347	0.6	N/A
Monster Raving Loony	Baron Badger	326	0.5	0.0
Advance	Kyle Taylor	52	0.1	N/A
Majority		2,743	4.4	−34.5
Turnout		63,084	77.7	+3.8
Conservative hold		Swing	−18.5	

General election 2017: Esher and Walton
Party	Candidate	Votes	%	±%
Conservative	Dominic Raab	35,071	58.6	−4.3
Labour	Lana Hylands	11,773	19.7	+7.0
Liberal Democrats	Andrew Davis	10,374	17.3	+7.9
Green	Olivia Palmer	1,074	1.8	−2.3
UKIP	David Ions	1,034	1.7	−8.0
Monster Raving Loony	Baron Badger	318	0.5	N/A
Independent	Della Reynolds	198	0.3	−0.1
Majority		23,298	38.9	−11.3
Turnout		59,842	73.9	+2.6
Conservative hold		Swing	−5.6	

General election 2015: Esher and Walton
Party	Candidate	Votes	%	±%
Conservative	Dominic Raab	35,845	62.9	+4.0
Labour	Francis Eldergill	7,229	12.7	+2.0
UKIP	Nicholas Wood	5,551	9.7	+6.4
Liberal Democrats	Andrew Davis	5,372	9.4	−15.4
Green	Olivia Palmer	2,355	4.1	N/A
CISTA	Matthew Heenan	396	0.7	N/A
Independent	Della Reynolds	228	0.4	N/A
Majority		28,616	50.2	+16.1
Turnout		56,976	71.3	−0.7
Conservative hold		Swing		

General election 2010: Esher and Walton
Party	Candidate	Votes	%	±%
Conservative	Dominic Raab	32,134	58.9	+13.2
Liberal Democrats	Lionel Blackman	13,541	24.8	−4.8
Labour	Francis Eldergill	5,829	10.7	−8.7
UKIP	Bernard Collignon	1,783	3.3	0.0
Independent	Tony Popham	378	0.7	N/A
Monster Raving Loony	Chinners Chinnery	341	0.6	−0.7
English Democrat	Mike Kearsley	307	0.6	N/A
Best of a Bad Bunch	Andy Lear	230	0.4	N/A
Majority		18,593	34.1	+18.0
Turnout		54,543	72.0	+9.8
Conservative hold		Swing	+9.0	

=== Elections in the 2000s ===
General election 2005: Esher and Walton
Party	Candidate	Votes	%	±%
Conservative	Ian Taylor	21,882	45.7	−3.3
Liberal Democrats	Mark Marsh	14,155	29.6	+7.1
Labour	Richard C.H. Taylor	9,309	19.4	−4.2
UKIP	Bernard Collignon	1,582	3.3	−1.6
Monster Raving Loony	Chinners Chinnery	608	1.3	N/A
Socialist Labour	Richard G. Cutler	342	0.7	N/A
Majority		7,727	16.1	−9.3
Turnout		47,878	62.2	+0.3
Conservative hold		Swing	−5.2	

General election 2001: Esher and Walton
Party	Candidate	Votes	%	±%
Conservative	Ian Taylor	22,296	49.0	−0.8
Labour	Joe McGowan	10,758	23.6	+0.8
Liberal Democrats	Mark Marsh	10,241	22.5	+2.1
UKIP	Bernard Collignon	2,236	4.9	+3.9
Majority		11,538	25.4	−1.6
Turnout		45,531	61.9	−12.4
Conservative hold		Swing	−0.9	

=== Elections in the 1990s ===
General election 1997: Esher and Walton
Party	Candidate	Votes	%	±%
Conservative	Ian Taylor	26,747	49.8	−10.9
Labour	Julie A. Reay	12,219	22.8	+5.4
Liberal Democrats	Gary M. Miles	10,937	20.4	−1.6
Referendum	Andrew A.C. Cruickshank	2,904	5.4	N/A
UKIP	Bernard Collignon	558	1.0	N/A
Rainbow Dream Ticket	Simone Kay	302	0.6	N/A
Majority		14,528	27.0	
Turnout		53,667	74.3	
Conservative win (new seat)				

== See also ==
- List of parliamentary constituencies in Surrey
- List of parliamentary constituencies in the South East England (region)

== Sources ==
- Election result, 2015 (BBC)
- Election result, 2010 (BBC)
- Election result, 2005 (BBC)
- Election results, 1997–2001 (BBC)
- Election results, 1997–2001 (Election Demon)

Parliament of the United Kingdom
Preceded by South West Surrey	Constituency represented by the foreign secretary 2019–2021	Succeeded by South West Norfolk
