= Dominic Raab =

Deputy Prime Minister of the United Kingdom (2021–2022, 2022–2023)

The Right Honourable Dominic Raab
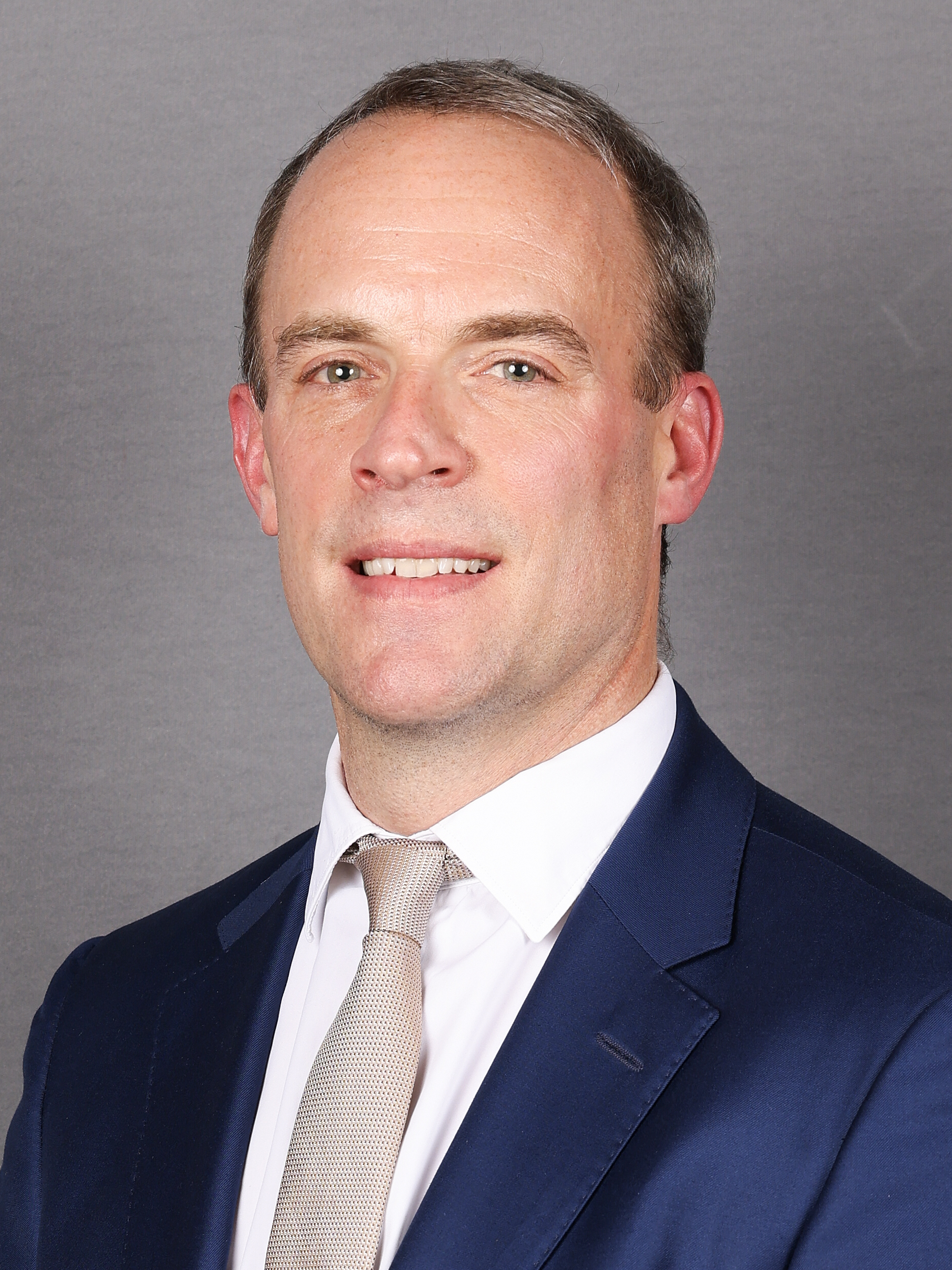
- Official portrait, 2022

Deputy Prime Minister of the United Kingdom
- In office 25 October 2022 – 21 April 2023
- Monarch: Charles III
- Prime Minister: Rishi Sunak
- Preceded by: Thérèse Coffey
- Succeeded by: Oliver Dowden
- In office 15 September 2021 – 6 September 2022
- Monarch: Elizabeth II
- Prime Minister: Boris Johnson
- Preceded by: Nick Clegg (Note: Office vacant between May 2015 and September 2021.)
- Succeeded by: Thérèse Coffey

First Secretary of State
- In office 24 July 2019 – 15 September 2021
- Prime Minister: Boris Johnson
- Preceded by: Damian Green (Note: Office vacant between December 2017 and July 2019.)
- Succeeded by: Louise Haigh (Note: Office vacant between September 2021 and July 2026.)
Cabinet offices 2018–2023
Secretary of State for Justice; Lord Chancellor
In office 15 September 2021 – 6 September 2022
Prime Minister	Boris Johnson
Preceded by	Robert Buckland
Succeeded by	Brandon Lewis
In office 25 October 2022 – 21 April 2023
Prime Minister	Rishi Sunak
Preceded by	Brandon Lewis
Succeeded by	Alex Chalk
Foreign Secretary
In office 24 July 2019 – 15 September 2021
Prime Minister	Boris Johnson
Preceded by	Jeremy Hunt
Succeeded by	Liz Truss
Secretary of State for Exiting the European Union
In office 9 July 2018 – 15 November 2018
Prime Minister	Theresa May
Preceded by	David Davis
Succeeded by	Steve Barclay
Junior ministerial offices 2015–2018
Minister of State for Housing and Planning
In office 9 January 2018 – 9 July 2018
Prime Minister	Theresa May
Preceded by	Alok Sharma
Succeeded by	Kit Malthouse
Minister of State for Courts and Justice
In office 12 June 2017 – 9 January 2018
Prime Minister	Theresa May
Preceded by	Oliver Heald
Succeeded by	Lucy Frazer
Parliamentary Under-Secretary of State for Civil Liberties and Human Rights
In office 12 May 2015 – 16 July 2016
Prime Minister	David Cameron
Preceded by	Simon Hughes
Succeeded by	Phillip Lee

Member of Parliament for Esher and Walton
- In office 6 May 2010 – 30 May 2024
- Preceded by: Ian Taylor
- Succeeded by: Monica Harding

Personal details
- Born: Dominic Rennie Raab; 25 February 1974 (age 52) Buckinghamshire, England
- Party: Conservative
- Spouse: Erika Rey
- Children: 2
- Education: Dr Challoner's Grammar School; Lady Margaret Hall, Oxford (BA); Jesus College, Cambridge (LLM)
- Occupation: Politician; solicitor; civil servant
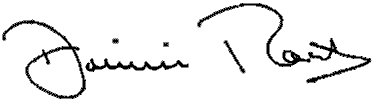
- Signature
- Website: www.dominicraab.com

Dominic Rennie Raab (/rɑːb/ RAHB; born 25 February 1974) is a British politician, businessman and solicitor who served as British Deputy Prime Minister, Justice Secretary and Lord Chancellor from September 2021 to September 2022 and again from October 2022 to April 2023. He previously served as First Secretary of State and Foreign Secretary from 2019 to 2021. A member of the Conservative Party, Raab was Member of Parliament (MP) for Esher and Walton from 2010 to 2024.

Born in Buckinghamshire, Raab attended Dr Challoner's Grammar School. He studied law at Lady Margaret Hall, Oxford and went on to study for a master's degree at Jesus College, Cambridge. He began his career as a solicitor at Linklaters, before working at the Foreign and Commonwealth Office and as a political aide. He was elected for Esher and Walton at the 2010 general election. As a backbencher, Raab co-wrote a number of papers and books, including After the Coalition (2011) and Britannia Unchained (2012). He served as Parliamentary Under-Secretary of State for Justice in the second government of David Cameron from 2015 to 2016. Following Theresa May's appointment as Prime Minister, Raab returned to the backbenches but was appointed to the second May government as Minister of State for Courts and Justice following the 2017 general election. In the 2018 cabinet reshuffle, he was moved to the post of Minister of State for Housing and Planning.

In 2018, Raab was promoted to Secretary of State for Exiting the European Union following the resignation of David Davis. Two weeks later, May announced that she would take control of negotiations with the European Union, with Raab deputising for her and taking charge of domestic preparations for Brexit. Four months later, Raab resigned as Brexit Secretary in opposition to May's draft Brexit withdrawal agreement.

Following May's resignation in 2019, Raab stood to succeed her in the 2019 Conservative Party leadership election; he was eliminated in the second ballot of Conservative MPs. Following Boris Johnson's appointment as Prime Minister, Raab was appointed First Secretary of State and Secretary of State for Foreign and Commonwealth Affairs. In 2020, when the Department for International Development was merged with the Foreign and Commonwealth Office, Raab's post was retitled Secretary of State for Foreign, Commonwealth and Development Affairs. In the 2021 cabinet reshuffle, he was moved to the posts of Deputy Prime Minister, Secretary of State for Justice and Lord Chancellor. Following a stint on the backbenches during the premiership of Liz Truss, he was re-appointed to the posts in Rishi Sunak's ministry. He resigned from Sunak's government in April 2023 after an investigation upheld some complaints that he had bullied civil servants. Raab was critical of the investigation's findings and said that the threshold for bullying had been set too low. He did not seek re-election as an MP at the 2024 general election.

In December 2024, it was announced that Raab had been appointed as a senior consultant at PLB, a marketing agency based in High Wycombe.

== Early life and education ==
Dominic Rennie Raab was born on 25 February 1974 in Buckinghamshire. He is the son of Jean, a clothes buyer, and Peter, a food manager for Marks & Spencer. His father, who was Jewish, was born in Czechoslovakia and fled the Nazis with his family in 1938 at age six. The family arrived in Britain in 1940, having spent some time in a refugee camp in Tangiers. Raab was brought up in the Church of England, his mother's faith. He grew up in Gerrards Cross, Buckinghamshire. Raab was 12 years old when his father died of cancer.

Raab attended Dr Challoner's Grammar School, Amersham, and spent a brief period as a volunteer on a kibbutz before studying law at Lady Margaret Hall, Oxford, where he captained the university karate team. He then studied for a Master of Laws degree at Jesus College, Cambridge, where he won the Clive Parry Prize for International Law.

== Early career ==
After graduating from Cambridge, Raab trained professionally at the City of London law firm Linklaters, completing his two-year training contract there. At Linklaters, Raab worked on project finance, international litigation and competition law. This included time on secondments at Liberty (the human rights NGO) and in Brussels advising on EU and WTO law. Raab left the firm in 2000, shortly after qualifying as a solicitor.

Raab worked for six years professionally as a solicitor after qualifying, in both commercial work and civil service positions for the government in the Foreign Office, before leaving the legal profession to pursue politics in 2006.

During his time as a lawyer in the Civil Service under the Labour Government until 2006, Raab's briefs included leading a team at the British Embassy in The Hague, dedicated to bringing war criminals to justice in a position closely linked to Tony Blair. After returning to London, he advised on the Arab–Israeli conflict, the European Union and Gibraltar. He defended Tony Blair against a subpoena from former Yugoslav President Slobodan Milošević.

On moving from the legal profession to politics in 2006, Raab's first political roles as part of the Conservative Party were as an aide to MP David Davis, and then to Dominic Grieve. When Raab was appointed Justice Secretary in 2021 he was described within the legal press as an "ex-rookie" solicitor of a major law firm.

== Parliamentary career ==
=== Member of Parliament ===
Raab was elected to Parliament at the 2010 general election as MP for Esher and Walton with a vote share of 58.9% and a majority of 18,593.

In July 2010, Raab criticised the government for opting into the EU directive on the European Investigation Order, arguing it would strain operational policing resources, and would dilute safeguards protecting British citizens from misuse of personal data and guaranteeing a fair trial.

Raab came to media attention in August 2010, after requesting that the pressure group 38 Degrees remove his parliamentary email address from their website, arguing that lobby groups sending or coordinating 'clone emails' designed to deluge MPs' inboxes detracted from their ability to correspond with constituents and help those in real need. 38 Degrees said that the email address is paid for by taxpayers' money and is in the public domain, thus they have every right to host it on their website and use it for campaigning.

In April 2011, he presented an ultimately unsuccessful Ten Minute Rule Bill proposing that emergency services and transport unions should be required by law to ensure that strike votes receive 50% support of union members. Raab argued that reform was needed to prevent "militant union bosses" holding the "hard working majority" to ransom.

In January 2012, Raab spoke in support of the coalition government's plans to cut the budget deficit, expand academy schools, repeal the Identity Cards Act 2006, and enact a Freedom Bill.

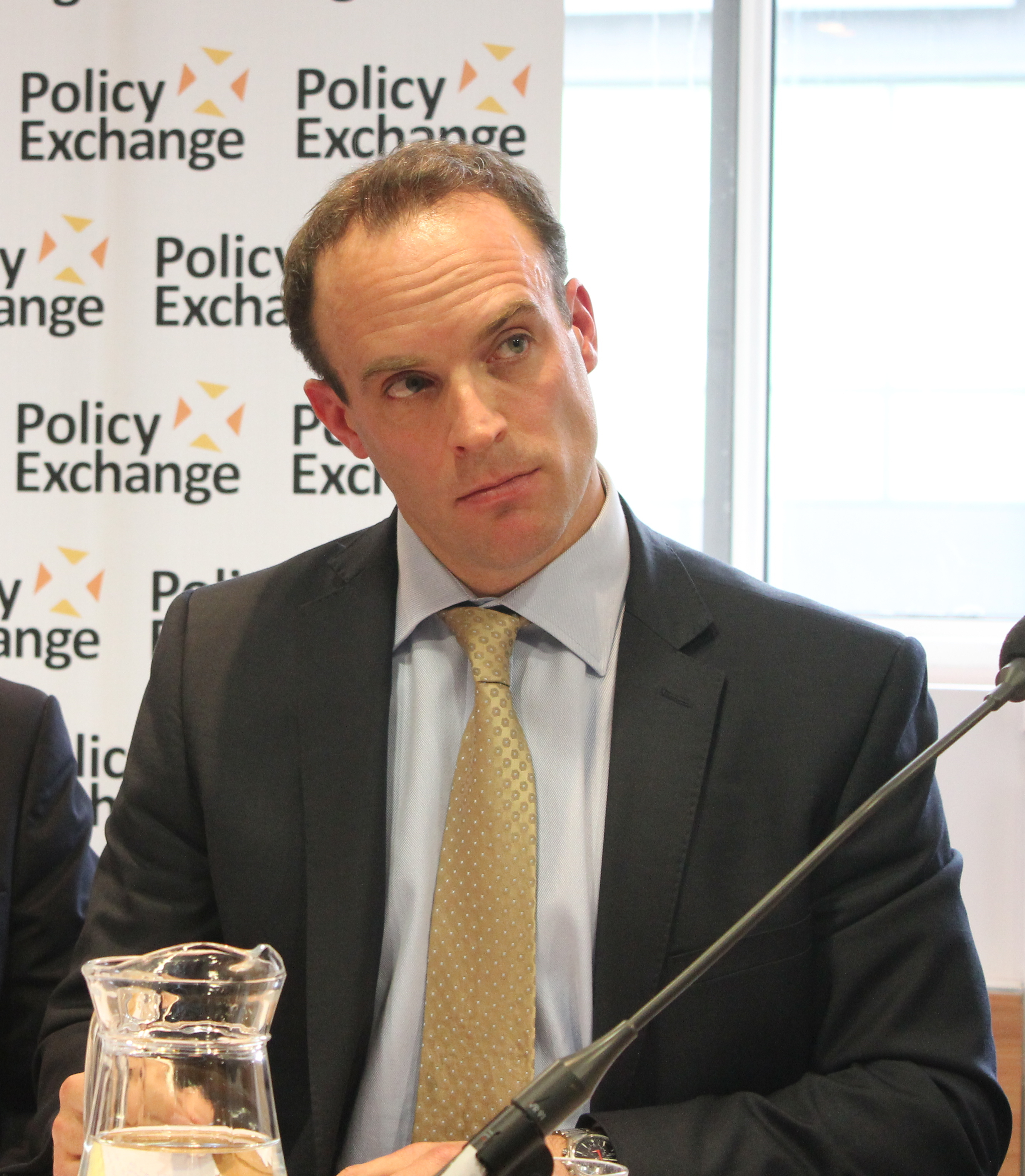
Raab at the 2012 Policy Exchange

On 7 March 2012, Raab opened a debate in the House of Commons on Sergei Magnitsky and Impunity for Gross Human Rights Abuses, calling on the UK government to bring forward legislative proposals that would allow it to impose visa bans and asset freezes on state officials responsible for gross human rights abuses against individuals. The motion was supported by three former Foreign Secretaries and two former Foreign Ministers and had cross-party support and was passed unanimously by MPs.

On 30 January 2014, Raab proposed an amendment to the Immigration Bill to deport all prisoners given a sentence of a year or more. It was defeated, but allowed 99 members to voice that change was necessary to prevent immigrants convicted of crimes from using the ECHR as support to remain in the UK.

At the 2015 general election, Raab was re-elected as MP for Esher and Walton with an increased vote share of 62.9% and an increased majority of 28,616. After the election, he was appointed Parliamentary Under-Secretary of State at the Ministry of Justice under Michael Gove, with responsibility for human rights questions. In September 2015, in this capacity, he addressed representatives of the 46 other member states of the Council of Europe on the question of the UK's blanket ban on prisoner voting.

Since being elected Raab has campaigned for fairer funding for local services in Elmbridge, stronger local democracy in the running of community hospitals in Cobham, Walton and Molesey, more visible and responsive policing, and against the construction of an M25 service station at Downside.

At the snap 2017 general election, Raab was again re-elected, with a decreased vote share of 58.6% and a decreased majority of 23,298.

In February 2018, Raab advertised for an unpaid intern just ahead of a Department for Business, Energy and Industrial Strategy (BEIS) publication responding to the Taylor review on insecure work. The BEIS report criticised "exploitative unpaid internships", saying "an employer cannot avoid paying someone the minimum wage simply by calling them an 'intern' or saying that they are doing an internship."

In the 2018 cabinet reshuffle Raab was appointed Minister of State for Housing and Planning.

Raab was again re-elected at the 2019 general election with a decreased vote share of 49.4% and a decreased majority of 2,743.

=== Libel case ===
In August 2007, while Raab was working in the office of David Davis MP, he signed a compromise agreement with Davis and a female employee who was intending to bring an employment tribunal claim. The agreement contained a confidentiality clause. In January 2011, The Mail on Sunday published an article about the case and Raab subsequently sued the newspaper for libel, arguing that the article insinuated that he had "bullied and sexually discriminated against" the young woman causing her "to become traumatised, to feel worthless and to leave a job which she had otherwise enjoyed", and that the £20,000 she had been paid as part of the compromise agreement was "hush money to keep [his] appalling behaviour secret". Raab refused to release the woman from the confidentiality clause of the compromise agreement, leaving the newspaper hampered in mounting a defence, and the court refused to strike out the libel claim or order the disclosure of a witness statement made by the woman. The newspaper settled out of court with Raab, paying him a five-figure sum and printing a retraction and apology in March 2012.

=== EU referendum campaign ===
Raab was an active campaigner in the 2016 EU membership referendum, advocating that Britain should leave the European Union. He said in an interview that it would be better for the British economy to leave: "We'll be better off if we're freed up to trade more energetically with the growth markets like Latin America and Asia. I think it will be good for job creation and also cut prices in the stores." He also argued that there was too much waste and corruption in the EU. During the Brexit campaign, Raab repeatedly argued that there was no doubt that the UK would get a trade deal with the EU.

=== Westminster dossier ===
In late October 2017, a dossier listing allegations of a mainly sexual nature against several dozen Conservative MPs made internally by party researchers was circulated at Westminster and amongst journalists. Raab wrote on his website at the beginning of November that his entry made a false accusation of an "Injunction for inappropriate behaviour with a woman". He commented: "I have never been served with any injunction for anything. Nor have I ever sought one". It was "false and malicious" to make "any insinuation that I have engaged in anything resembling sexual harassment, sexually abusive behaviour or lewd remarks". He believed the dossier itself was a "form of harassment and intimidation". Raab said he was taking legal advice.

=== Impact of immigration on the housing market ===
In April 2018, as Minister of State for Housing and Planning Raab said in an interview that immigration had "put house prices up by something like 20%" over the past 25 years. The UK Statistics Authority asked Raab to publish the evidence for his claim. A document published by the Ministry of Housing, Communities and Local Government shows that the finding was based on an out-of-date model that had never been intended for this kind of analysis. Raab defended the model and said: "I did indeed say care was needed with the data, and I was right that immigration put average prices up by 20%. We need a balanced approach."

=== Brexit Secretary ===
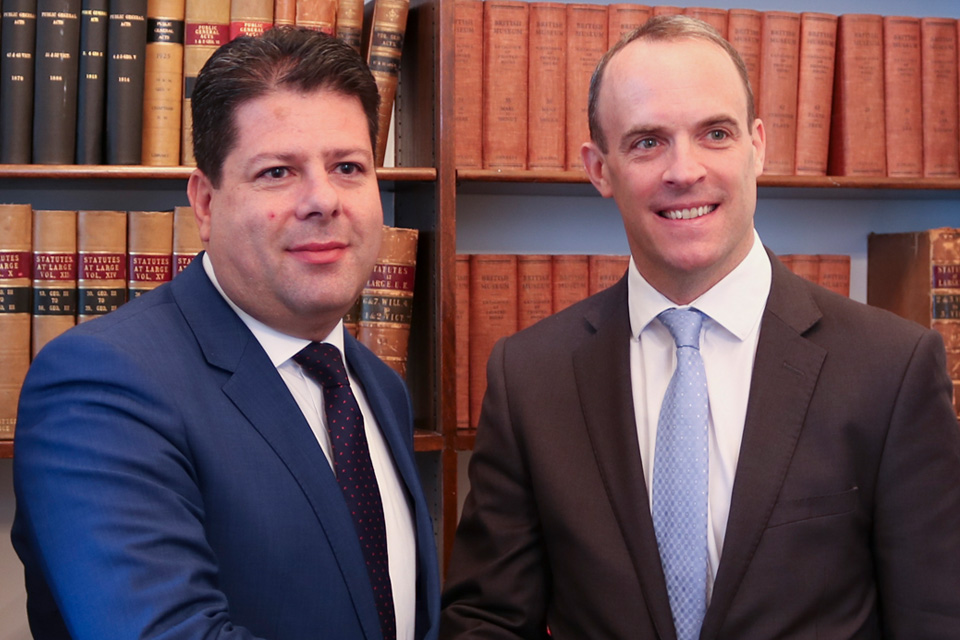
Raab meets with Fabian Picardo, the Chief Minister of Gibraltar, in September 2018

On 9 July 2018, following the resignation of David Davis, Raab was appointed Secretary of State for Exiting the European Union. Two weeks later, May announced that she would take control of negotiations with the European Union, while Raab would deputise for her and oversee domestic preparations for Brexit.

In November 2018, Raab was criticised by Labour's shadow Brexit minister, Jenny Chapman, after Raab said that he "hadn't quite understood the full extent" of how much UK trade relies on the Dover–Calais crossing.

On 15 November 2018, Raab announced his resignation as Brexit Secretary, citing his disapproval over the Cabinet position on the draft Brexit withdrawal agreement. According to a BBC News report, Raab was concerned with "two major and fatal flaws" in the draft agreement, namely that the proposed terms "threaten the integrity of the United Kingdom" and that "they would lead to an indefinite if not permanent situation where the UK is locked into a regime with no say over the rules being applied, with no exit mechanism", flaws which would prove "damaging for the economy but devastating for public trust in our democracy". While subsequently describing May's deal as worse than remaining in the EU, he voted in favour of it at the occasion of the third vote on the withdrawal agreement on 29 March 2019. He described the Irish backstop as "undemocratic and [...] something that will have to be removed."

Following his resignation, Raab defended the position that the UK should not pay the so-called Brexit divorce bill (amounting to around £39 billion) in the event of a no-deal Brexit. This bill reflects commitments which the UK entered into for the EU's Multiannual Financial Framework for the years 2014–2020 and so according to some interpretations is not linked to Britain's exit from the European Union. The House of Lords alternatively found that the UK would not be liable for such payments.

In June 2019, unnamed EU sources claimed that Raab had been nicknamed "The Turnip" in Brussels, a play on raap, the Dutch word for the vegetable, suggesting EU dissatisfaction with his negotiation strategy.

=== 2019 Conservative Party leadership election ===
On 25 May 2019, Raab announced he was standing in the Conservative leadership election after Theresa May announced her resignation. In the second round of voting, on 18 June, Raab failed to obtain the required minimum number of 33 votes, winning 30 and finishing in sixth place, behind Sajid Javid. After being eliminated, he endorsed the frontrunner Boris Johnson, who subsequently won the contest.

=== First Secretary of State and Foreign Secretary ===
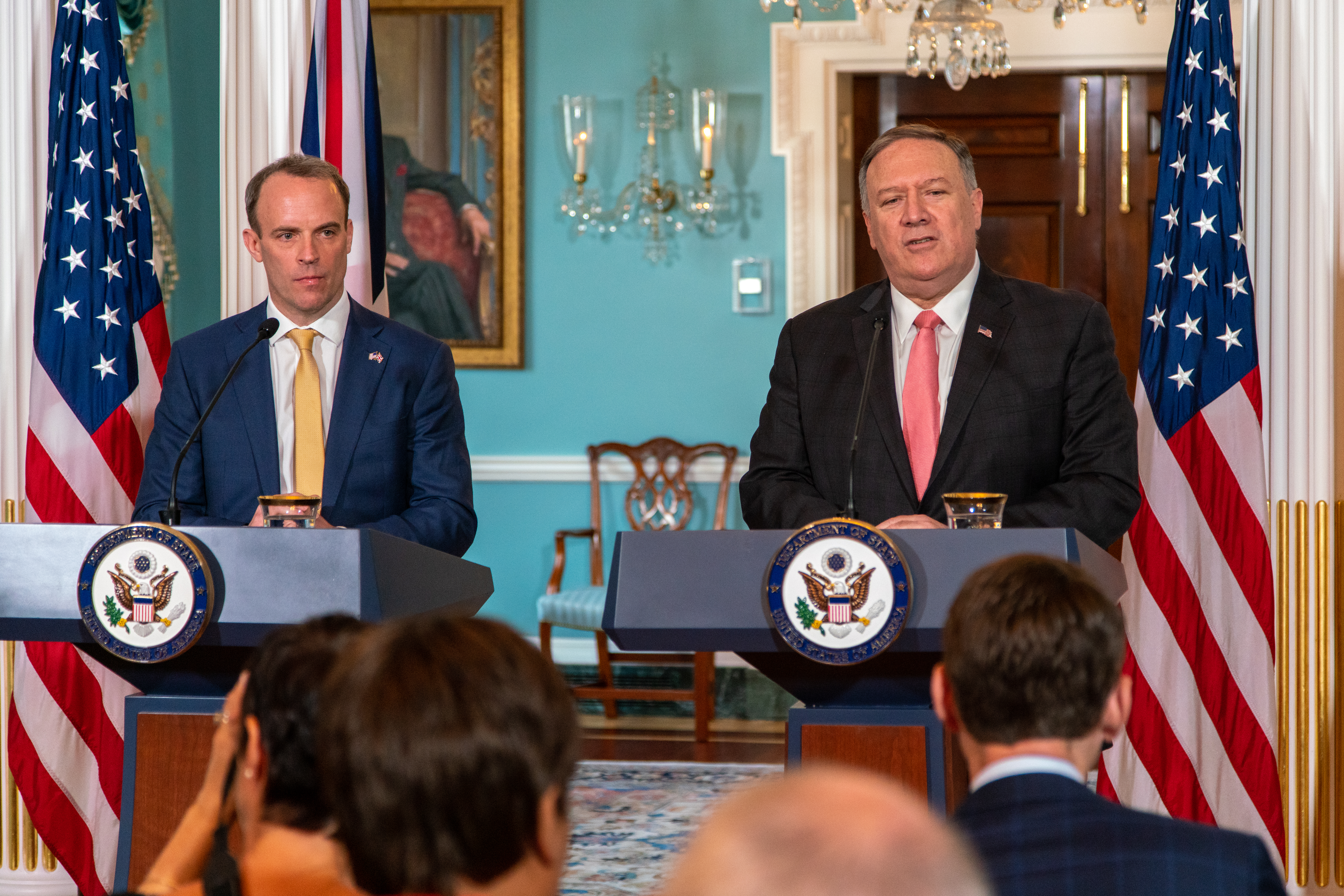
Raab with US Secretary of State Mike Pompeo in Washington, D.C., August 2019

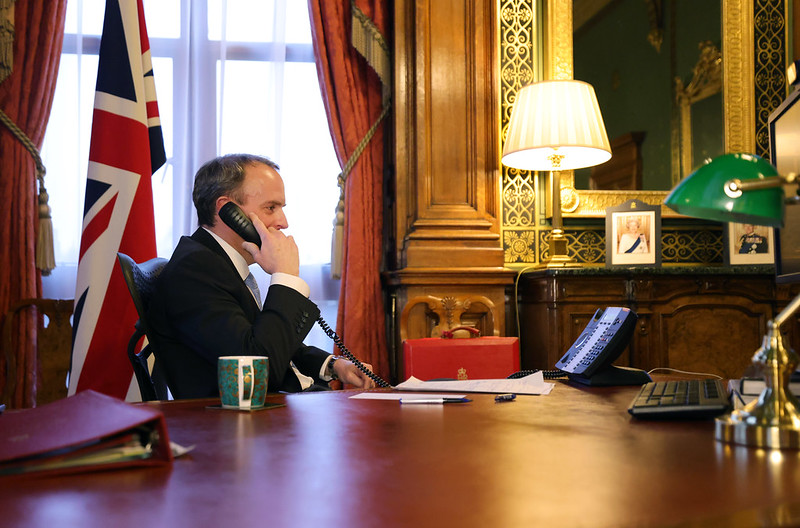
Raab speaks with newly sworn in US Secretary of State Antony Blinken in January 2021

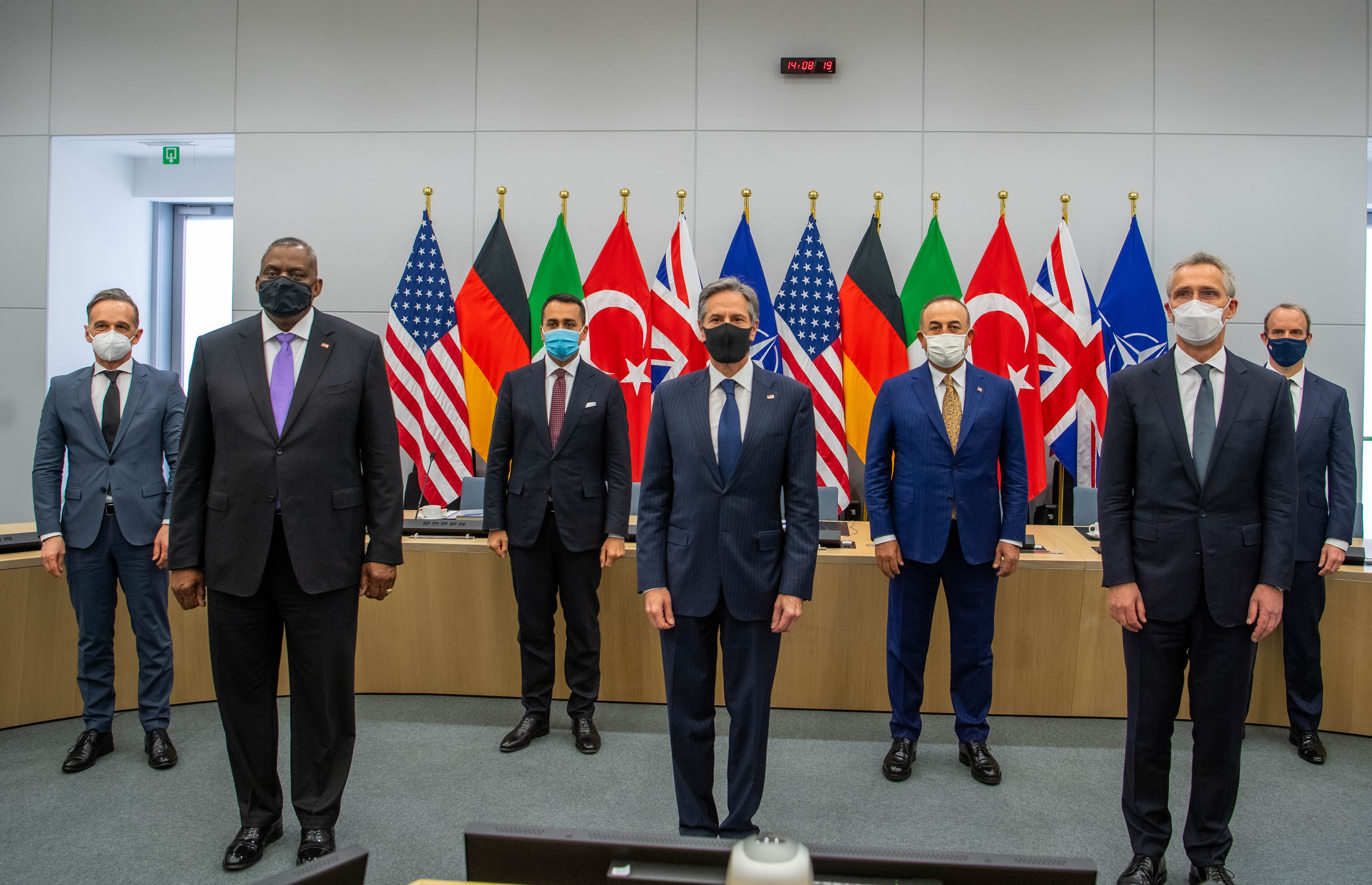
Raab at NATO headquarters in Brussels in April 2021

On 24 July 2019, Boris Johnson appointed Raab Foreign Secretary, succeeding Jeremy Hunt, and handed him the additional title First Secretary of State. On arrival at the Foreign Office, Raab said: "I'm hugely humbled to take on this role at this time and excited about the opportunities that lie ahead."

In 2019, the International Court of Justice in The Hague ruled that the United Kingdom must transfer the Chagos Archipelago to Mauritius as they were not legally separated from the latter in 1965. In its statement rejecting the ruling, the Foreign Office said: "The United Kingdom has no doubt about its sovereignty over the Chagos Archipelago, which has been under continuous British sovereignty since 1814." The shadow foreign secretary, Lisa Nandy, in a letter to Raab said the UK position "is damaging to Britain's reputation, undermines your credibility and moral authority".

Raab stood in for Johnson at Prime Minister's Questions on 2 October 2019, as First Secretary of State.

On 3 January 2020, the high-level Iranian General Qasem Soleimani was assassinated by the United States, which considerably heightened the existing tensions between the two countries. Raab backed the strike, describing the American action as self-defence. He said that his government had "always recognised the aggressive threat posed by the Iranian Quds force".

Raab supported Johnson's decision to allow China's Huawei to build part of UK's 5G network despite US and Australian opposition.

On 23 March, during the coronavirus pandemic, the government confirmed that Raab, as First Secretary of State, was to deputise for Johnson if he became "incapacitated" due to COVID-19. On 6 April, after Johnson was admitted to an intensive care unit due to his illness with COVID-19, Raab was asked to deputise for Johnson. In April 2020, Raab was questioned in the first two sessions of virtual Prime Minister's Questions by new Labour Leader Keir Starmer.

In April 2020, Raab warned that the UK cannot go back to "business as usual" with China after the end of the COVID-19 pandemic.

On 16 June, it was announced by the Prime Minister that Raab would absorb the responsibilities of the Secretary of State for International Development in September 2020 upon the formation of a joint department called the Foreign, Commonwealth and Development Office. His brief changed to Secretary of State for Foreign, Commonwealth and Development Affairs on 2 September, and he said that the UK would continue to spend 0.7% of its national income on foreign aid.

After the 30 June 2020 imposition by the Xi Jinping regime of the national security law in Hong Kong, Raab described the following day in the Commons what he saw as a "grave and deeply disturbing" event, dissected the affront to the Sino-British Joint Declaration in the Commons, and announced a new chapter in Hong Kong–United Kingdom relations with substantial changes to the idea of British National (Overseas) permits. Raab did not rule out boycotting the 2022 Winter Olympics over the treatment of the Uyghur Muslims by the Chinese government.

Raab welcomed the peace agreement between Israel and the United Arab Emirates, saying he was gladdened by suspension of Israel's plans to annex parts of the occupied Palestinian territories in the West Bank. Raab also welcomed the normalization of relations between Israel and Sudan, saying that it is "a positive step between two valued friends."

In March 2020, Raab visited the mausoleum of the Turkish leader Mustafa Kemal Atatürk and called Turkey a "staunch ally in NATO and one of its largest contributors of military personnel." Raab said, "The UK stands with Turkey in the fight against terrorism, and recognises the serious threat posed" by the Kurdish separatist movement PKK. On 6 October, Raab warned that the result of the 2020 Nagorno-Karabakh conflict between Armenia and Azerbaijan may be the strengthening of relations between Russia and Turkey, saying that a "battle for geopolitical stances is in progress. I believe that even though the behavior of our Turkish partners in NATO is sometimes disappointing, we need to be very careful with the risk that Turkey is falling into Russia's arms."

On 10 May 2021, Raab condemned rocket attacks on Israel and called for "immediate de-escalation on all sides" and an "end to targeting of civilian populations".

On 15 August 2021, as the Taliban militant group once again controlled a vast majority of Afghan territory, the Taliban began capturing the capital city of Kabul. Raab was abroad on holiday when Kabul fell to the Taliban. He returned to the UK on 16 August and said the UK government was surprised by the "scale and pace" of the Taliban's takeover of Afghanistan. Defence secretary Ben Wallace admitted all remaining UK nationals and Afghan allies might not get away and said "Some people won't get back". Unnamed sources told The Guardian Raab refused to talk to some Foreign Office staff and this allegedly caused problems during the Afghanistan evacuation. Raab denies the claims. The Foreign Affairs Select Committee said the government was "missing in action" after examining the episode. Unnamed insiders told The Guardian in November 2022 that Raab limited the number of senior staff he dealt with. Unnamed sources said "Decisions that should have taken hours took days or simply did not happen." Raab allegedly avoided communicating with "those he found to be challenging voices".

On 20 August 2021, Labour MP Kevin Brennan accused Rabb of hypocrisy by refusing to be contacted and remaining on holiday in Crete while Kabul fell to the Taliban, despite having previously co-authored the book Britannia Unchained which criticized British workers by calling them the "worst idlers in the world".

=== Deputy Prime Minister and Justice Secretary ===
==== First term (2021–2022) ====
In a cabinet reshuffle on 15 September 2021, Raab was appointed Secretary of State for Justice and Lord Chancellor. He was also given the title of Deputy Prime Minister, a post unused since the Cameron–Clegg coalition.

Raab declined to run in the July–September 2022 Conservative Party leadership election. He endorsed Sunak's leadership bid.

In August 2022, Raab moved to block the release of the parents of now seven-year-old Tony Hudgell, who had been abused by them and had to have his legs amputated.

The Guardian reported in December 2022 that Raab prevented the victims' commissioner for England and Wales being reappointed and is not expected to replace her for months. According to victims' groups, critical legislation was going through parliament without an independent reviewer. Unnamed sources stated Raab intervened to stop Vera Baird staying as victims' commissioner.

==== Second term (2022–2023) ====
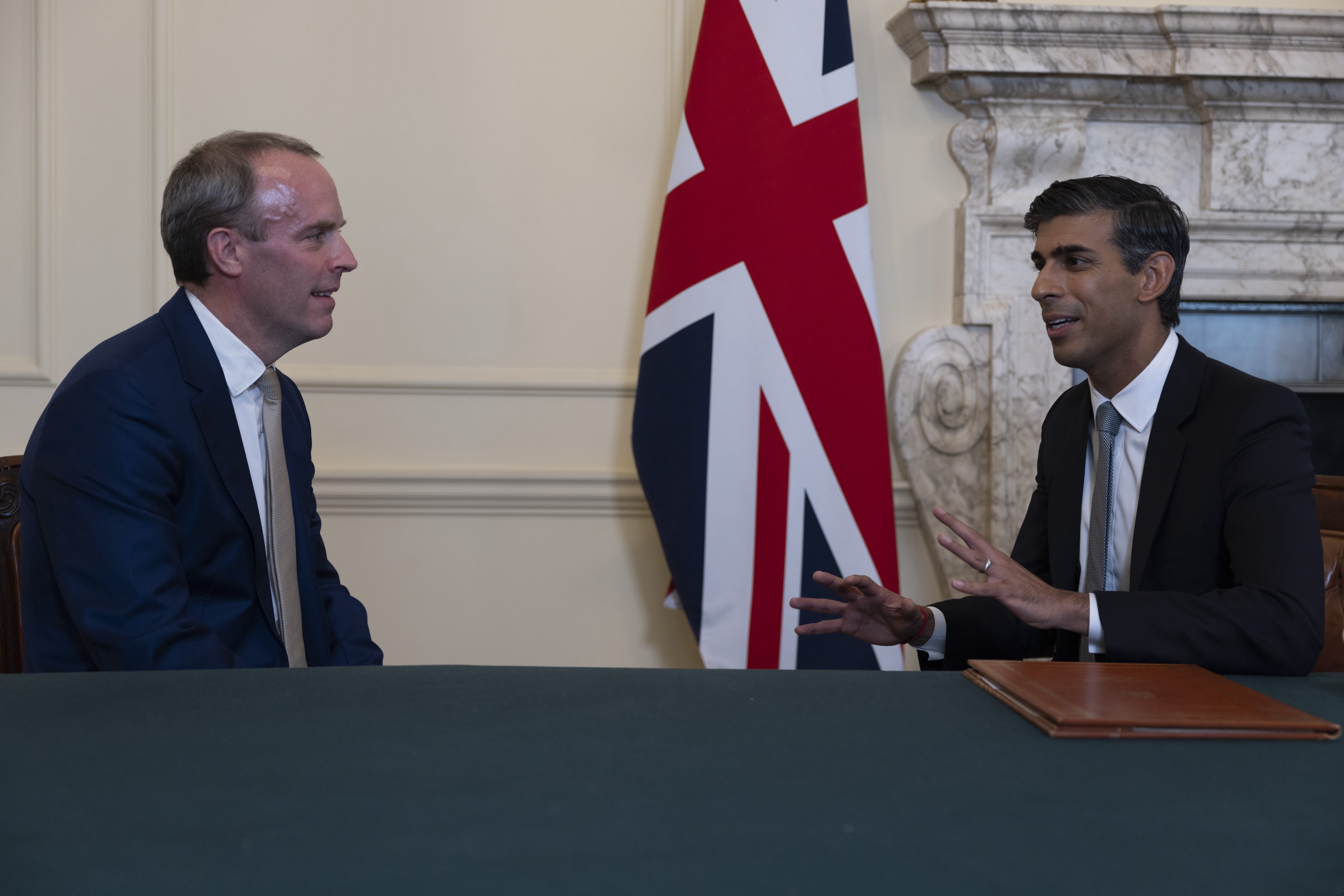
Raab meeting with Prime Minister Rishi Sunak after his appointment as Deputy Prime Minister, Lord Chancellor and Justice Secretary on 25 October 2022.

Raab was reappointed by Sunak as Deputy Prime Minister, Justice Secretary and Lord Chancellor on 25 October 2022. In November 2022, Raab said that terrorist offenders would face longer sentences if they committed crime, such as vandalising cells, while in prison.

Raab resigned as both Deputy Prime Minister and Justice Secretary on 21 April 2023, after an independent investigation found that his behaviour towards civil servants at the Ministry of Justice and at the Foreign, Commonwealth and Development Office had amounted to bullying in two cases. The report of the investigation was published on the same day.

=== Bullying investigation and resignation ===
On 15 November 2022, two formal bullying complaints were made by civil servants about Raab's behaviour when Justice Secretary and Foreign Secretary in Boris Johnson's government. Allegations against Raab included claims that he lost his temper at work and left staff scared to enter his office and that his behaviour was "abrasive and controlling". After Raab had been notified about the two formal complaints, he asked Sunak to commission an independent investigation, saying that he would "thoroughly rebut and refute" the claims against him, that he had "never tolerated bullying" and was confident that he had "behaved professionally throughout". Adam Tolley KC was appointed to undertake the investigation, while the responsibility to decide whether Raab had breached the ministerial code of conduct would remain with Sunak. During an interview on Sky News in February 2023, Raab said he would resign if the investigation found that he had bullied civil servants.

The story of bullying allegations against Raab, which eventually led to the investigation and his resignation, had broken on 11 November 2022 when The Guardian newspaper reported that senior civil servants in the Ministry of Justice were offered "respite or a route out" of the department after Raab was reappointed, as they had been affected by his behaviour, described as "bullying and unprofessional", during his previous tenure. The Permanent Secretary at the Ministry of Justice, Antonia Romeo, had had to ask Raab to treat staff professionally and with respect on his return. The following days brought further media coverage of allegations of bullying: The Sun suggested that Raab had once thrown tomatoes from a salad across a room in a fit of anger, a claim Raab's spokesman dismissed as nonsense, while The Mirror reported that he "burns through" staff.

The former Permanent Secretary at the Foreign Office, Lord McDonald was interviewed on LBC Radio and said that he had spoken to Raab on several occasions about the way he treated staff. A report in The Times said that civil servants at the Ministry of Justice had been "signed off work for extended periods of time" when Raab was Justice Secretary and that a complaint had been made about him in March 2022, with reference to a "dysfunctional working culture" that had begun to hinder effective work in the department. Raab denied the allegations with a spokesman saying "He consistently holds himself to the highest standards of professionalism and has never received nor been made aware of any formal complaint against him".

Initially the terms of reference of the bullying investigation included just the two formal complaints made on 15 November but they were expanded as more complaints were made between 23 November and 13 December and eventually included eight formal complaints, six dating from Raab's time at the Ministry of Justice, one from his time as Foreign Secretary and one from his time as Brexit Secretary. The eight complaints involved 24 civil servants. Tolly conducted 66 interviews including four with Raab, who also made written representations to the investigation.

The report, which was handed to Sunak on 20 April 2023, found that on occasion, both at the Ministry of Justice and at the Foreign Office, Raab's conduct towards civil servants had crossed the threshold between abrasive and bullying. Raab's style was, in his own words, "inquisitorial, direct, impatient and fastidious", but the report found that he did not shout or swear at people, and did not refer to them as "snowflakes". Both the Permanent Secretary at the Ministry of Justice, Antonia Romeo, and the Permanent Under-Secretary at the Foreign Office, Sir Philip Barton, had previously spoken to him about his behaviour, although not using the term "bullying", but their advice had not had any impact. It was only after the investigation was announced, that Raab modified his abrasive style.

The report found that Raab had been aggressive at a meeting at the Foreign Office and his conduct had involved misuse of power to undermine and humiliate. No finding on the original Ministry of Justice group complaint was made, as it had been signed by a number of people, not all of whom had had direct contact with Raab. Regarding the additional Ministry of Justice complaints, the report found that on occasion during meetings with policy officials, Raab's behaviour had been intimidating and insulting. As far as the Brexit Office complaint was concerned, the report found that Raab's behaviour was intimidating but not offensive, malicious or insulting and so did not meet the threshold for bullying. Tolley found that all complainants acted in good faith and had no ulterior agenda.

It was up to the Prime Minister to decide whether or not Raab's conduct breached the ministerial code, which states that: "Harassing, bullying or other inappropriate or discriminating behaviour wherever it takes place is not consistent with the Ministerial Code and will not be tolerated" Raab however had previously said he would resign if the investigation found that he had bullied civil servants and so he did not wait for Sunak's decision but submitted his resignation as Minister of Justice and Deputy Prime Minister on 21 April 2023, the day after the report was handed to Sunak. In his resignation letter Raab was critical of the investigation, saying that the adverse findings were flawed and that the threshold for bullying had been set too low. He also complained that there had been "skewed and fabricated claims" leaked to the media during the investigation. One leak was reported by The Telegraph in March 2023, which said that former Prime Minister Johnson had privately warned Raab about his conduct and given evidence to the investigation. Johnson's warning was not mentioned in the report, which said that there had been "a series of inaccurate and misleading media reports about the investigation".

A month after resigning as a minister, Raab announced that he would not seek re-election as an MP at the 2024 general election.

The accounts of the Ministry of Justice for the year 2023–2024 show that Raab received a severance payment of £16,876 as a result of his resignation from the office of justice secretary. This was in accordance with the rules on payouts for ministers who leave their jobs.

== Political positions ==
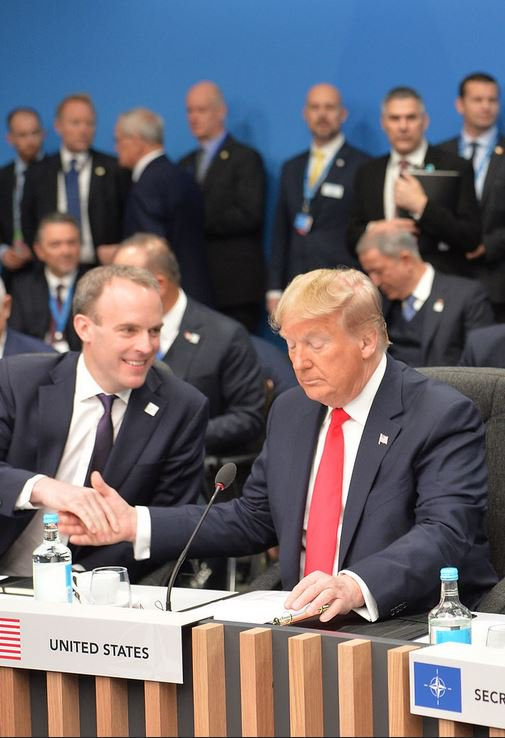
Raab and Donald Trump at the 2019 NATO Summit

=== Human Rights Act ===
In 2009, prior to becoming an MP, Raab said he did not support the Human Rights Act, stating that "The very enactment of the Human Rights Act has served as a trigger for the formulation of claims by lawyers and judicial reasoning by courts, using human rights arguments that would never have been dared before. The spread of rights has become contagious and, since the Human Rights Act, opened the door to vast new categories of claims, which can be judicially enforced against the government through the courts."

=== Positive discrimination ===
In July 2010, he secured a review of positive discrimination rules being applied to Foreign and Commonwealth Office work experience schemes, having been contacted by a constituent who had been rejected from the scheme for failing to meet "the social criteria". The two programmes at the organisation barred white males from applying, other than those from low-income backgrounds; Raab argued they re-introduced discrimination 'via the backdoor'. The MP welcomed the review, blaming the situation on the previous Labour government. He stated "positive discrimination is wrong in the same way as negative discrimination. It means people are thinking in terms of social criteria and it is anti-meritocratic."

=== Prisoners' rights ===
On 10 February 2011, Raab gave the winding-up speech in the debate on whether to give prisoners the vote, arguing that freedom entails responsibility and that elected lawmakers in the House of Commons rather than "unaccountable" judges in Strasbourg should decide the matter.

On 22 June 2011, the Joint Committee on Human Rights (JCHR) published a report on The Human Rights Implications of British extradition. As a member of the JCHR, Raab proposed that the committee look into the issue of fast-track extradition of British citizens following several instances of miscarriages of justice. In an article for The Times, Raab argued that more needed to be done to protect British citizens subject to European Arrest Warrants. The JCHR has called for safeguards to ensure warrants are not issued for minor offences and when there is minimal evidence, and for checks to prevent extradition for investigation rather than prosecution. On 24 November 2011, Raab led a debate in the House of Commons calling for extradition reform. His motion had cross-party support, and was backed by Gary McKinnon's mother, Janis Sharpe.

=== Palestinian state ===
In September 2011, Raab wrote that "Peace must precede Palestinian statehood", and criticised the Israeli settlements as undermining "the prospects for a continuous Palestinian state."

In August 2020, in his capacity of Foreign Secretary, Raab visited Israel and the West Bank to "press for renewed dialogue" between the two sides.

=== The Miller case ===
On 3 November 2016, and in response to the decision of the High Court in R (Miller) v Secretary of State for Exiting the European Union on whether the government was entitled to notify an intention to leave the European Union under Article 50 of the Treaty on European Union without a vote in Parliament, Raab stated that in the 2016 EU membership referendum "the British people gave a clear mandate for the UK Government to leave the EU and take back control of our borders, laws, money and trade. It is disappointing that today the court has chosen to ignore their decision". He went on to state that the decision was "a plain attempt to block Brexit by people who are out of touch with the country and refuse to accept the result. However, the vote to leave the EU was clear and they should not seek to obstruct it".

=== Saudi Arabia ===
In October 2018, Raab told BBC One's The Andrew Marr Show that the assassination of Jamal Khashoggi was a "terrible case" but the UK government was "not throwing our hands in the air and terminating the relationship with Saudi Arabia, not just because of the huge number of British jobs that depend on it but also because if you exert influence over your partners you need to be able to talk to them... The problem with Labour's position is it would cost thousands of British jobs."

== Writings ==
=== Civil liberties and justice ===
In 2009, Raab published his first book, The Assault on Liberty – What Went Wrong with Rights. In October 2010, he published Fight Terror, Defend Freedom, a pamphlet on the Home Office counter-terrorism review.

In January 2011, Raab wrote an article on the use of control orders in counter-terrorism cases in which he contended that they are ineffective and should be scrapped with a greater focus on prosecutions.

In April 2011 Raab published a pamphlet with the think tank Civitas entitled Strasbourg in the Dock. The pamphlet followed Parliament's recent rejection of a European Court of Human Rights ruling (the Hirst case) that at least some prisoners should have the right to vote. Raab argued that judges had overstepped the mark in relation to the case because they were not elected. The Strasbourg judges are elected by the 324 members of the Parliamentary Assembly of the Council of Europe; members are drawn from the national parliaments of the Council of Europe's member states. Raab contended that many of the judges were lacking experience and as a result "are undermining the credibility and value of the Court". Raab made a range of proposals to strengthen the authority of Britain's Supreme Court, give elected lawmakers the last word on the creation of new rights, and reform the Strasbourg Court.

In July 2011, Raab called for reform of the UK Borders Act 2007, which allows foreign criminals to avoid deportation by claiming a "right to family life" under Article 8 of the European Convention on Human Rights. He proposed that the reference to the Human Rights Act be removed. He argued this could be done in a way that ensures foreign criminals could avoid deportation only if there is a "serious risk" they will be tortured on their return.

=== Equality, meritocracy, and positive discrimination ===
On 30 January 2011, he wrote a comment piece for The Sunday Times on implementation of the Equality Act 2010. Raab argued for a meritocratic approach against positive discrimination and highlighted the lower standard of human rights protections in extradition cases compared with deportation cases.

In an article in January 2011 on the Politics Home website, Raab argued in favour of transferable paternity leave and against "the equality bandwagon ... pitting men and women against each other". He argued in favour of a consistent approach to sexism against men and women commenting that some feminists were "now amongst the most obnoxious bigots" and it was sexist to blame men for the recession.

Raab highlighted the wide range of sex discrimination he said was faced by males including "anti-male discrimination in rights of maternity/paternity leave", young boys being "educationally disadvantaged compared to girls", and how "divorced or separated fathers are systematically ignored by the courts". Raab stated "from the cradle to the grave, men are getting a raw deal. Men work longer hours, die earlier, but retire later than women", noting that the pensions inequalities were still not going to be rectified for another seven years.

He was subsequently interviewed on the piece by the London Evening Standard, as well as BBC Radio 4. Theresa May, who was Minister for Women and Equalities at the time, criticised Raab's "obnoxious bigots" comment but agreed with his suggestions on paternity leave and ending gender warfare. Her remarks took place during a debate on employment law in the House of Commons.

Raab's remarks were criticised by some Labour MPs, including Harriet Harman and Nia Griffith, who said Raab should "stop being so self-pitying. The reality is that women with very good qualifications time and time again do not get the top jobs and opportunities." Raab stood by his comments in a comment piece for The Daily Telegraph, highlighting the various statements Harman had made about men, contrasting them with similar comments about women by the likes of Andy Gray. Raab also stated he had received an "overwhelmingly positive" reaction to his comments "from both men and women".

In July 2012, Raab published a pamphlet with the Centre for Policy Studies entitled Unleashing the British Underdog: 10 Bets on the Little Guy. In the report, Raab outlines 10 policies to improve social mobility and provide opportunities for those from non-traditional backgrounds to succeed.

=== After the Coalition ===
In October 2011, Dominic Raab and four other MPs of the 2010 intake published After the Coalition, an argument that Conservative principles adapted to the modern world would be essential for the future national success of the party. The book was serialised in The Daily Telegraph. Raab wrote his piece for the paper on British foreign policy, arguing it should reflect the national interest: Britain should not overextend itself in foreign conflicts, aid should be focused on the poorest countries and Britain should champion free trade abroad.

=== Regulation ===
In November 2011, Raab wrote a pamphlet published by the Centre for Policy Studies, Escaping the Strait Jacket – Ten Regulatory Reforms to Create Jobs. The paper makes the case for reforming red tape to boost job creation on grounds of economic competitiveness and social fairness.

=== Britannia Unchained ===
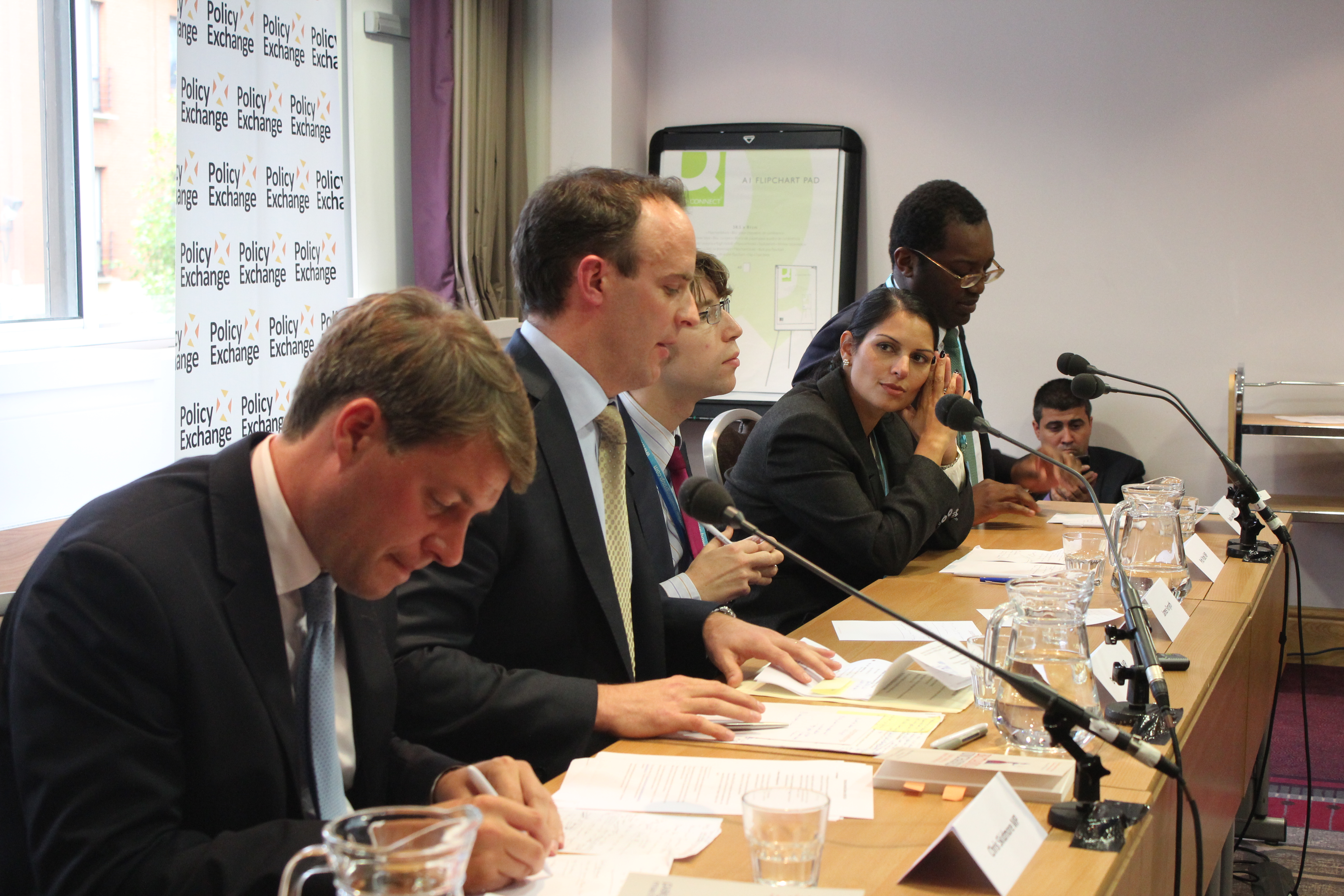
From left to right: Chris Skidmore, Raab, James Forsyth, Priti Patel and Kwasi Kwarteng at a panel for the book Britannia Unchained in 2012

In September 2012 Raab co-authored the book Britannia Unchained. The book addressed issues of the national debt, state education, innovation and work ethic, and asserted that in the opinion of its authors British workers were "the worst idlers in the world” due to their low productivity and a perceived aversion to hard work.

Raab called for measures to cut regulation on start-up companies, expand vocational training, reduce childcare costs and lower marginal (income-focused) rates of taxation to "rediscover and reward the lost virtue of hard-work – a tried and tested route to individual success, a more prosperous economy and a fairer society."

Writing on work ethic in The Daily Telegraph, Raab said that longer periods in education, earlier retirement, welfare dependency and high marginal rates of taxation had led to a situation where "(w)e have a smaller proportion of the workforce pedalling harder to sustain the rest – which is economically debilitating and socially divisive."

== Personal life ==
Raab is married to Erika Rey, a Brazilian marketing executive who until 2020 worked for Google. They live in Thames Ditton, Surrey, and have two children.

Raab holds a black belt, third dan in karate.

In October 2021, following the murder of Sir David Amess, Raab told ITV News that he had received three death threats in the previous two years.

== Awards ==
Raab won Newcomer of the Year for 2011 at The Spectator magazine's Parliamentary Awards.

In 2019, LBC's Iain Dale and a panel placed Raab fourth in a list of that year's "Top 100 Most Influential Conservatives".

== Honours ==
He was sworn in as a member of the Privy Council on 11 July 2018 at Buckingham Palace, entitling him to the honorific prefix "The Right Honourable" for life.

== Notes ==
Parliament of the United Kingdom
Preceded by Ian Taylor	Member of Parliament for Esher and Walton; 2010–2024	Succeeded by Monica Harding
Political offices
Preceded by Simon Hughes	Parliamentary Under-Secretary of State for Civil Liberties and Human Rights; 2015–2016	Succeeded by Phillip Lee
Preceded by Oliver Heald	Minister of State for Courts and Justice; 2017–2018	Succeeded by Rory Stewart
Preceded by Alok Sharma	Minister of State for Housing and Planning; 2018	Succeeded by Kit Malthouse
Preceded by David Davis	Secretary of State for Exiting the European Union; 2018	Succeeded by Steve Barclay
Vacant Title last held by Damian Green	First Secretary of State; 2019–2021	Vacant Title next held by Louise Haigh
Preceded by Jeremy Hunt	Foreign Secretary; 2019–2020	Succeeded by Himself as Foreign Secretary
Preceded by Himself as Foreign Secretary	Foreign Secretary; 2020–2021	Succeeded by Liz Truss
Vacant Title last held by Nick Clegg	Deputy Prime Minister of the United Kingdom; 2021–2022	Succeeded by Thérèse Coffey
Preceded by Robert Buckland	Secretary of State for Justice; 2021–2022	Succeeded by Brandon Lewis
Preceded by Robert Buckland	Lord High Chancellor of Great Britain; 2021–2022	Succeeded by Brandon Lewis
Preceded by Thérèse Coffey	Deputy Prime Minister of the United Kingdom; 2022–2023	Succeeded by Oliver Dowden
Preceded by Brandon Lewis	Secretary of State for Justice; 2022–2023	Succeeded by Alex Chalk
Preceded by Brandon Lewis	Lord High Chancellor of Great Britain; 2022–2023	Succeeded by Alex Chalk
