= Adams Pearmain =

Apple cultivar

Malus domestica 'Adams Pearmain'
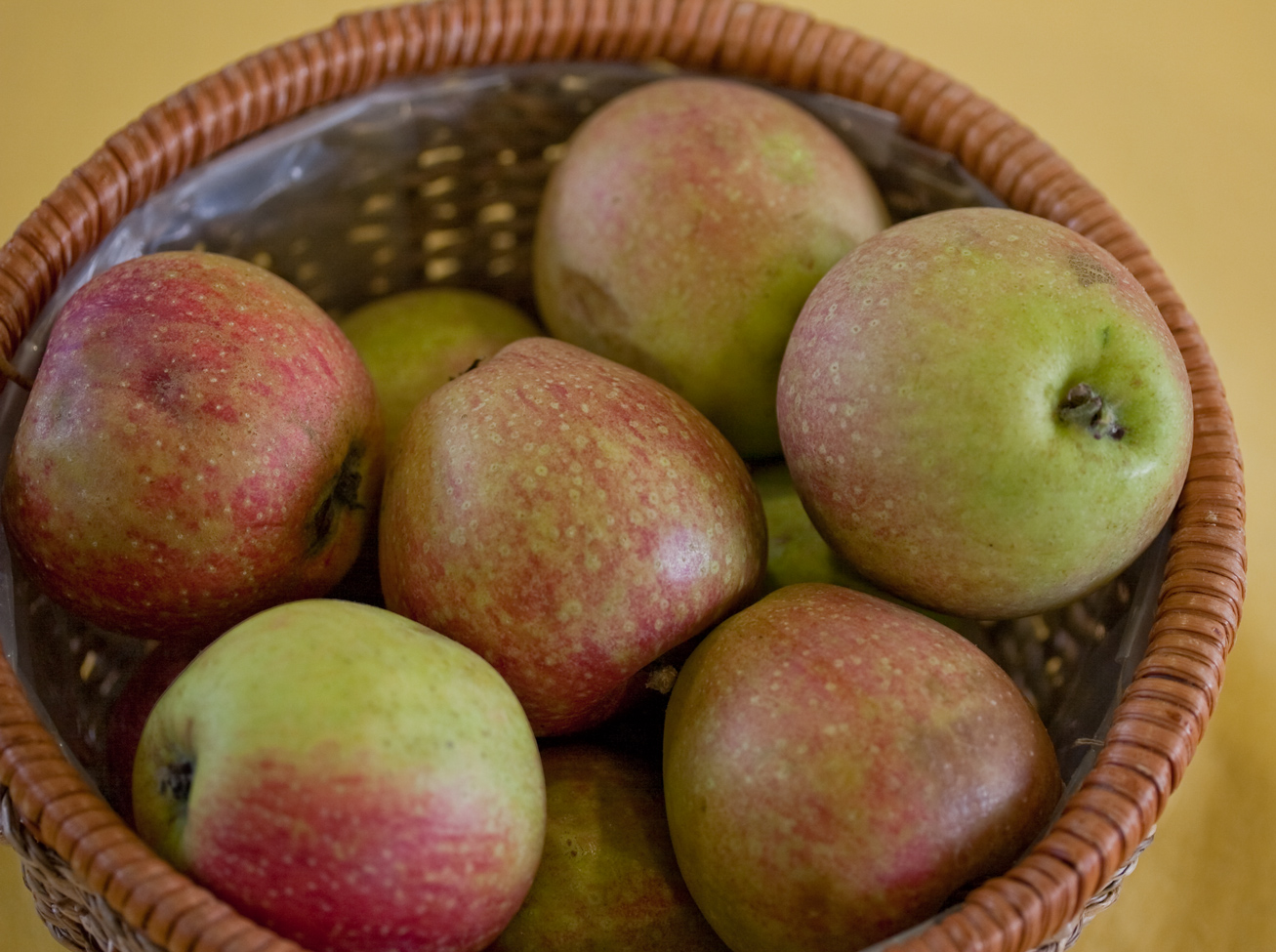
- Species: Malus domestica
- Cultivar: 'Adams Pearmain'
- Origin: (United Kingdom) Herefordshire, UK, 1826

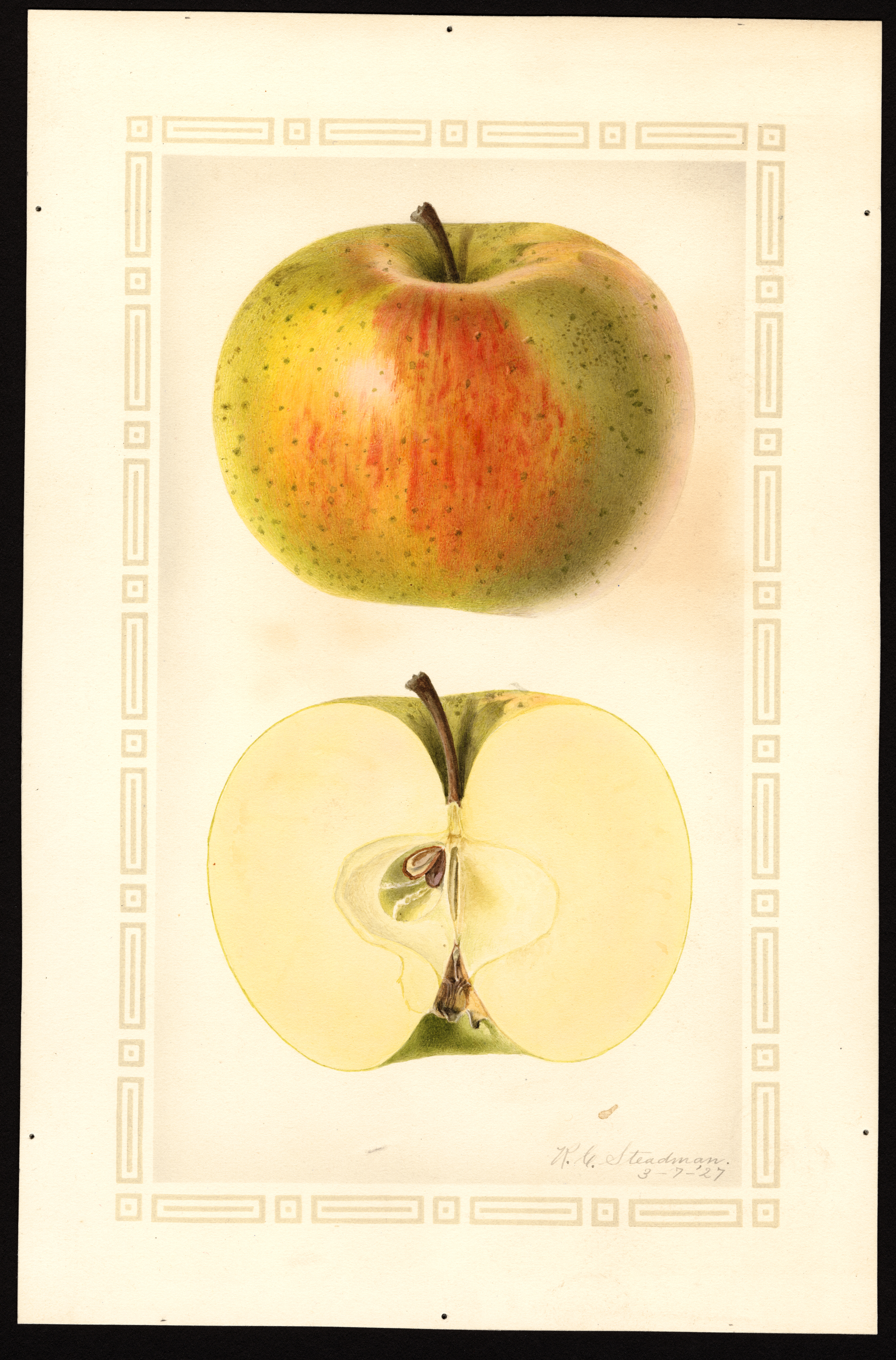

'Adams Pearmain', also called 'Adam's Parmane', (Note: Synonyms are Adam's Parmane, Adam's Pearmain, Adams Parmain, Adams Parman, Adams Parmane, Adams', Adams' Parmaene, Adams' Parmain, Adams' Parmane, Adams's Parmane, Adams's Reinett, Adamsapfel, Adamsova parména, Adamsovo, Adamsparman, Hanging Pearmain, Lady's Finger, Matchless, Moriker, Norfolk Pippin, Norfolk Russet, Norfolk-Adams Parmaene, Parmain d'Adam, Parmaine d'Adams, Parmen Adams, Parmen Adamsa, Pearmain d'Adam, Pearmain d'Adams, Pepin de Norfolk, Pepin du Norfolk, Pippin Golden Hagvey, Rough Pippin, Rousse de Norfolk, Rousse du Norfolk, Russet aus Norfolk, Winter Striper Pearmain) is a cultivar of apple. It was introduced to the Horticultural Society of London in 1826 by Robert Adams, under the name 'Norfolk Pippin'. The fruit is large, varying from two and a half inches to three inches high, and about the same in breadth at the widest part. It is pearmain-shaped, very even, and regularly formed. The skin is pale yellow tinged with green, and covered with delicate russet on the shaded side; but deep yellow tinged with red, and delicately streaked with livelier red on the side facing the sun. The flesh is reddish, crisp, juicy, rich, and sugary, with an agreeable and pleasantly perfumed flavor. This Cultivar is a sibling of Reinette de Hollande, a hybrid between Reinette Franche’ and ‘Reinette des Carmes. (5)

== See also ==
- Pearmain
