= Claygate Pearmain =

Apple cultivar

'Claygate Pearmain'
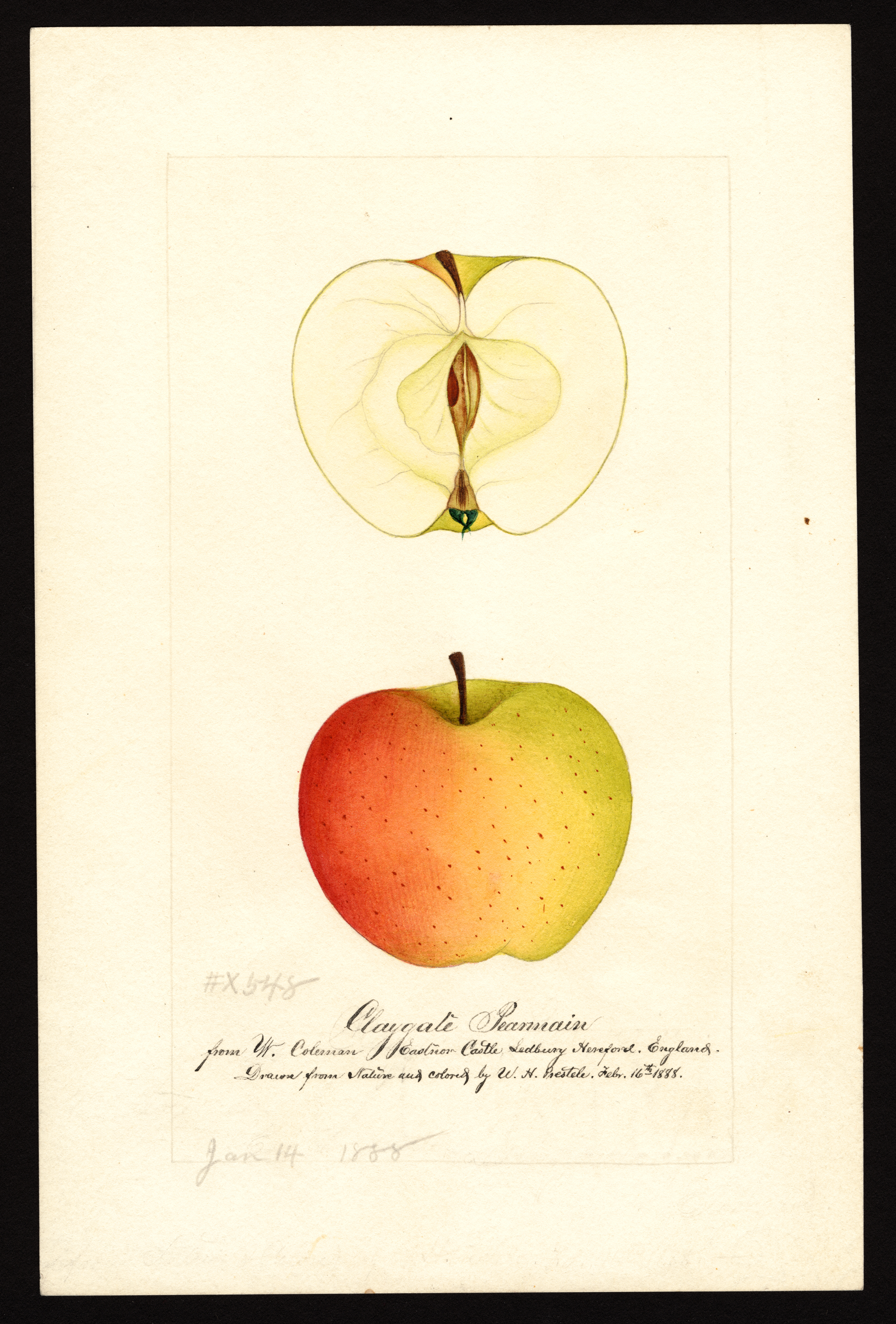
- Origin: introduced 1821, Claygate, Surrey in England

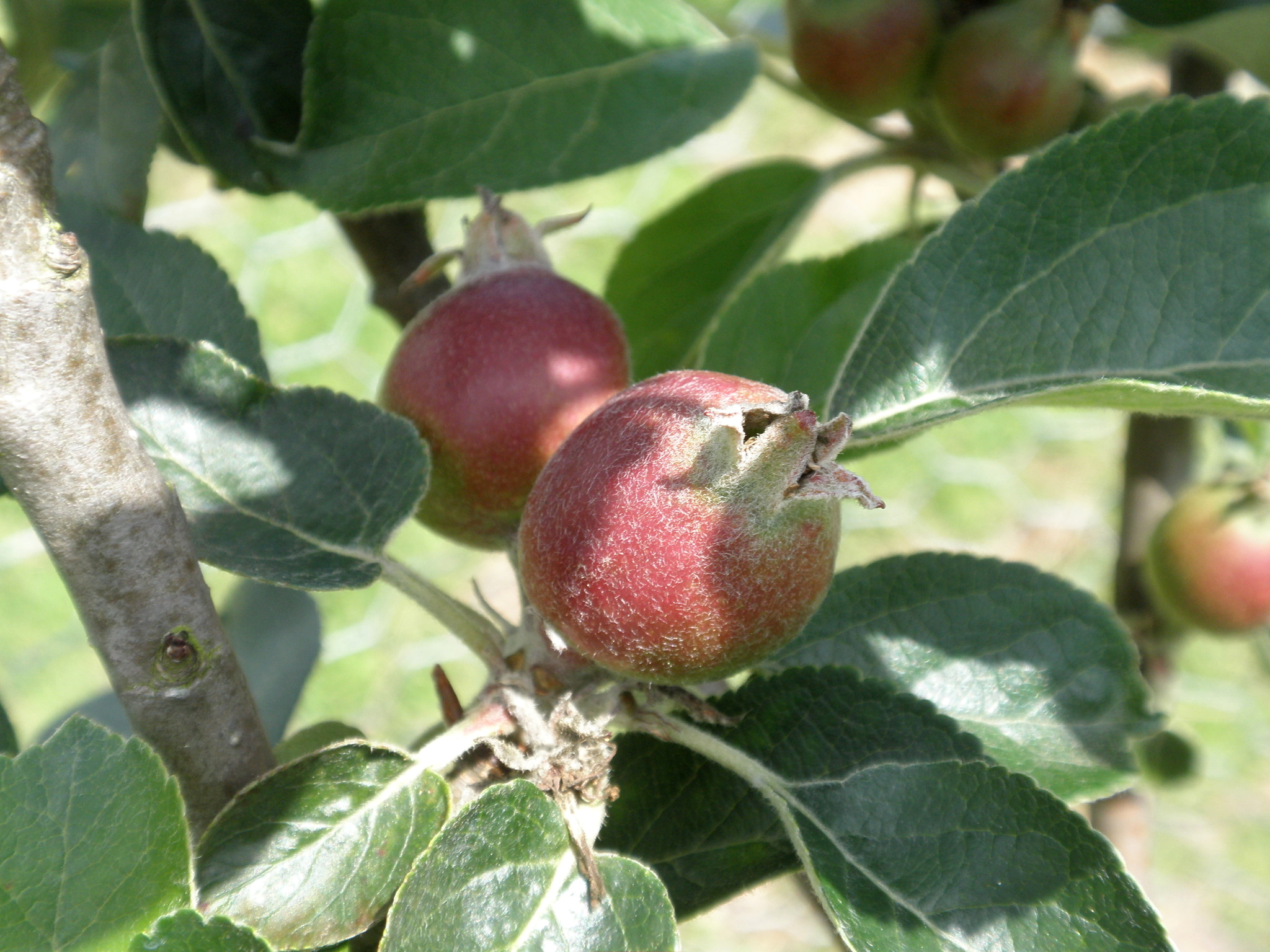
immature fruit on the tree

Claygate Pearmain is an apple cultivar. It was found at Claygate, Surrey in England and brought to the attention of the Royal Horticultural Society by John Braddick in 1821. The apple was a popular eating apple in Victorian times and spread through England and to America.

The apple was found by John Braddick, growing in a hedge at Claygate. Braddick also discovered the 'Braddick Nonpareil' at around the same time and place.

This medium-sized apple is brown-russeted with a crimson patch on the sun-facing side. There is pink-silver tinge to the russet scale. Flesh, yellowish, crisp, juicy, rich, and sugary, partaking of the flavour of the Ribston Pippin. It comes into use in November, and will continue till March. Being both disease and scab resistant.

Claygate Pearmain is self-sterile and requires a pollinator to produce a crop but is a heavy bearer that should be harvested late in the season.

Botanical name - Malus domestica "Claygate Pearmain"

== See also ==
- Pearmain
