= Henry Foley, 5th Baron Foley =

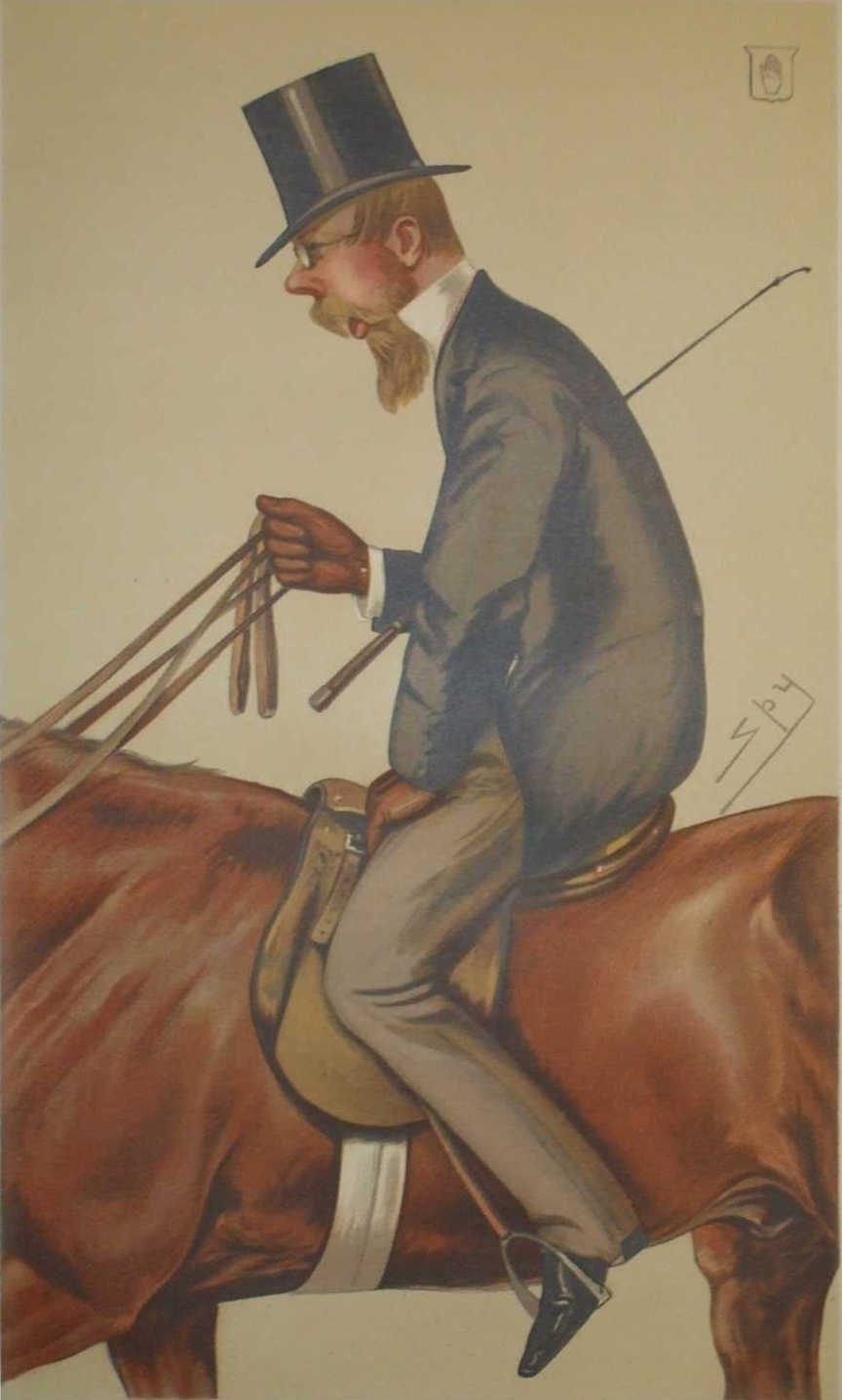
"a liberal Peer" Lord Foley as caricatured by Spy (Leslie Ward) in Vanity Fair, December 1882.

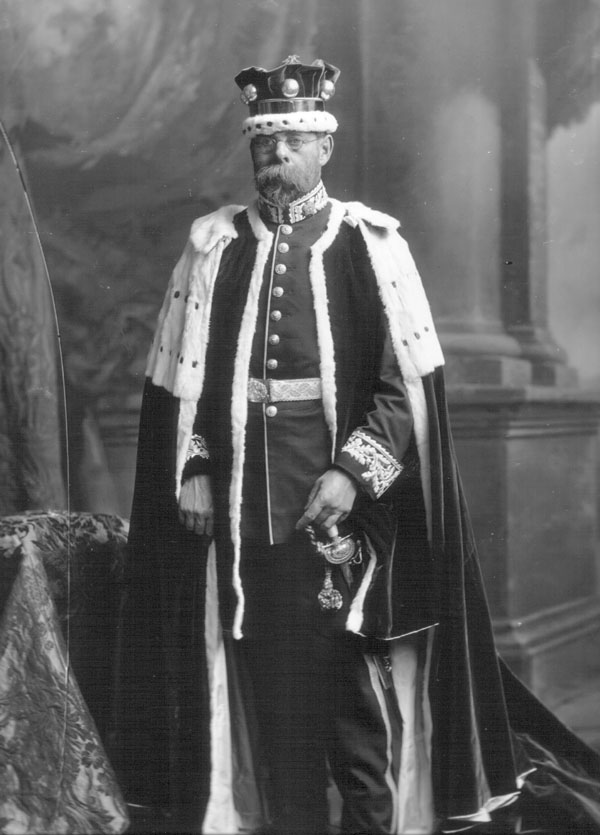
5th Baron Foley. Photographed 11 August 1902.

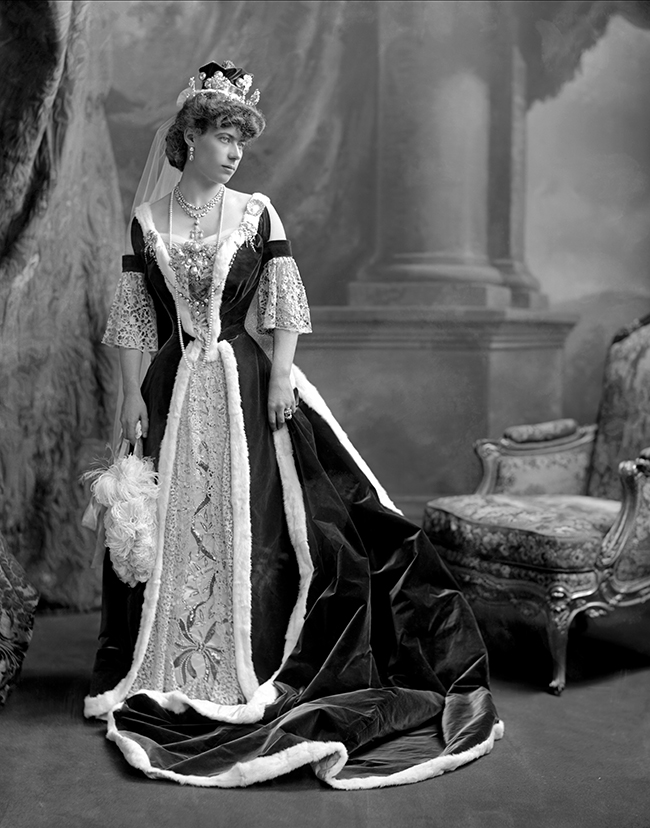
Lady Foley. Photographed 11 August 1902.

Henry Thomas Foley, 5th Baron Foley of Kidderminster DL (4 December 1850 – 17 December 1905), was a British peer.

Foley was the son of Thomas Foley, 4th Baron Foley, and Lady Mary Charlotte Howard, the daughter of Henry Howard, 13th Duke of Norfolk. When his father died in 1869, he inherited his title and wealth.

In 1872, Foley purchased a considerable amount of land at Claygate, Surrey. At the core of this was Ruxley Lodge, "a delightful family mansion moderate in size, but replete with comfort and convenience." Lord Foley added the west wing, with its octagonal tower, turrets and gargoyles making it almost twice as large. The castellated building was renamed Ruxley Towers. The tower is a Grade II listed building.

Foley created extensive housing developments in Claygate with the coming of the railway in the area of Foley Road and Fitzalan Road (named after his brother).

Foley married Evelyne Vaughan Radford, daughter of Arthur Radford, on 25 October 1899 in London. They had no children and when he died at Ruxley Lodge aged 55, he was succeeded by his brother, Lord Fitzalan Charles John Foley, 6th Baron Foley.

Peerage of Great Britain
Preceded by Thomas Foley	Baron Foley; 2nd creation 1869–1905	Succeeded by Fitzalan Foley
