= Pearmain =

Apple cultivar

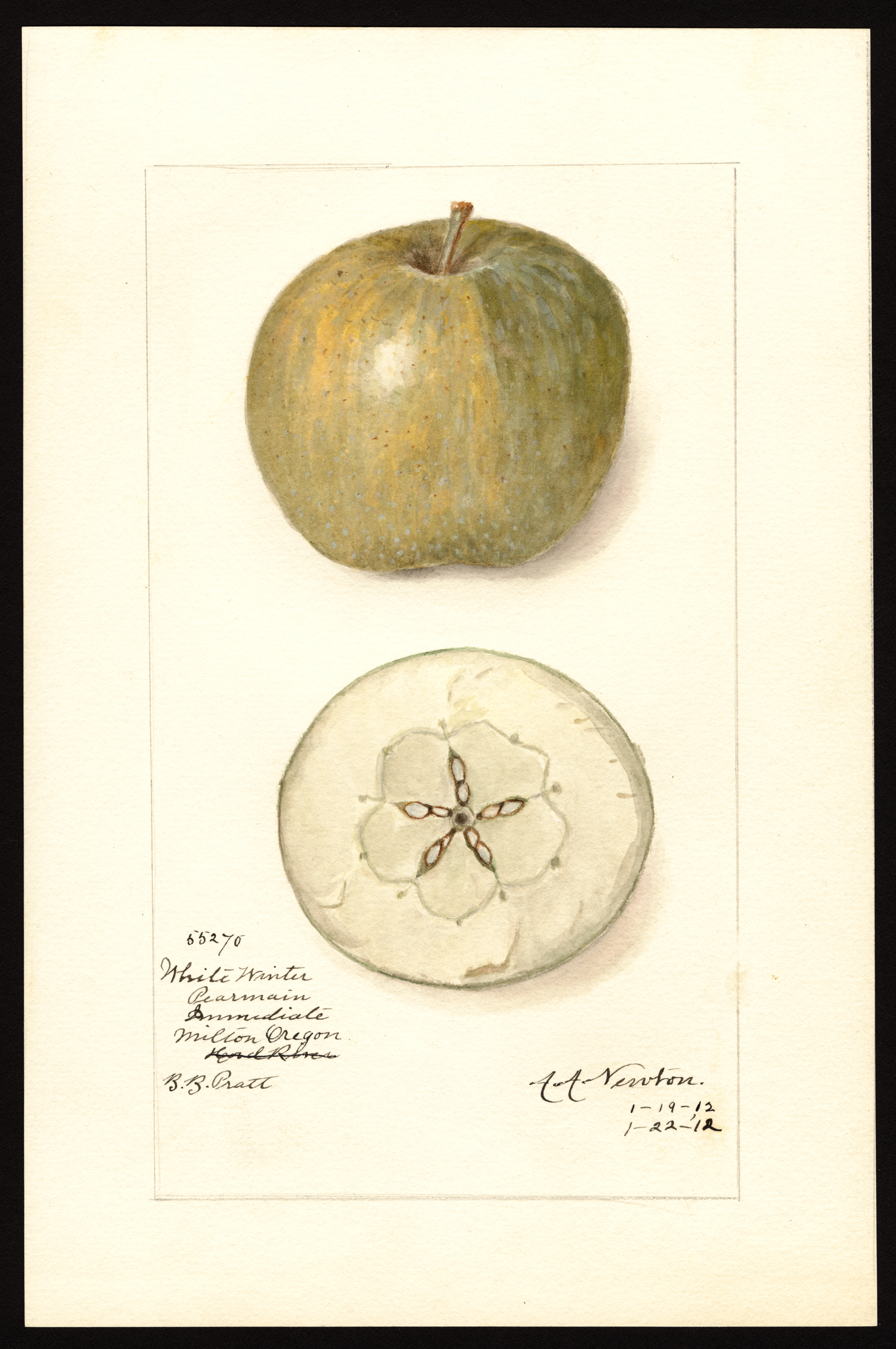
A specimen of 'White Winter Pearmain', collected in Umatilla County, Oregon

A pearmain, also formerly spelled "permain", is a type of apple. The name may once have been applied to a particular variety of apple that kept well, although in more modern times its inclusion in varietal names, like the term 'Pippin', is "largely decoration" rather than indicating any shared qualities.

The original 'Pearmain' variety has not been conclusively identified and may now be extinct.

== Etymology and history ==
There has been some debate over the origin of the name "pearmain". The pomologist Robert Hogg suggested that it originated in mediaeval times from pyrus magnus, "great pear", and referred to a type of apple having a large pear-like shape. Hogg believed that the variety 'Winter Pearmain' was both "the original of all the Pearmains" and the oldest recorded variety of apple in England, with evidence it was cultivated in Norfolk in c.1200.

Other sources suggest that the name "pearmain" was in fact originally used for a type of pear, and was first applied to apples only during the 16th century. It has been suggested the word was derived from Old French pearmain and possibly ultimately from Latin parmensia "of Parma", though the latter is probably folk etymology.

The third and most likely derivation, by the philologist Ernest Weekley, also suggests the term was originally applied to pears, but that it came from Middle English parmain, permain, derived from Old French parmaindre "to endure", and referred to the long keeping qualities of some varieties. Rejecting the etymology from parmensia, Weekley noted that 17th-century references to a "pompire" or "pyramalum" (i.e. an "apple-pear") suggested that the original 'Pearmain' apple was named for some quality associated with the pearmain pear; i.e. hardness and long keeping ability.

== 'Pearmain' cultivars ==
Shape: C = Conical, Ob = Oblong, Ov = Ovate, R = Round, COb = Conical oblong, ROv = Roundish ovate, ROb = Roundish oblate, ObOv = Oblongovate

Pearmain apple cultivars from England

- Adams Pearmain (syn. Norfolk Pippin)
- Augustus Pearmain C
- Balchin's Pearmain
- Baxters Pearmain ROv
- Benwell's Pearmain C
- Bristol Pearmain
- Cherry Pearmain R
- Christmas Pearmain
- Claygate Pearmain
- Federal Pearmain R
- Foulden Pearmain (syn. Horrex's Pearmain) Ov
- Golden Pearmain (syn. Ruckman's Pearmain) C
- Golden Winter Pearmain (syn. King of the Pippins) C
- Grange's Pearmain (syn. Granges Pippin)
- Hormead Pearmain (syn. Arundel Pearmain, Hormead Pippin) R
- Hubbard's Pearmain (syn. Russet Pearmain, Golden Vining, Hammon's Permain)
- Kilkenny Pearmain
- King Charles Pearmain
- Lamb Abbey Pearmain
- Laxton's Pearmain
- London Pearmain
- Mannington's Pearmain
- Mickleham Pearmain ROv
- Old Pearmain
- Oxnead Pearmain (syn. Earl of Yarmouth's Pearmain) C
- Parrys Pearmain Ov
- Ribston Pearmain ROb
- Royal Pearmain (syn. Herefordshire Pearmain, Hertfodshire Pearmain)
- Rushock Pearmain C
- Russet Table Pearmain ObOv
- Scarlet Pearmain(syn. Bell's Scarlet Pearmain Hood's Seedling, Oxford Peach) C
- Summer Pearmain, (syn. Autumn Pearmain) C
- Tibbett's Pearmain C
- Vale Mascal Pearmain R
- Wickham's Pearmain (syn. Week Pearmain)
- Winter Pearmain C
- Worcester Pearmain C

Of uncertain origin

- Barcelona Pearmain (syn. Speckled Pearmain, Polinia Pearmain) Ov

Pearmain apple cultivars from America

- American Summer Pearmain (syn. Early Summer Pearmain) R
- Blue Pearmain
- Canon Peramain Ob
- Clark's Pearmain C
- Cluster Pearmain
- Dan Pearmain R
- Large Striped Pearmain R
- Long Island Peamain Ob
- Red Winter Pearmain
- Russet Pearmain
- Sweet Pearmain
- White Winter Pearmain C
- Winthrop Pearmain

Pearmain cultivars from Germany

- Henzens Parmäne C
- Maibiers Parmäne
- Schwarzenbachs Parmäne COb
- Strawalds Neue Goldparmäne

== Present status of 'Old Pearmain' variety ==
There have been many efforts to identify the original 'Pearmain' apple, of supposedly mediaeval origin. Hogg suggested the 'Winter Pearmain' to be the original, and synonymous with the 'Old Pearmain', though S. A. Beach, in his work Apples of New York, noted that "several different varieties" had been propagated in America and England under the name 'Winter Pearmain' and that in many descriptions "it is impossible to determine which Winter Pearmain the writer had in mind".

By contrast, Hogg believed the apple identified in some catalogues of the time as 'Old Pearmain' to in fact be a variety called 'Royal Pearmain'. Hogg later claimed to have identified the "true Old Pearmain" growing in the Dymock area. The current 'Old Pearmain' in the National Fruit Collection was received in 1924 from a Mr. Kelsey in Surrey, but is probably neither Hogg's variety nor the ancient 'Pearmain'.
