= George Evelyn =

George Evelyn may refer to:

- George Evelyn (1617–1699), English politician, MP for Reigate, Haslemere, and Surrey
- George Evelyn (1641–1699), English politician, MP for Bletchingley and Gatton
- George Evelyn (1678–1724), English politician, MP for Bletchingley
- George Evelyn (born 1970), English musician/DJ, known as Nightmares on Wax or DJ E.A.S.E
