= Costard (apple) =

Apple cultivar

The costard was a variety of apple popular in medieval England, and the second apple-variety (after the pearmain) introduced by the Normans. It was grown widely as a commercial crop by the 13th century and was supplied to the household of Edward I in 1292. It remained widespread for several hundred years, until other apple varieties gained popularity during the 17th century. It is thought to have been a cooking apple and was perhaps similar to the modern Bellflower apple. It is said to have been named for its resemblance to the human head (for which "costard" was another (later) term).

== History ==
The first known named English apple variety was the pearmain which was first mentioned in 1204, having been introduced by the Normans. The costard is the second known variety introduced by the Normans and was commonly grown as a commercial crop in the 13th century. It is mentioned, by the name "Poma Costard", in a fruiterer's bill for Edward I in 1292. In 1296 100 costard apples could be bought in Oxford for one shilling and in 1325 29 costard trees could be purchased for three shillings. The monks of Reading Abbey were entitled by one agreement to an annual payment of "unum pomum costard" (one costard apple), possibly an example of a Peppercorn payment.

The costard apple remained one of the best known and most famous of British apple varieties for several hundred years. The costard and pearmain varieties were the only ones popularly grown in Britain until the 17th century. The costard is said to have long fallen out of favour by the 20th century. It is described as "not known" in the United Kingdom in a report of 1830 and as "now appears to be extinct" in 1967.

== Description ==
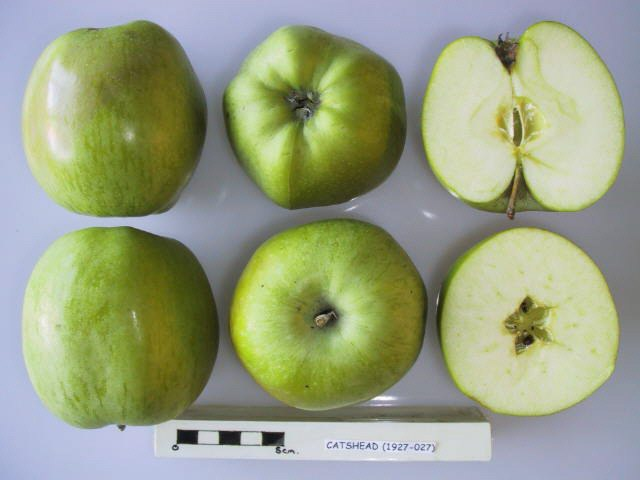
Specimens of the Catshead apple

Nurseryman and pomologist George Lindley described the costard as synonymous with the Catshead apple but this has been disputed. The 17th-century botanist John Parkinson described two varieties of costard: "gray" and "greene". He described the "gray" as a good winter apple, whitish in colour and stated the "greene" was similar apart from coloration of the skin. Leonard Meager in his 1670 work the Complete English Gardener stated there were three types: white, grey and red.

The costard is believed to have been a cooking apple, perhaps similar to the modern Bellflower apple. The name is possibly derived from the Latin costatus ("ribbed"), relating to prominent external protrusions on this variety. The apple gave its name to the costermonger (which was originally "costard monger", a seller of costards), a term used to describe a transient fruit seller.

== In writing ==
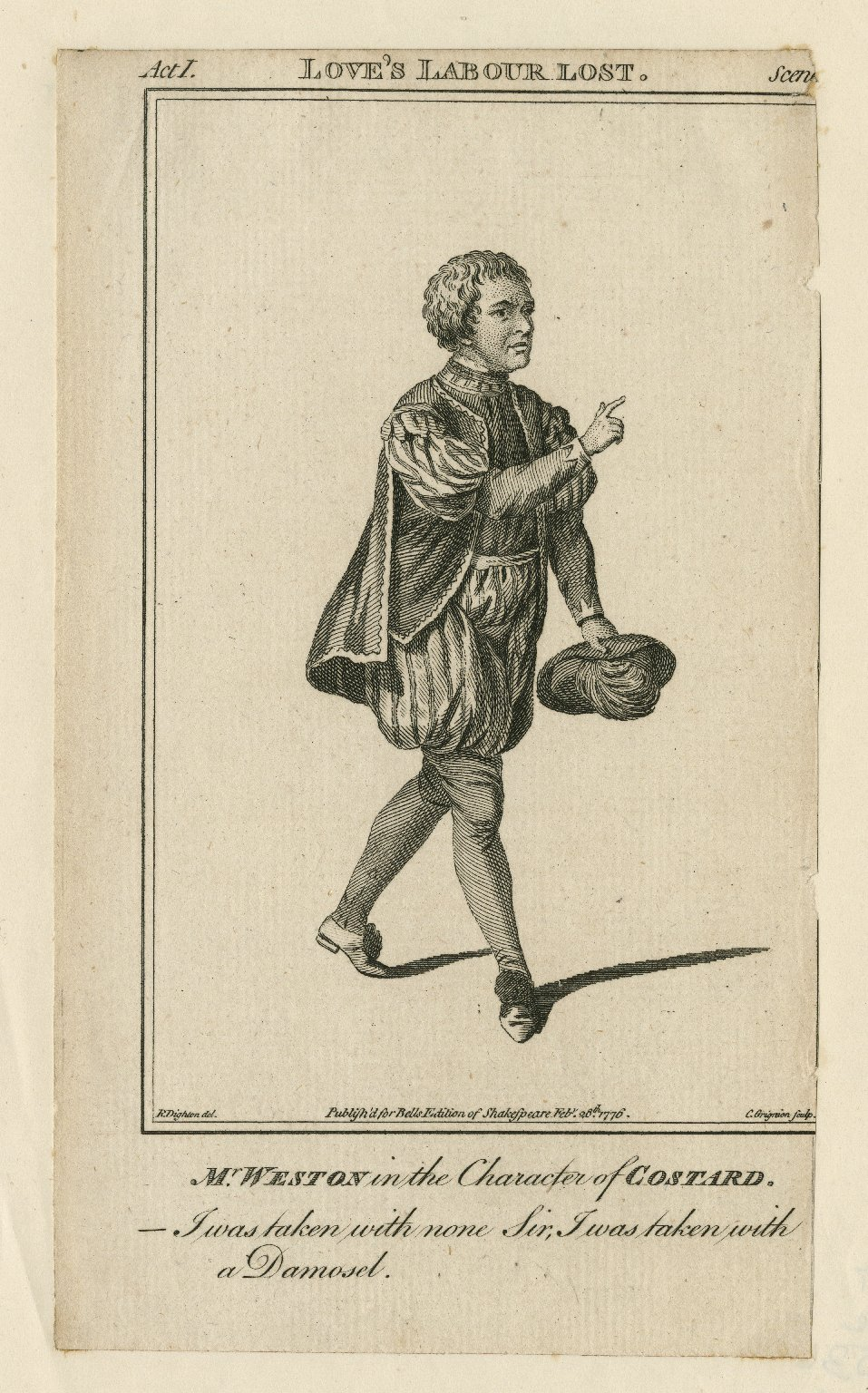
A 1776 depiction of an actor playing Shakespeare's Costard

Geoffrey Chaucer (c. 1340–1400) mentioned the costard in his work, writing: "your chekes embolmed like a mellow costard". In 1597 William Lawson wrote about growing apple trees and stated that the costard and "Pipping" apple were large trees and that to ensure best yields they should be grown on the north side of an orchard so as not to shade other trees.

Samuel Johnson in his 1755 A Dictionary of the English Language thought that the name derived from the use of costard to refer to the head (for which he cited Shakespeare). He supposed that the apple was so named as it was large and round and thus resembled a head. Shakespeare uses the term in scene IV of act I of Richard III (1593) where one of the murderers suggests hitting the Duke of Clarence over the head with their sword hilts. In his mid-1590s comedy Love's Labour's Lost the court jester to the King of Navarre is named Costard.
