= Monica Harding =

British politician

Monica Harding MP
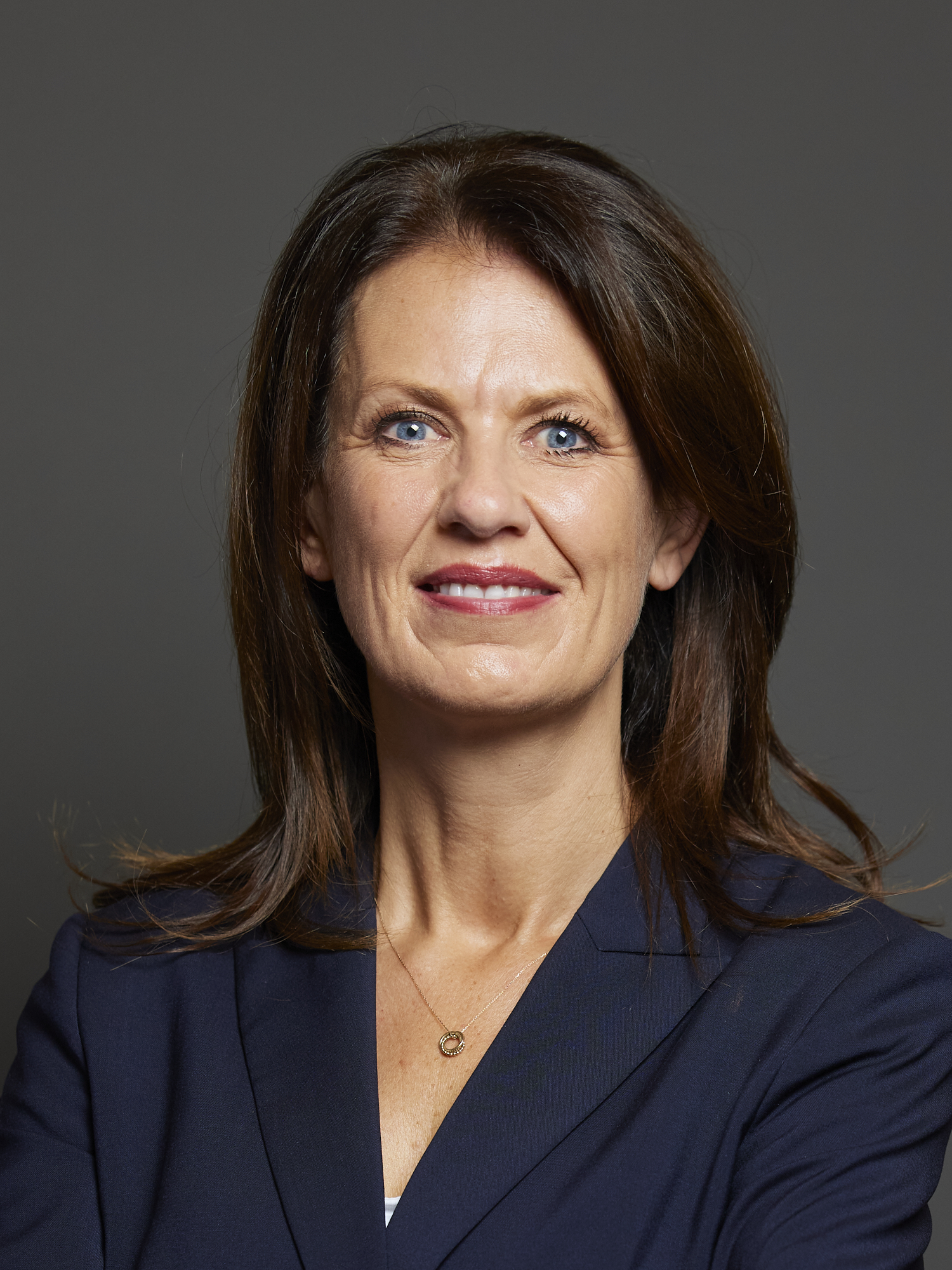
- Official portrait, 2024

Member of Parliament for Esher and Walton
- Incumbent
- Assumed office 4 July 2024
- Preceded by: Dominic Raab
- Majority: 12,003 (22.3%)

Liberal Democrat spokesperson for International Development
- Incumbent
- Assumed office 18 September 2024
- Leader: Ed Davey
- Preceded by: Layla Moran

Personal details
- Party: Liberal Democrats
- Education: University of Manchester

Monica Bernadette Etheldreda Harding (born 21 January 1972) is a British Liberal Democrat politician who has been Member of Parliament (MP) for Esher and Walton since 2024. Before she entered politics, Harding was a management consultant, and director and CEO of organisations in Europe and Asia.

== Education ==
She holds a BA in English from the University of Manchester.

== Career ==
Before entering politics, Harding was a director, chief executive officer and management consultant, working in organisations in Europe and Asia. She was director of communications at the British Council and president and CEO of Refugees International Japan.

Harding contested the 2019 general election in the constituency of Esher and Walton, finishing in second place and reducing the majority of the incumbent Conservative MP Dominic Raab, then foreign secretary and later deputy prime minister, from 23,298 to 2,743.

In the 2024 general election, Harding was elected as MP for Esher and Walton with 52.6 per cent of the vote and a majority of 12,003. Voter turnout was 72.8%. She became the constituency's first female MP, and the first not to be elected from the Conservative Party in more than a century.

On 18 September, Harding was appointed by Leader of the Liberal Democrats Ed Davey as the party spokesperson for International Development as part of his Frontbench Team.

== Personal life ==
Harding had lived in Thames Ditton for 17 years as of 2024. She has four children.

Parliament of the United Kingdom
Preceded by Dominic Raab	Member of Parliament for Esher and Walton; 2024–present	Incumbent
