= Evelyn (name) =

- Pronunciation: /ˈɛvəlɪn, ˈiːvlɪn/ EV-ə-lin, EEV-lin
- Gender: Unisex

Origin
- Origin: Norman French Aveline
- Region of origin: English-speaking areas, Germany, Estonia

Other names
- Variant forms: Eveline, Evelyne, Eveleen, Evelin, Evelien

Evelyn is a matronymic English surname derived from the medieval girl's name Aveline (which is of Norman origin and represents a diminutive form of Ava). Since the 17th century, it has also been used as a given name. The earliest recorded bearer was Evelyn Pierrepont (d. 1726), who was a grandson of the Roundhead politician Sir John Evelyn. The family subsequently used the name for both male and female children, including Pierrepont's third daughter.

The English census of 1841 listed 84 Evelyns, half male and half female. By 1851, there were 88 male and 196 female Evelyns. On the other side of the Atlantic, the 1850 United States census listed 53 male and 310 female Evelyns. The name has continued to be predominantly feminine since.

The name jumped in popularity in 1907 due to the influence of Evelyn Nesbit, the first "supermodel", whose husband Harry Kendall Thaw murdered Stanford White in 1906 over his alleged sexual assault of Nesbit. The publicized trial and Nesbit's subsequent fame caused Evelyn to become the 10th most popular name for girls in the US in 1915. It remained within the top 50 into the 1940s, but had dropped to 287th by 1980. The 1981 movie Ragtime, which featured Evelyn Nesbit as a character, brought the name renewed attention. Evelyn became a popular girls' name again in the 21st century, becoming 8th most popular in the US in 2024 and 13th most popular in England and Wales in 2023. Notable Evelyns in modern popular culture include Rachel Weisz's character in the 1999 movie The Mummy (based on Lady Evelyn Herbert, the first woman to enter Tutankhamun's tomb) and Kate Beckinsale's character in the 2001 movie Pearl Harbor.

In some cases, the given name may represent an anglicized form of the Irish names Aibhilín and Éibhleann. The former is also a descendant of Aveline, while the latter is said to derive from the Old Irish óiph ("beauty, radiance").

== People with this first name ==
=== Women ===
- Evelyn Anderson (dancer) (1907–1994), American dancer
- Evelyn M. Anderson (1899–1985), American physiologist and biochemist
- Evelyn Ankers (1918–1985), American actress
- Evelyn Ashford (born 1957), America female sprinter, gold medalist of the women's 100 meters running during the 1984 Summer Olympics
- Evelyn Aswad (fl. 1990s–2020s), American legal scholar and professor at the University of Oklahoma College of Law
- Evelyn Margaret Ay (1933–2008), American beauty pageant winner (Miss America, 1954)
- Evelyn Bargelt (1877–1957), American entertainer and portrait artist
- Evelyn Vida Baxter (1879–1959), Scottish ornithologist
- Lady Evelyn Beauchamp, née Herbert (1901–1980), daughter of 5th Earl of Carnarvon and one of the first in people in modern times to enter Tutankhamun's tomb
- Evelyn Berezin (1925–2018), American computer designer best known for designing the first computer-driven word processor
- Evelyn Bonaci (1916–2008), Maltese politician
- Evelyn Booth (1897–1988), Irish botanist
- Evelyn Brent (1901–1975), American film and stage actress
- Evelyn Campbell (actress) (1868 – ?), British-born American actress
- Evelyn Carow (born 1931), German movie editor
- Evelyn Carrera (born 1971), Dominican Republic volleyball player
- Evelyn Cavendish, Duchess of Devonshire (1870–1960)
- Evelyn Cheesman (1882–1969), British entomologist and traveller
- Evelyn Colon (1961–1976), formerly unidentified American homicide victim
- Evelyn Colyer (1902–1930), British tennis player
- Evelyn Connor, American politician
- Evelyn Y. Davis (1929–2018), American activist shareholder
- Evelyn Magruder DeJarnette (1842–1914), American author
- Evelyn De Morgan (1855–1919), English Pre-Raphaelite painter
- Evelyn de Soysa (1893–1973), third woman member of Senate of Ceylon (present-day Sri Lanka)
- Evelyn Dick (1920-unknown), Canadian convicted murderer
- Evelyn Dove (1902–1987), British singer and actress
- Evelyn Everett-Green (1856–1932), English novelist
- Evelyn Finley (1916–1989), American actress and stuntwoman
- Evelyn Furtsch (1914–2015), American sprinter
- Evelyn Gandy (1920–2007), American Lieutenant Governor of the state of Mississippi
- Evelyn García (born 1982), Salvadorian cyclist
- Evelyn Gardner (1903–1994), English aristocrat and socialite, and first wife of Evelyn Waugh
- Evelyn Gigantes (1942–2026), Canadian politician and Cabinet Minister
- Evelyn Glennie (born 1965), Scottish virtuoso percussionist who has been deaf since age 12
- Evelyn Gleeson (1855–1944), English embroidery, carpet, and tapestry designer
- Evelyn Beatrice Hall (1868–1956), English writer and biographer of Voltaire
- Evelyn Hamann (1942–2007), German actress
- Evelyn Hart (born 1956), Canadian ballerina and principal dancer of the Royal Winnipeg Ballet
- Evelyn Hartley (born 1938), American woman who has been missing since 1953
- Evelyn Hatch (1871–1951), English muse of Charles Lutwidge Dodgson
- Evelyn Holt (1908–2001), German film actress
- Evelyn Hooker (1907–1996), American psychologist most noted for her studies on homosexuality
- Evelyn Hoskins (born 1988), British actress
- Evelyn Bryan Johnson (1909–2012), American pilot with a world record number of flying hours
- Evelyn Keyes (1916–2008), American actress most noted for her role as Suellen O'Hara in the 1939 film Gone with the Wind
- Evelyn "Champagne" King (born 1960), American R&B and disco singer
- Evelyn Künneke (1921–2001), German singer and actress
- Evelyn Lau (born 1971), Chinese-Canadian poet and novelist
- Evelyn Laye (1900–1996), British theatre actress
- Evelyn Lear (1926–2012), American soprano and opera singer
- Evelyn Lincoln (1909–1995), personal secretary to John F. Kennedy from his election to the Senate in 1953 until his 1963 assassination
- Evelyn Beatrice Longman (1874–1954), American sculptor elected as a full member of the National Academy of Design
- Evelyn Mase (1922–2004), South African nurse and first wife of Nelson Mandela
- Evelyn Matthei (born 1953), Chilean politician, former Minister of Labor and candidate for President of Chile in 2013
- Evelyn McHale (1923–1947), American bookkeeper, subject of an iconic photograph showing her body after she jumped from an observation platform of the Empire State Building
- Evelyn Millard (1869–1941), English Shakespearean actress
- Evelyn Mora (born 1992), Finnish entrepreneur
- Evelyn Nesbit (1884–1967), American model noted for her entanglement in the murder of her ex-lover by her first husband
- Evelyn Paul (1883–1963), British illustrator
- Evelyn Pope (1908–1995), American librarian
- Evelyn Preer (1896–1932), African-American actress and blues singer
- Evelyn Reed (1905–1979), leading member of the American Socialist Workers Party and women's rights agitator
- Evelyn Regner (born 1966), Austrian Member of the European Parliament
- Evelyn Sandberg-Vavalà (1888–1961) also known as Evelyn May Graham Sandberg or Evelyn Kendrew, art historian
- Evelyn Schötz (born 1961), German politician
- Evelyn Sears (1875–1966), American tennis player
- Evelyn Selbie (1871–1950), American actress
- Evelyn Sharma (born 1986), German-Indian actress and model
- Evelyn Šilina (born 2001), Estonian footballer
- Evelyn Stevens (cyclist) (born 1983), American road cyclist
- Evelyn Strang (1867–1954), Australian temperance leader and suffragist
- Evelyn Greenleaf Sutherland (1855–1908), American journalist, author and playwright
- Evelyn Thomas (1953–2024), American disco singer
- Evelyn Tubb (born 1954), English soprano and long-time member of The Consort of Musicke
- Evelyn Underhill (1875–1941), English writer on mysticism and metaphysical poet
- Evelyn Valdez-Ward, scientist, science communicator, adjunct professor, and immigration activist living in the U.S.
- Evelyn van Leeuwen (born 1972), Dutch wheelchair basketball player
- Evelyn Varden (1893–1958), American character actress
- Evelyn Verrasztó (born 1989), Hungarian swimmer
- Evelyn Svec Ward (1921–1989), American fiber artist
- Evelyn Wells (1899–1984), American biographer, especially of the ancient Egyptian royals
- Evelyn Whitaker (1844–1929), English children's writer
- Evelyn Prescott Wiggin (1900–1964), American mathematician and university professor
- Evelyn Williams (artist) (1929–2012), British artist
- Evelyn Williamson (born 1971), New Zealand triathlon athlete
- Evelyn M. Witkin (1921–2023), American geneticist
- Evelyn Wood (teacher) (1909–1995), American advocate of speed reading
- Evelyn Young (1915–1983), American film actress
- Evelyn Zangger (born 1980), Swiss singer-songwriter

==== Female variants ====
Eveleen

- Eveleen Laura Mason (1838–1914), American writer
- Eveleen Myers (1856–1937), English photographer
- Eveleen O'Brien (1901–1981), Irish psychiatrist
- Eveleen Mary Weldon Severn (1882–1942), American philatelist

Evelien

- Evelien Bosmans (born 1989), Belgian actress
- Evelien Gerrits (born 1985), Dutch cricketer
- Evelien Koogje (born 1959), Dutch rower

Evelin

- Evelin Hagoel (born 1961), Israeli actress
- Evelin Ilves (born 1968), former First Lady of Estonia
- Evelin Jahl (born 1956), German discus thrower
- Evelin Lanthaler (born 1991), Italian luger
- Evelin Lindner (born 1954), German-Norwegian medical doctor, psychologist, scholar and author
- Evelin Novak (born 1985), Croatian opera soprano
- Evelin Ramón (born 1979), Cuban composer and singer
- Evelin Samuel (born 1975), Estonian singer
- Evelin Talts (born 1977), Estonian long-distance runner
- Evelin Vacsi (born 1993), Hungarian volleyball player
- Evelin Võigemast (born 1980), Estonian actress

Eveline

- Eveline Dew Blacker (1884–1956), British architect
- Eveline Brunner (born 1996), Swiss figure skater
- Eveline Burgess (1856–1936), American chess player
- Eveline M. Burns (1900–1985), British-American economist, writer and instructor
- Eveline Crone (born 1975), Dutch neuroscientist
- Eveline Cruickshanks (1926–2021), British historian
- Eveline de Haan (born 1976), Dutch field hockey player
- Eveline Du Bois-Reymond Marcus (1901–1990), German zoologist and drawer
- Eveline Fischer (born 1969), British video game music composer
- Éveline Gélinas (born 1974), Canadian actress
- Eveline Hańska (c. 1805–1882), Polish noblewoman, wife of Honoré de Balzac
- Eveline Hasler (born 1933), Swiss writer
- Eveline Herfkens (born 1952), Dutch civil servant, diplomat, and politician
- Eveline Hill (1898–1973), British Conservative Party politician
- Eveline Lowe (1869–1956), British politician
- Eveline Adelheid von Maydell (1890–1962), German silhouette artist
- Eveline Nünchert (born 1943), German chess player
- Eveline Peleman (born 1993), Belgian rower
- Eveline Peterson (1877–1944), English badminton player
- Eveline Saalberg (born 1998), Dutch track and field athlete
- Eveline Winifred Syme (1888–1961), Australian artist
- Eveline Widmer-Schlumpf (born 1956), Swiss lawyer and politician

Evelyne

- Évelyne Beaudin (born 1988), Canadian politician
- Evelyne Webb Bowdich (1861–1930), English writer
- Evelyne Brochu (born 1983), Canadian actress
- Evelyne Butoyi, Burundi politician
- Evelyne Gebhardt (born 1954), German politician
- Evelyne Hall (1909–1993), American athlete
- Evelyne Leu (born 1976), Swiss freestyle skier
- Evelyne Isaack Mbede (born 1957), Tanzanian geologist
- Evelyne Pinard (1923–2014) French national javelin athlete
- Evelyne de Pontbriand (1950–2024), French winemaker
- Évelyne Sullerot (1924–2017), French feminist
- Évelyne Thomas (born 1964), French television host

=== Men ===
- Evelyn Ashley (1836–1907), British barrister and Liberal politician
- Evelyn Baring, 1st Earl of Cromer (1841–1917), Consul-General of Egypt from 1883 to 1907
- Evelyn Baring, 1st Baron Howick of Glendale (1903–1973), Governor of Kenya from 1952 to 1959
- Evelyn Barker (1894–1983), British Army officer in World War I and II
- Evelyn Boscawen, 6th Viscount Falmouth (1819–1889), British horse breeder
- Evelyn Denison, 1st Viscount Ossington (1800–1873), British statesman
- G. Evelyn Hutchinson (1903–1991), British ecologist
- Evelyn King (politician) (1907–1994), British member of Parliament
- Evelyn Frederick Charles Ludowyk (1906–1985), Sri Lankan Burgher Trotskyist, author, playwright, critic
- Evelyn Owen (1915–1949), Australian inventor of the Owen submachine gun
- Evelyn Pierrepont, 1st Duke of Kingston-upon-Hull (c. 1655–1726)
- Evelyn Pierrepont, 2nd Duke of Kingston-upon-Hull (1711–1773)
- Evelyn Pierrepont (MP) (1775–1801), British Member of Parliament
- Evelyn George Harcourt Powell (1883–1961), English politician
- Evelyn de Rothschild (1931–2022), British financier and member of the prominent Rothschild family
- Evelyn Seymour, 17th Duke of Somerset (1882–1954)
- Evelyn Shirley (1788–1856), British politician
- Evelyn Shirley (1812–1882), British politician, antiquary and genealogist
- Evelyn Shirley Shuckburgh (1843–1906), English classical scholar
- Evelyn Stuart (1773–1842), British soldier and Tory politician
- Evelyn Sturt (1815–1885), English-born Australian police magistrate
- Evelyn Waugh (1903–1966), English satirical novelist, whose first wife was Evelyn Gardner
- Evelyn Webb-Carter (born 1946), former advisor to Elizabeth, the Queen Mother and current Controller of the Army Benevolent Fund
- Evelyn Wood (British Army officer) (1838–1919), British Field marshal, Victoria Cross recipient

== People with this surname ==
- Ann Evelyn (1767–1791), English aristocrat and heiress
- Deborah Evelyn (born Deborah Evelyn Sochaczewski), Brazilian actress
- Edward Evelyn, 1st Baronet, Tory MP
- Edward Evelyn (footballer), Welsh athlete
- Frederick Evelyn, 3rd Baronet, English aristocrat
- George Evelyn (disambiguation), multiple people
- Gilbert Evelyn, English politician
- Hugh Evelyn, 5th Baronet, British naval officer
- John Evelyn (disambiguation):
  - John Evelyn (1620–1706), English writer, gardener and diarist
  - John Evelyn (1591–1664), English politician, MP for Bletchingley
  - John Evelyn (Parliamentarian) (1601–1685), English politician
  - John Evelyn the Younger (1655–1699), English translator
  - Sir John Evelyn, 1st Baronet, of Godstone (1633–1671)
  - John Evelyn (1677–1702), English politician, MP for Bletchingley
  - Sir John Evelyn, 1st Baronet, of Wotton (1682–1763), British politician
  - Sir John Evelyn, 2nd Baronet MP for Helston 1727–1741 and 1747–1767 and Penryn 1741–1747
  - John Evelyn of Wotton (1743–1827), cousin of Frederick Evelyn
  - Sir John Evelyn, 4th Baronet (c. 1758–1833)
  - John Evelyn (bobsleigh) (born 1939), British Olympic bobsledder
- Judith Evelyn (born Judith Evelyn Morris), American actress
- Julia Evelyn (1757–1797), English aristocrat and landowner
- Julia Shuckburgh-Evelyn (1790–1814), British aristocrat
- Leya Evelyn, Canadian artist
- Lyndon Evelyn, Tory MP
- William Evelyn (disambiguation):
  - William Evelyn (priest) (died 1776), Dean of Emly in Ireland
  - William Evelyn (British Army officer) (1723–1783), British Lieutenant–General
  - William Evelyn (died 1813), Member of Parliament for Hythe
  - William John Evelyn (1822–1908), Member of Parliament for West Surrey and Deptford
  - William Arthur Evelyn (1860–1935), historian of York

== Fictional characters ==
- Evelyn, a character in the film Pearl Harbor
- Evelynn, Agony's Embrace, a playable champion character in the video game League of Legends and its associated virtual band K/DA
- Evelyn Evelyn, Conjoined twins Eva and Lyn who put their names together to form "Evelyn" so they can clear confusion. Because of their longing for privacy and inability to be separated, they grew to hate each other.
- Evil-Lyn, a character from the Masters of the Universe toy line and associated media
- Lady Eveline Amyott, female protagonist of the drama The Wife's Secret by George William Lovell.
- Evelyn Borden, a character in The Ring Two and Rings, played by Mary Elizabeth Winstead, Sissy Spacek, and Kayli Carter at different points
- Evelyn Carnahan/O'Connell, lead character in Stephen Sommers' reboot of The Mummy franchise
- Evelyn Chevalier, a playable character of the videogame Zenless Zone Zero
- Evelyn Claythorne, former employee of TASCorp, Tari's envious gaming partner, and overall secondary antagonist of Meta Runner seasons two and three
- Evelyn Couch, a character in the 1991 American comedy-drama Fried Green Tomatoes
- Evelyn Deavor, a character in Incredibles 2
- Evelyn Draper, a obsessive fan stalker in Play Misty for Me.
- Evelyn Harper, mother of Charlie and Alan Harper on Three and a Half Men
- Evelyn Hugo, titular character of the novel The Seven Husbands of Evelyn Hugo by Taylor Jenkins Reid
- Evelyn Johnson, Tobias Eaton's mother in the Divergent trilogy.
- Evelyn Miller, an author in Red Dead Redemption 2, played by Gibson Frazier
- Ted Evelyn Mosby, the protagonist in the TV series How I Met Your Mother
- Evelyn Cross Mulwray, played by Faye Dunaway in the classic noir film Chinatown
- Evelyn Napier, a character from Downton Abbey, portrayed by Brendan Patricks
- Evelyn Oakleigh, Hope's wealthy and eccentric English fiancé from Anything Goes
- Evelyn Parker, a character from Cyberpunk 2077 voiced by Kari Wahlgren.
- Evelyn Peters, the English teacher of Alex and Conner Bailey in The Land of Stories
- Evelyn Robin, the wife of Christopher Robin in Disney's "Christopher Robin"
- Evelyn Sharp/Artemis Crock, a character from Arrow
- Evelyn Shaw, a character in the TV series Chuck
- Evelyn Smythe, played by Maggie Stables in a series of audio plays produced by Big Finish Productions based on Doctor Who
- Evelyn Bluthorn Stratton, a character in the American TV sitcom Silver Spoons
- Evelyn Tremble, played by Peter Sellers in the James Bond satire Casino Royale
- Evelyn Quan Wang, the protagonist in the film Everything Everywhere All at Once
