= John Evelyn (disambiguation) =

John Evelyn (1620–1706) was an English writer.

John Evelyn is also the name of:

- John Evelyn (1591–1664), English politician, MP for Bletchingley
- John Evelyn (Parliamentarian) (1601–1685), English politician
- John Evelyn the Younger (1655–1699), English translator
- Sir John Evelyn, 1st Baronet, of Godstone (1633–1671)
- John Evelyn (1677–1702), English politician, MP for Bletchingley
- Sir John Evelyn, 1st Baronet, of Wotton (1682–1763), British politician
- Sir John Evelyn, 2nd Baronet MP for Helston 1727–1741 and 1747–1767 and Penryn 1741–1747
- John Evelyn of Wotton (1743–1827), cousin of Frederick Evelyn
- Sir John Evelyn, 4th Baronet (c. 1758 – 1833)
- John Evelyn (bobsleigh) (born 1939), British Olympic bobsledder
