= Evelyn baronets of Wotton (1713) =

Escutcheon of the Evelyn baronets of Wotton

The Evelyn baronetcy, of Wotton, Surrey, was created on 6 August 1713 in the Baronetage of Great Britain for John Evelyn, Member of Parliament for Helston from 1708 to 1710 and Joint Postmaster General 1708–1715. He was a grandson of John Evelyn the diarist.

The baronetcy became extinct on the death in 1848 of the 5th Baronet.

== Evelyn baronets, of Wotton, Surrey (1713) ==
- Sir John Evelyn, 1st Baronet (1 March 1682 – 15 July 1763). He was succeeded by his son.
- Sir John Evelyn, 2nd Baronet (24 August 1706 – 11 June 1767), MP for Helston 1727–1741 and 1747–1767 and Penryn 1741–1747. He was succeeded by his son.
- Sir Frederick Evelyn, 3rd Baronet (1734 – 1 April 1812). On his death, the baronetcy passed to a cousin.
- Sir John Evelyn, 4th Baronet (c. 1758 – 14 May 1833). When he killed a postman, he was declared of unsound mind (28 July 1795) and spent the rest of his life in prison. He was succeeded by his brother.
- Sir Hugh Evelyn, 5th Baronet (31 January 1769 – 28 August 1848). He spent a period in the King's Bench Prison, unable to pay a court fine.

== Notes ==
Baronetage of Great Britain
Preceded by Crosse baronets	Evelyn baronets of Wotton; 6 August 1713	Succeeded by Des Bouverie baronets
