= Hugh Evelyn =

British baronet and naval officer

Sir Hugh Evelyn, 5th Baronet (31 January 1769 – 28 August 1848) was a British baronet and naval officer.

== Family background ==
Hugh was the youngest son of Charles Evelyn, by Philippa Wright, the daughter of Fortunatus Wright, the privateer. Charles Evelyn was the only son of another Charles Evelyn, who was the brother of Sir John Evelyn, 2nd Baronet, and the second son of Sir John Evelyn, 1st Baronet of Wotton. The elder Charles, of Yarlington, Somerset, died aged 40 in January 1748, while the younger Charles died before 1781. As the third baronet, Sir Frederick Evelyn, had no children, Sir John Evelyn, 4th Baronet, his first cousin once removed, was his nearest male heir.

== Succession ==
Hugh Evelyn was born on 31 January 1769 at Totnes, Devon. He was an officer in the Royal Navy, marrying first 1815 Henrietta Harrison (born c.1778; died July 1836) and second (1836) Mary Hathaway, the widow of Southwark merchant James Thomas Hathaway and eldest daughter of John Kennedy of Sutton Coldfield. He libelled the two trustees who were administering his meagre income by putting posters of their faces all over London; they took him to court and had the posters taken down. He unsuccessfully took a case to the KBD court and owed court costs of £30 which he was unable to pay; he spent 18 years of his life in prison. Sir Hugh died without issue at Forest Hill, London, on 28 August 1848, aged 79, and was buried on 9 September 1848, at Wotton, Surrey. On his death, the baronetcy became extinct. His widow, Mary, who was born at Hoxton in 1803, died on 5 May 1883, at Eagle House, in Forest Hill, and was buried in Nunhead Cemetery.

Baronetage of Great Britain
Preceded by John Evelyn	Baronet (of Wotton); 1833–1848	Extinct
