= Huxman =

Huxman is a family name. Notable people with the surname include:

- Susan Schultz Huxman, American academic administrator
- Travis Huxman, American plant physiological ecologist
- Walter A. Huxman (1887–1972), American judge and politician
