= Viscount Limerick =

Viscount Limerick may refer to two different viscountcies in the Peerage of Ireland:

- Viscount of [the City of] Limerick
  - created in 1719 for James Hamilton MP (1694–1758) who was made 1st Earl of Clanbrassil in 1756;
  - 1756–1758 courtesy title for his son James Hamilton (1730–1798), later the 2nd (and last) Earl of Clanbrassil
- Viscount Limerick
  - created in 1800 for Edmund Henry Pery, 2nd Baron Glentworth, who was made 1st Earl of Limerick in 1803;
  - although the Earl of Limerick's subsidiary titles are therefore Viscount Limerick and Baron Glentworth, his eldest son is in fact styled "Viscount Glentworth"
