= Evelyn Williams =

Evelyn Williams may refer to:

- Evelyn Williams (politician), member of the New Jersey General Assembly
- Evelyn Williams (artist) (1929–2012), British figurative artist
- Evelyn Williams, mistress of Elijah Muhammad
