= William Evelyn =

William Evelyn may refer to:

- William Evelyn (priest) (died 1776), Dean of Emly in Ireland
- William Evelyn (British Army officer) (1723–1783), British Lieutenant–General
- William Evelyn (died 1813), Member of Parliament for Hythe
- William John Evelyn (1822–1908), Member of Parliament for West Surrey and Deptford
- William Arthur Evelyn (1860–1935), historian of York
