= Ten Women of Stralsund =

Coordinates: 55.6889°N 12.5786°E

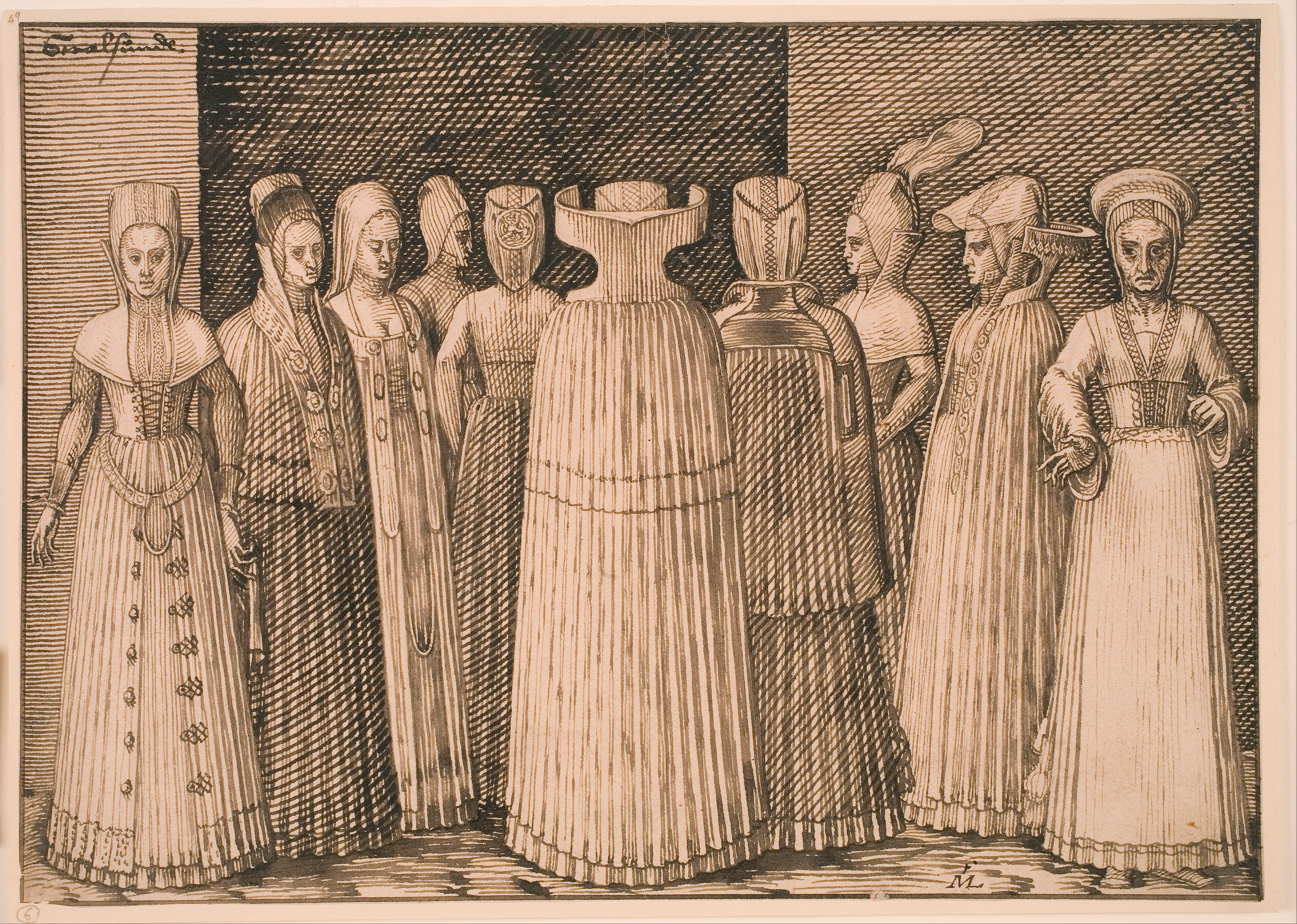
- Artist: Melchior Lorck
- Year: 1571
- Type: pencil drawing and brown ink on paper
- Dimensions: 22.2 cm × 31.3 cm (8.7 in × 12.3 in)
- Location: National Gallery of Denmark; Copenhagen

Ten women from Stralsund (in contemporary dress) is a pencil drawing in brown ink by Melchior Lorck from about 1571.

== Description ==
The dimensions are 22.2 x 31.3 cm.

The artwork is part of a series of drawings, which is believed to have served as sketches for woodcuts to illustrate a planned book on the history of clothing. It shows ten women, who are lined up and show off outfits from the 16th century. The women take different poses, and this allows Melchior Lorck to display their clothing from different angles.

== Provenance ==
The drawing was purchased with funds from the Konsul George Jorck and Wife Emma Jorck's Foundation from the Evelyn collection at auction at Sotheby's in March 1966. It is available now at National Gallery of Denmark in Copenhagen.
