= George Evelyn (1678–1724) =

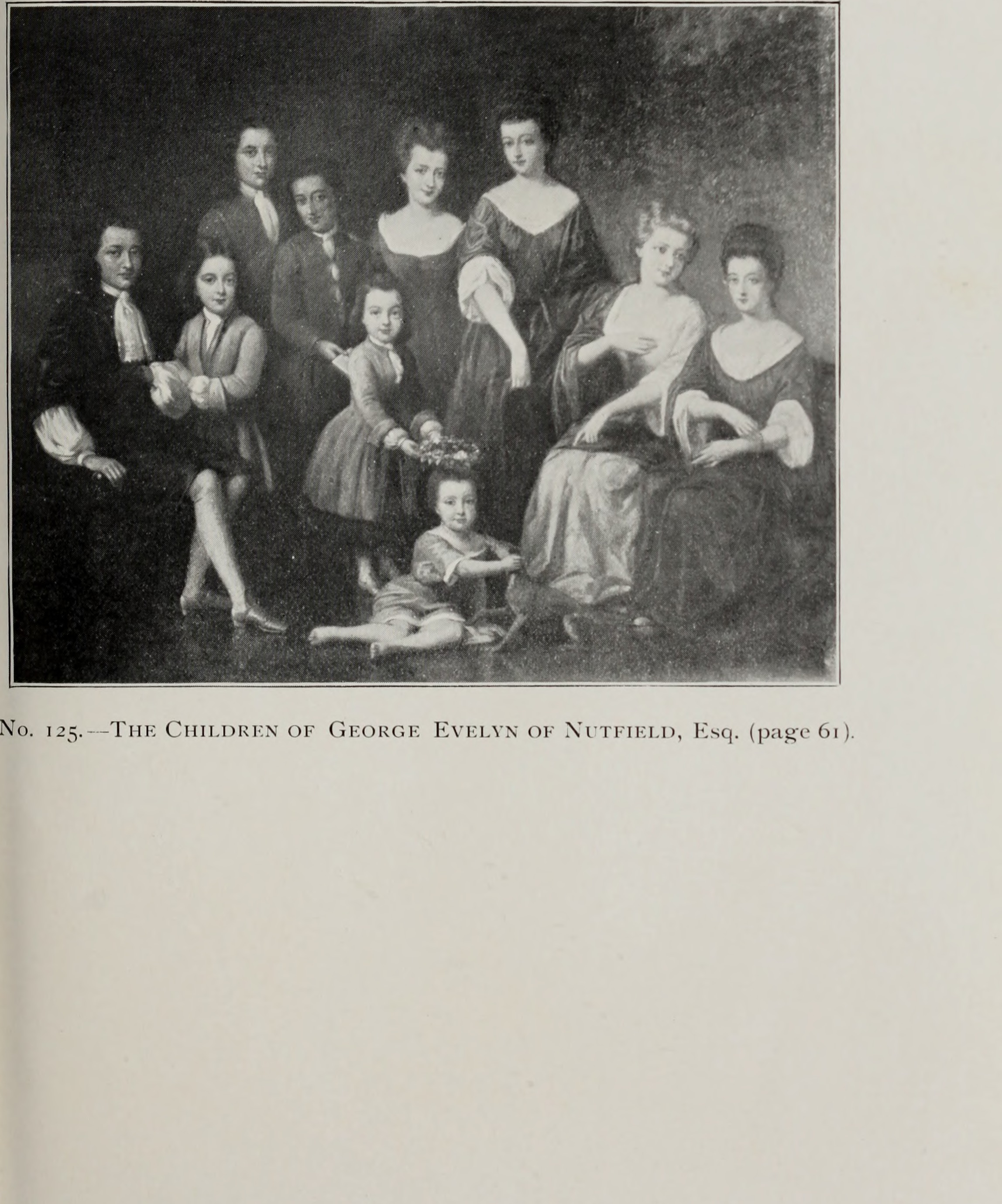
- George Evelyn and his family

Member of Parliament for Bletchingley
- In office 1705 – 18 October 1724

Personal details
- Born: 26 October 1678
- Died: 19 June 1699 (aged 20)
- Relations: Sir John Evelyn, 1st Baronet, of Godstone; William Glanville
- Parent: George Evelyn (1641–1699)

George Evelyn (26 October 1678 – 18 October 1724) was an English politician who served as a Member of Parliament (MP).

== Biography ==
Evelyn was the son of George Evelyn (1641–1699). His father, also of the same name, was also an MP.

== See also ==
- List of MPs elected in the 1710 British general election
- List of MPs elected in the 1713 British general election
- List of MPs elected in the 1715 British general election
- List of MPs elected in the 1722 British general election
