= 61 Micklegate =

Listed building in York, England

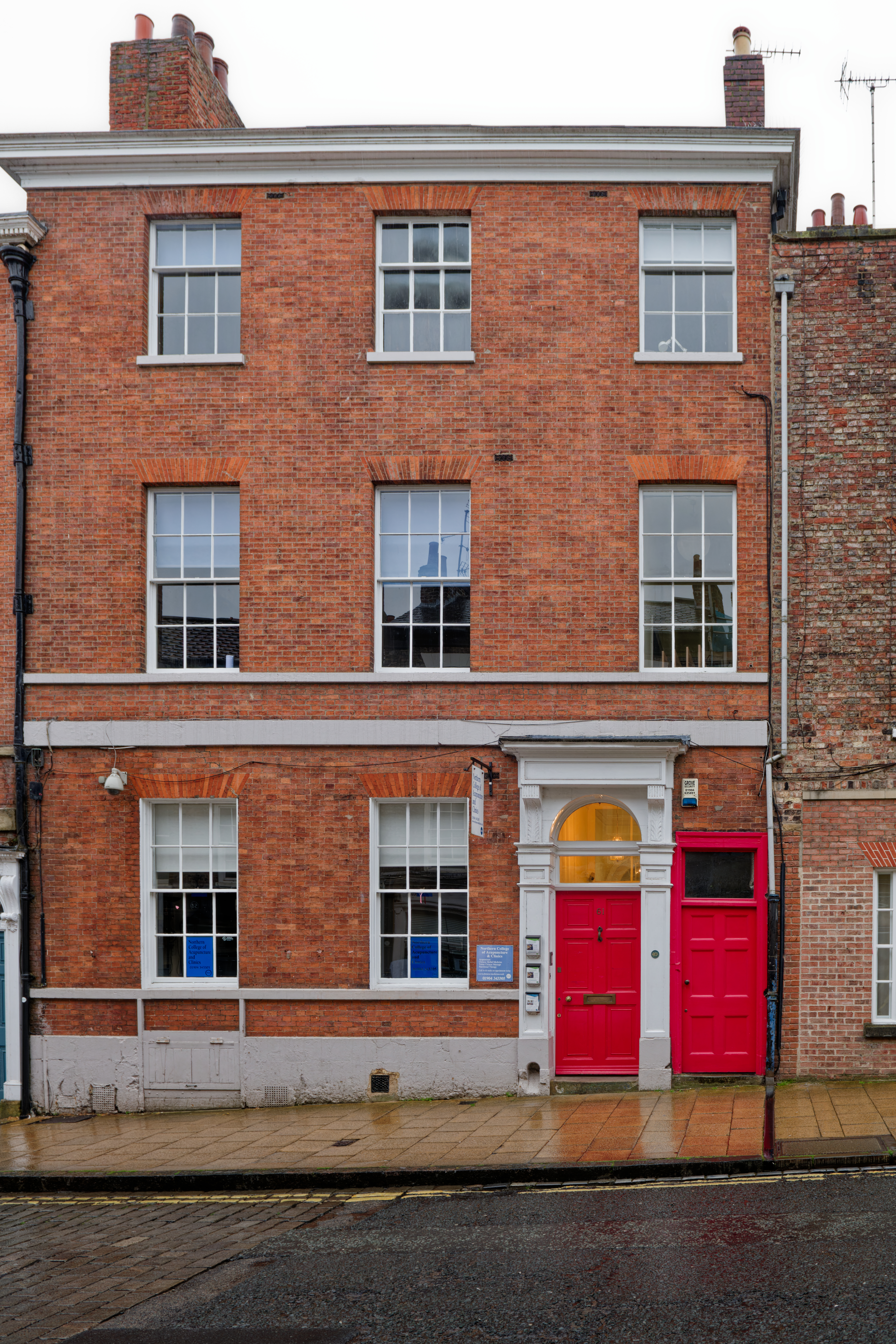
- The building in 2024
- Interactive map of the 61 Micklegate area
- Alternative names: Northern College of Acupuncture

General information
- Status: Converted to educational use
- Type: Townhouse (former)
- Location: Micklegate, York, England
- Coordinates: 53.9572°N 1.0880°W
- Current tenants: Northern College of Acupuncture
- Year built: c. 1786; 240 years ago
- Renovated: Mid-19th century (altered and extended)
- Client: George Telford
- Owner: York Conservation Trust

Design and construction
- Architect: Thomas Atkinson (probable)

Website
- nca.ac.uk

Listed Building – Grade II*
- Official name: 61, Micklegate
- Designated: 14 June 1954
- Reference no.: 1257344

61 Micklegate is a Grade II* listed building on Micklegate in the city of York, England. Built around 1786 as a townhouse, it follows the late‑18th‑century pattern seen at its neighbours, with later alterations including a mid‑19th‑century door surround and a southward extension. The house was occupied by members of the Telford family from 1786 to 1894, after which it was bought by the physician and antiquary William Arthur Evelyn. It was included in the Central Historic Core conservation area in 1968. The building stands between Grade II*-listed Nos. 57–59, and Nos. 63–65, listed at Grade II, and is now occupied by the Northern College of Acupuncture.

== History ==
Standing on Micklegate and built around 1786 as a townhouse, its three‑bay front and plan, with a transverse staircase between the front and back rooms, follow the pattern seen at the neighbouring Nos. 57–59, built in 1783. It is very likely that No. 61 was the work of the York architect Thomas Atkinson. Later alterations included a mid‑19th‑century door surround and a large single‑storey extension to the south. George Telford (1749–1834), from a family of York nurserymen, lived here from 1786 to 1809, and the freehold later passed to his grandson, Colonel Charles Telford, J.P., who occupied the house from 1876 until his death in 1894. It was then purchased by William Arthur Evelyn, a physician and antiquary.

On 14 June 1954, No. 61 was designated a Grade II* listed building, and in 1968 the site was included within the newly established Central Historic Core conservation area. It stands between Grade II*-listed Nos. 57–59, and Nos. 63–65, listed at Grade II.

The York Conservation Trust bought No. 61 in 1993. After a major refurbishment, which included adding a lift through three floors and building an extension at the rear, the building was leased to the Northern College of Acupuncture.

== Architecture ==
The front is built in red brick on a painted stone base, with contrasting brick and stone details, and timber door surrounds and cornice. The hipped slate roof has brick chimneys, and the building follows a typical town‑house layout. A service passage runs beside and parallel to the entrance passage, which is an unusual arrangement. The house has a basement and three storeys, with three windows across the front. A shuttered basement opening sits within the plinth. Near the right side is a door set in a panelled surround with a frieze and bracketed cornice, and a six‑panel door with a plain fanlight set back in a panelled recess. At the rear, a six‑panel door with an overlight provides access at the right end. Most windows are single‑pane sashes with flat brick arches, apart from a 12‑pane sash on the first floor to the right and a blind nine‑pane window in the centre of the second floor. The ground and first floors have sill bands, the second floor has painted stone sills, and a raised band marks the first‑floor level.

=== Interior ===
The basement contains brick‑vaulted cellars, including a back room with a kitchen range. On the ground floor, a round‑arched opening on panelled supports, now closed off by a later six‑panel door, once led into the stairhall. The main staircase is built around a circular well, with shaped stone steps and slender cast‑iron balusters supporting a swept handrail. A secondary stair, also cantilevered, rises around an oval well to the attic, with stone treads and a cast‑iron handrail. The front ground‑floor room keeps a fireplace decorated with applied ornament and a fluted shelf; the rear room has a semi-circular recess beneath a round arch carried on fluted pilasters.

On the first floor, a six‑panel door opens from the landing beneath a round arch, and the ceiling has a moulded cornice. The front room contains a 19th‑century fireplace with a shelf on carved brackets, set between round‑arched alcoves with damaged surrounds.

On the second floor, the stairwell has a moulded cornice below the roof light. In the rear left room is a simple moulded fireplace with a hob grate.

== See also ==
- Grade II* listed buildings in the City of York
- Listed buildings in York (within the city walls, southern part)
