= 57 and 59 Micklegate =

Listed building in York, England

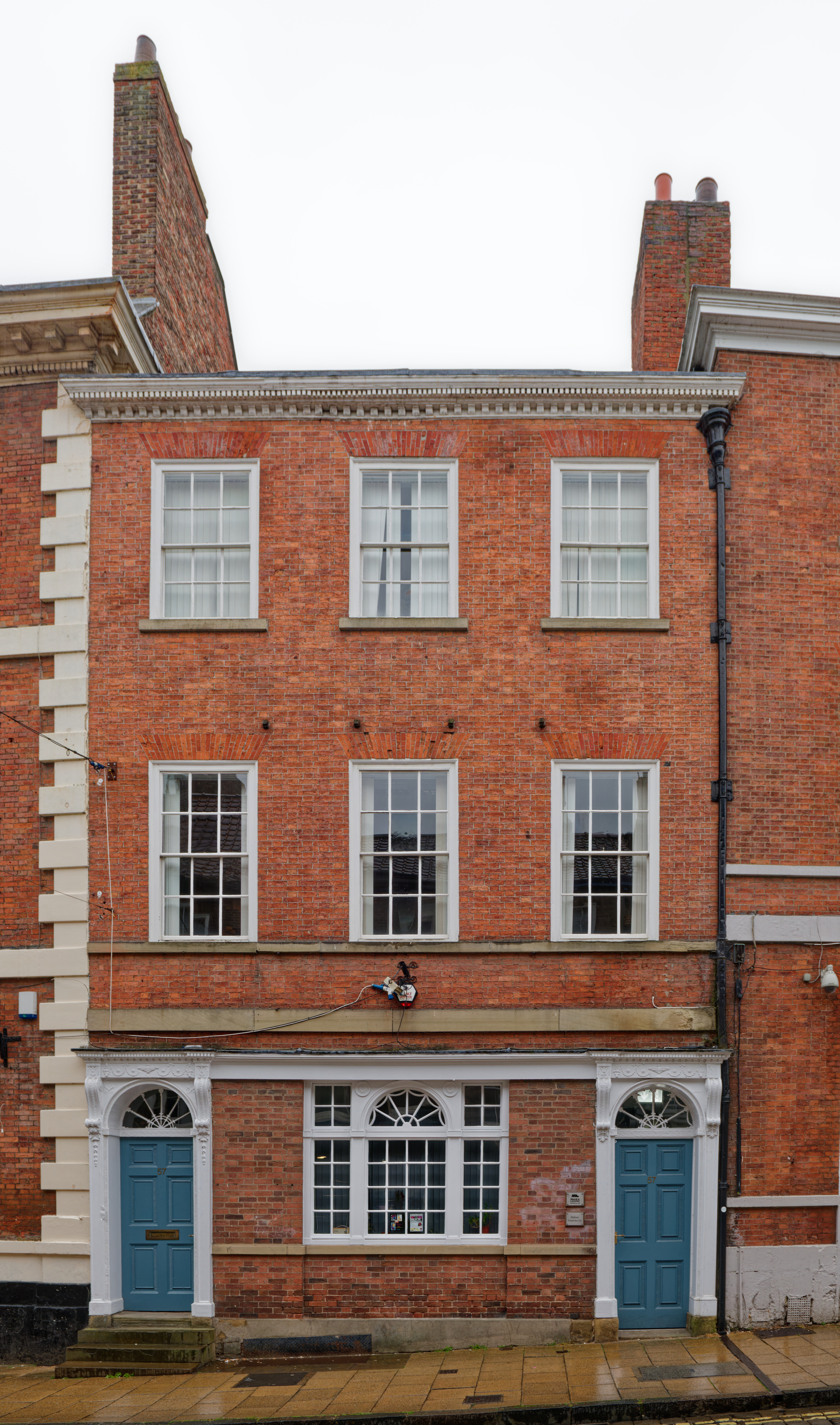
- The building in 2024
- Interactive map of the 57 and 59 Micklegate area

General information
- Status: Converted to commercial use
- Type: Townhouse (former)
- Location: Micklegate, York, England
- Coordinates: 53.9573°N 1.0880°W
- Year built: 1783; 243 years ago
- Renovated: 1946–47 (ground floor restored)

Listed Building – Grade II*
- Official name: 57 and 59, Micklegate
- Designated: 14 June 1954
- Reference no.: 1257340

57 and 59 Micklegate is a Grade II* listed building on Micklegate in the city of York, England. Built in 1783 as a townhouse, it was altered in 1946–47 when the ground floor was rebuilt but the original doorways were retained. The building was included in the Central Historic Core conservation area in 1968. It stands between Nos. 53 and 55 and No. 61, all Grade II*-listed, and is now occupied by a construction company.

== History ==
Standing on Micklegate, the townhouse was built in 1783, a date carried on a lead rainwater head on the rear elevation, consistent with its architectural character. By the late 18th century it was occupied by Robert Swann, a banker who moved to No. 128 in 1801, and was later the home of Mrs Susanna Wray (d. 1830), widow of the Rev. Henry Wray of Newton Kyme. The ground floor was rebuilt in 1946–47, according to the York Civic Trust, but both original doorways were retained.

On 14 June 1954, Nos. 57–59 were designated a Grade II* listed building, and in 1968 the site was included within the newly established Central Historic Core conservation area. It stands between Nos. 53–55 and No. 61, all Grade II*-listed. The building is now occupied by a construction company.

== Architecture ==
The front is built of orange‑red brick with stone bands above a stone basement, with timber doorcases and a timber cornice at the eaves. The slate roof is hipped and has brick chimney stacks. The building follows a town‑house layout and includes a side passage for services.

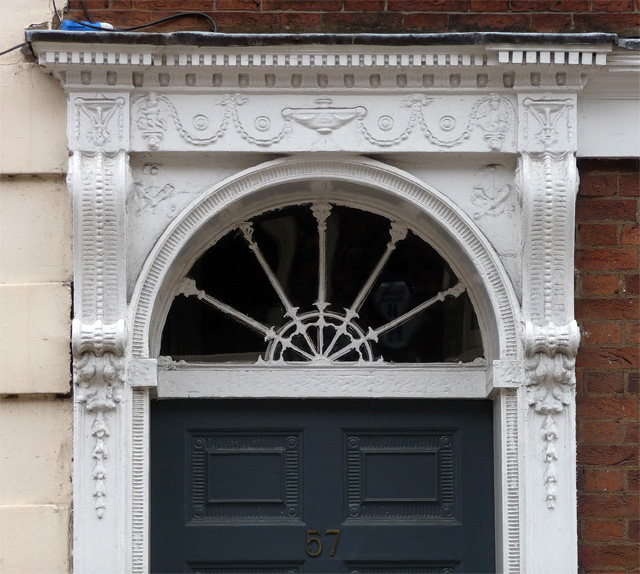
Detail above a doorway

It has a basement and three storeys, with three windows across the front. Each end has a doorway framed by panelled pilasters, a moulded frieze and a dentilled cornice on scroll‑shaped brackets; the left doorway also has a wheatear ornament. Both doors have six panels and patterned fanlights set within round‑arched surrounds. The doorway entablature continues across the ground floor as a plain band above a mid‑20th‑century reproduction of a Venetian window with small‑pane glazing.

The upper floors have 12‑pane sash windows set beneath flat brick arches, with a sill band at first‑floor level and stone sills on the second floor. A raised band marks the first floor. At the right end of the eaves is an inverted bell‑shaped rainwater head with decorative clamps.

At the rear, the first and second‑floor windows have shallow arched heads. A brick dentil band runs along the eaves, and a dated rainwater head carries the initials "WA".

=== Interior ===
The entrance and service passages are paved with stone flags. Two round arches, set on pilasters with simple panelled faces and moulded details, mark the division between the entrance passage and the stairhall. The rebuilt staircase rises from the ground floor to the second floor; it has an open string, slim turned balusters set in pairs on each step, and a shaped handrail that sweeps up from a column‑like newel on a curved lower step. An added elliptical arch leads into the front room, which has a cornice and an original fireplace with panelled jambs, a moulded shelf, decorative milling, a frieze with festoons and arabesques, and a cast‑iron grate. The rear room contains two later elliptical arches and a dentilled cornice.

The front room on the first floor has moulded skirting, a dado rail with milled ornament, and a cornice. Door and window surrounds have moulded and milled decoration, and the window reveals include sunk panels with applied foliate ornament. The fireplace has fluted pilaster jambs, a milled architrave, a frieze decorated with garlands and small figures in applied composition, and a moulded shelf. The rear room has a fireplace with panelled jambs with lion masks and pendant mouldings, a beaded and fluted frieze, and a moulded shelf.

The second floor stairwell has a dentilled cornice beneath a coved ceiling with a top light. Simple continuous round arches lead to the front and back rooms.

== See also ==
- Grade II* listed buildings in the City of York
- Listed buildings in York (within the city walls, southern part)
