= George Evelyn (1641–1699) =

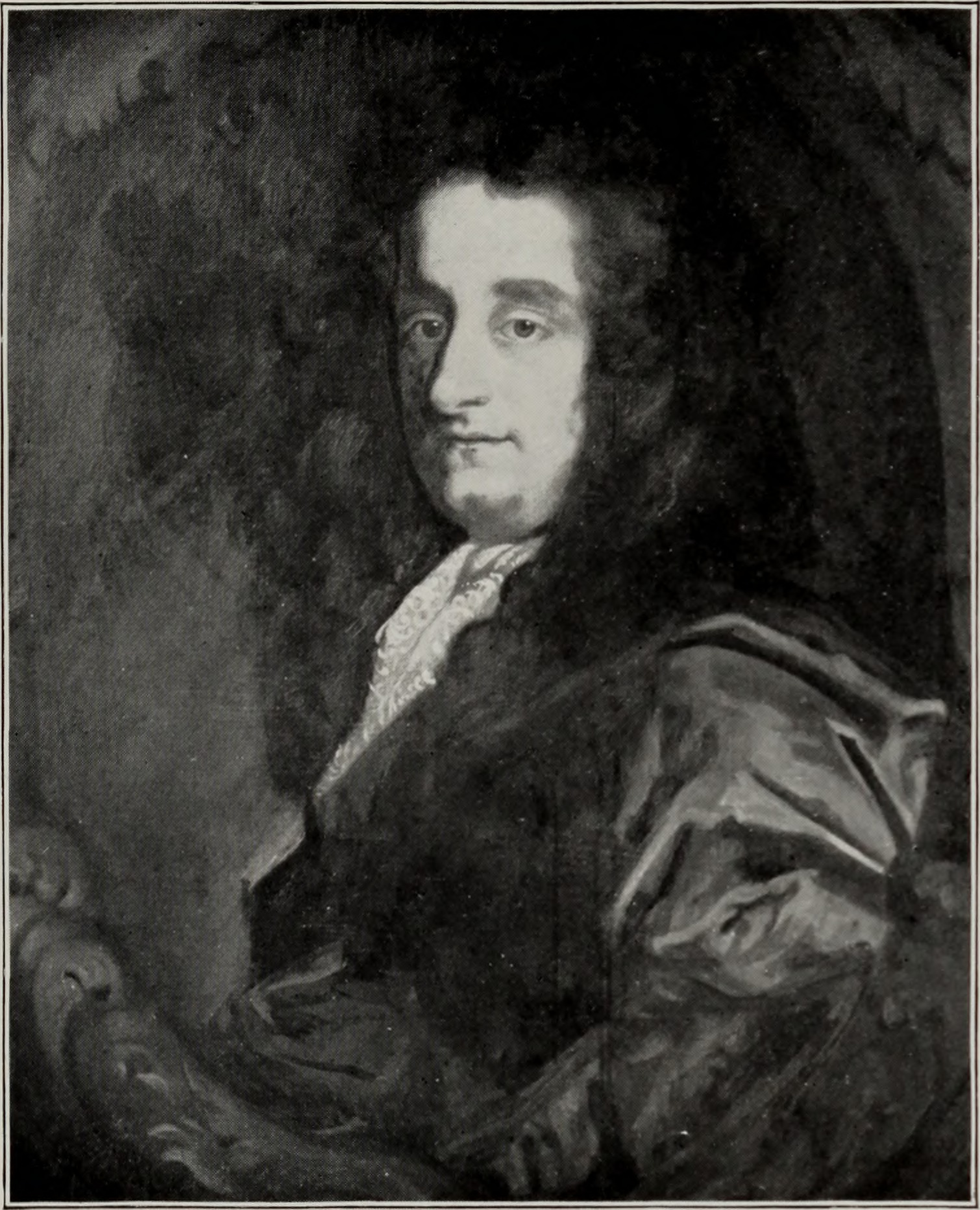

Member of the Parliament of England for Bletchingley
- In office 1679–1681

Member of the Parliament of England for Gatton
- In office 1696–1698

Personal details
- Born: 4 December 1641
- Died: 19 June 1699 (aged 57)
- Relations: Sir John Evelyn, 1st Baronet, of Godstone
- Children: George Evelyn (1678–1724); William Glanville

George Evelyn (20 December 1745 – 28 December 1805) was an English politician who served as a Member of Parliament (MP).

== Biography ==
Evelyn was the son of John Evelyn (1591–1664). His son, also of the same name, was also an MP.
