= Francis Owen (politician) =

British politician

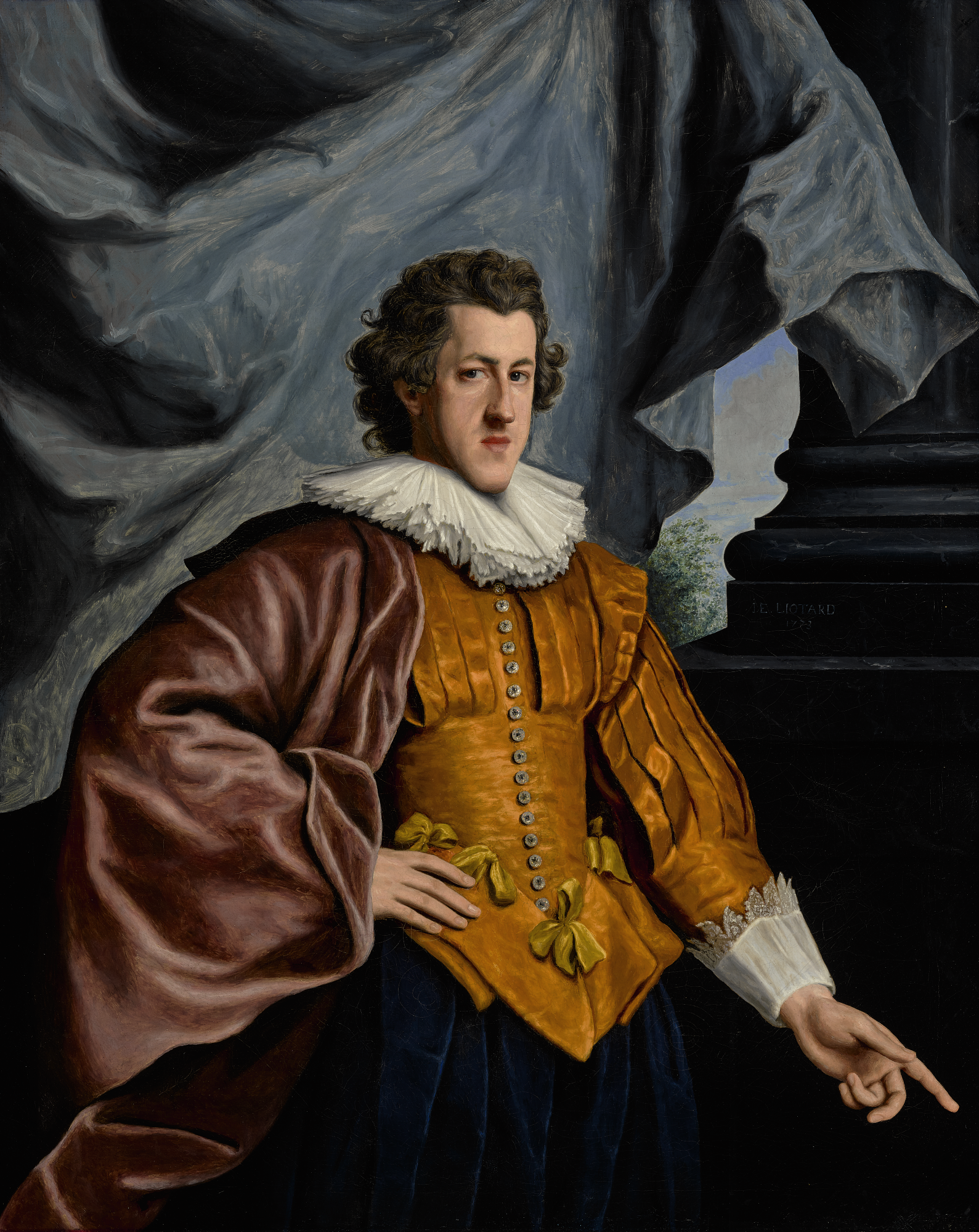
portrait by Jean-Étienne Liotard

Francis Owen (1745–1774) was a British politician who was elected to the House of Commons in 1774 but was killed in an accident before Parliament met.

Owen was the younger son of William Owen of Porkington Selattyn, Shropshire and his wife Mary Godolphin, daughter of Rev. Henry Godolphin, Dean of St. Paul's and was baptized on 24 February 1745. His uncle Francis Godolphin, 2nd Baron Godolphin was MP for Helston. Owen was educated at Eton College in 1756, and matriculated at Pembroke College, Oxford in 1764. In the early 1770s The Swiss-French painter Jean-Étienne Liotard visited England when one of his patrons was James Hamilton, 2nd Earl of Clanbrassil. Clanbrassil was connected with the Godolphin family and was MP for Helston. Liotard painted a portrait of Clanbrassil and subsequently in 1773 a portrait of Owen, dressed in 17th century costume.

At the 1774 general election Owen stood for Helston on the Godolphin interest and was elected as Member of Parliament after a contest. However, before Parliament met, he was killed by a fall from his horse on 16 November 1774 when a bridge at Walton Derbyshire, which he was riding over, collapsed. He was unmarried.

== Sources ==
- Lowell Libson Portrait of Francis Owen by Jean-Étienne Liotard 1773

Parliament of Great Britain
| Preceded by Earl of Clanbrassil; William Evelyn | Member of Parliament for Helston; 1774–1775; With: Marquess of Carmarthen | Succeeded by Francis Cust; Philip Yorke |
