= Evelyn Valdez-Ward =

Scientist and immigration activist

Evelyn Valdez-Ward is a scientist, science communicator, adjunct professor, and immigration activist living in the US. She is known for her activism related to DACA as a formerly undocumented scientist. Valdez-Ward has published articles advocating for social justice and immigration rights in the sciences in journals including Science, Scientific American, and Proceedings of the National Academy of Sciences.

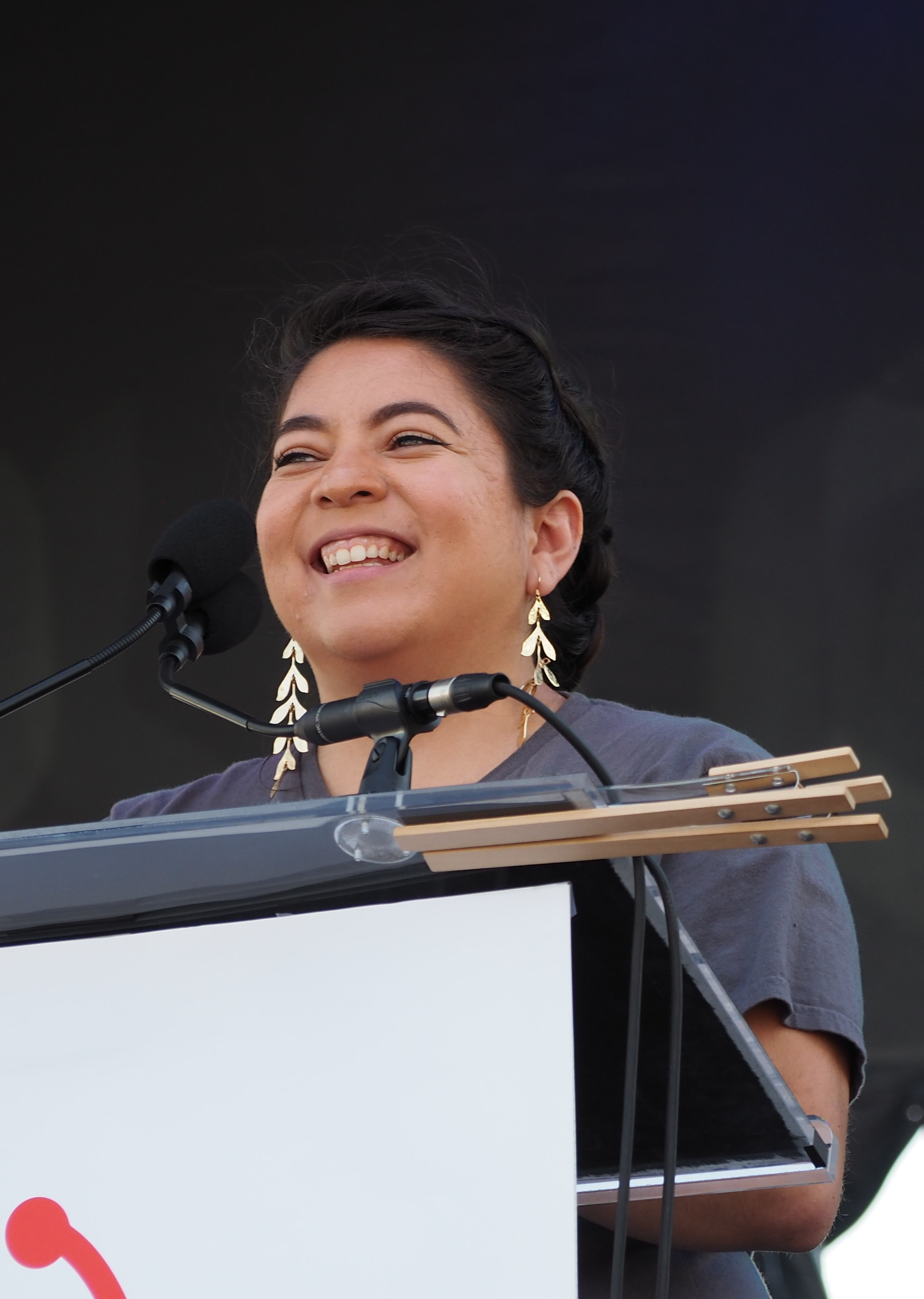
Valdez-Ward speaking at the March for Science

== Education ==
Valdez-Ward is a Postdoctoral Scholar in the Metcalf Institute at the University of Rhode Island. She is currently developing a training curriculum and evaluation for faculty of color in science communication on Metcalf's newest initiative, the SciComm Identities Project, in collaboration with the Michigan State University Knight Center for Environmental Journalism.

Valdez-Ward obtained an M.S. and a Ph.D. in Ecology and Evolutionary Biology at the University of California, Irvine, in 2022. Her doctoral dissertation research focused on the impact of California's drought on interactions between plants and soil microbes, as well as on how to create inclusive communities in the field of science communication. Her doctoral research was advised by Kathleen Treseder and Travis Huxman.

== Scientific career ==
Valdez-Ward is a co-founder and executive director of the Reclaiming STEM Institute, a science communication and science policy training workshop and lecture series founded in 2018. The institute aims to build community, capacity, and power for and with scientists across diverse and historically marginalized communities. The goal of the workshops is to help scientists learn to use STEM for social justice. Reclaiming STEM has been partially funded by a grant from the American Geophysical Union.

Evelyn Valdez-Ward has also worked as an adjunct professor at California State University, Dominguez Hills, Santa Ana College, and Chapman University since 2019, after participating in the California Community College Internship Program. She teaches courses on topics including global climate change, plant biology, and introductory biology.

== Immigration Activism ==
Valdez-Ward advocates for DACA and improved rights for undocumented people in the US, especially scientists. She was a DACA recipient and was born in Mexico City. She learned that she was undocumented while applying for college. As a graduate student at the University of California, she was one of ten UC students and alumni who were featured in a documentary about being undocumented, which was part of a federal lawsuit to maintain DACA. She argues that DACA and immigration are science issues. In January 2020, Valdez-Ward became a legal permanent resident.

Valdez-Ward was also a speaker at the 2018 March for Science in Washington, D.C. In 2018, she was named a Science Defender by the Union of Concerned Scientists because of her activism.

== Honors and awards ==
- Switzer Foundation Fellowship, 2020-2021
- Mass Media Fellowship, American Association for the Advancement of Science, 2020
- Annual List Of 50 Fixers, Grist 50, 2020
- Science Communication Best in Practice Award, Ecological Society of America, 2020
- Diversity Fellowship, National Association of Science Writers, 2020
- Latino Excellence and Achievement Reward for Excellence in Research
- Ford Foundation Predoctoral Fellowship, 2016-2019
- Dynamic Womxn's Award for Outstanding Social Justice Activism, UC Irvine, 2018
- Science Defender, Union of Concerned Scientists, 2018
- Eugene Cota-Robles Fellowship, UC Irvine, 2016
