= John Evelyn (1677–1702) =

English politician

John Evelyn (3 October 1677 – 13 November 1702) was an English politician. A member of a prominent Surrey family, his career in Parliament was cut short after a few months by his premature death from smallpox.

John was the eldest son of George Evelyn, of Godstone, and of his second wife Margaret Webb. He succeeded his father in the Godstone estate in 1699. On 5 May 1701, he obtained a marriage license with Ann Glynne, the daughter of John Glynne and granddaughter of the judge John Glynne, but the marriage does not appear ever to have been carried out.

At the 1702 election he was returned unopposed at Bletchingley, where his father and grandfather had previously sat. On his journey to take his seat, he visited his second cousin once removed, the diarist John Evelyn, at Wotton, Surrey; the latter referred to him as "a young and very hopeful gentleman". Soon after the opening of Parliament, Evelyn contracted smallpox, and died on 13 November. His entailed estates passed to his brother George. John is believed to have been a Whig, but his short tenure in Parliament precludes a positive identification.

Parliament of England
Preceded by Sir Edward Gresham; John Ward	Member of Parliament for Bletchingley; 1702; With: John Ward	Succeeded by John Ward; Sir Robert Clayton
