= 53 and 55 Micklegate =

Listed building in York, England

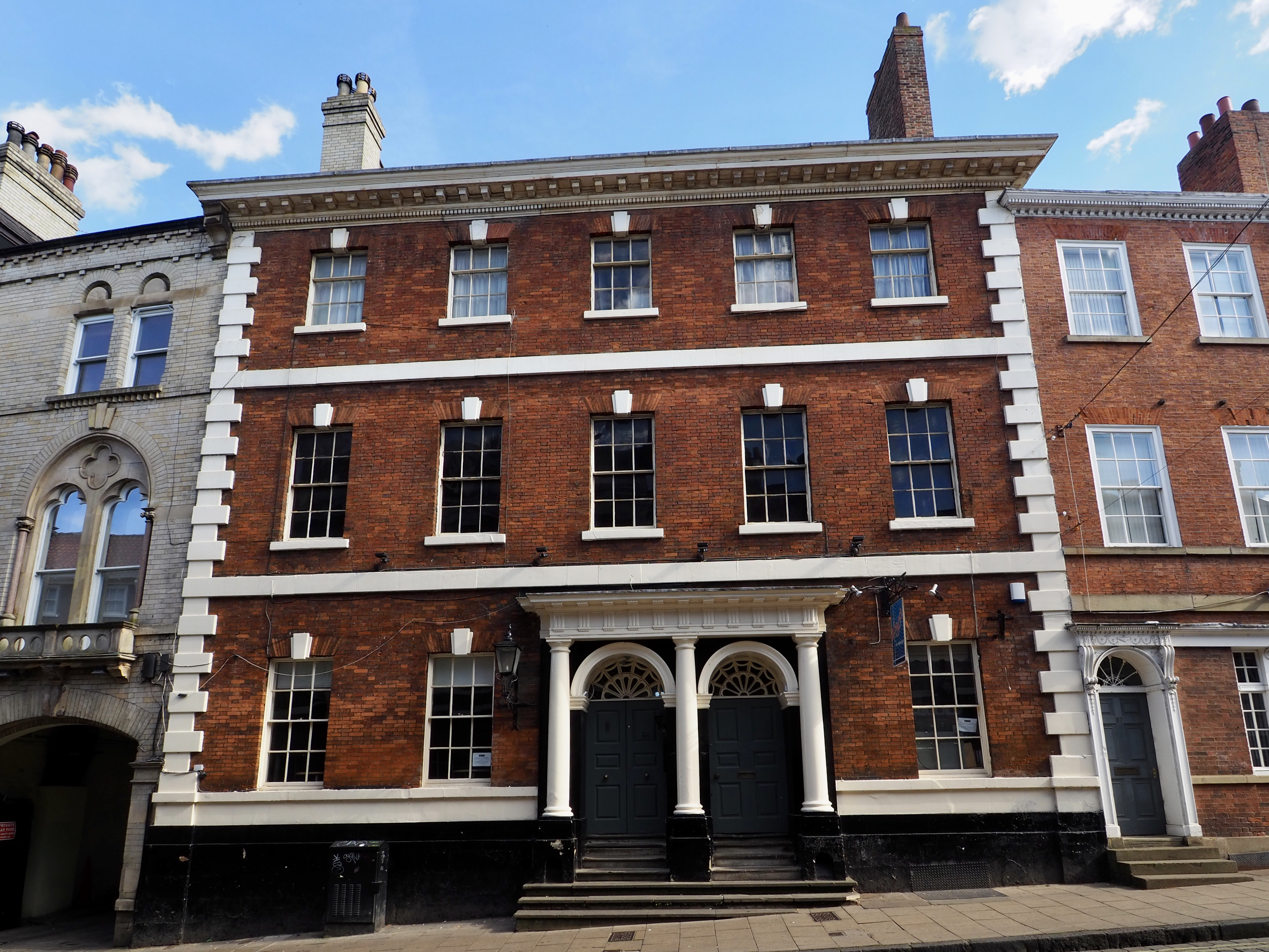
- The building in 2022
- Alternative names: Ziggy's

General information
- Status: Converted to bar and nightclub
- Type: Townhouse (former)
- Location: Micklegate, York, England
- Coordinates: 53.9571°N 1.0884°W
- Year built: 1751; 275 years ago
- Renovated: c. 1813 (subdivided, altered and second doorcase added); 20th century (consolidated); 1970 (stairhall ceiling renewed)

Design and construction
- Architect: John Carr (possible)

Website
- ziggysyork.co.uk

Listed Building – Grade II*
- Official name: 53 and 55, Micklegate
- Designated: 14 June 1954
- Reference no.: 1257333

53 and 55 Micklegate is a Grade II* listed building on Micklegate in York, England. Built in 1751 and possibly designed by John Carr, it was home in the late 18th century to Lady Dawes and Paul Beilby Thompson, and later to the Countess of Conyngham. The house was divided and altered around 1813 and used for commercial and institutional purposes through the Victorian and Edwardian periods before returning to single occupancy in the 20th century. It stands between the Grade II-listed Artful Dodger public house and the Grade II*‑listed Nos. 57–59, and is now occupied by Ziggy's bar and nightclub.

== History ==
Standing on Micklegate, the house was built in 1751 and the design may be by John Carr, as several details resemble those of other houses associated with him on Micklegate and Castlegate. By the late 18th century the property was the home of Lady Dawes and her husband Paul Beilby Thompson, and in 1806 it was advertised as the former residence of the Countess of Conyngham, with extensive stabling. Around 1813 the house was divided into two and altered, with a second doorway added. From the mid‑19th century No. 53 was occupied by people connected with the neighbouring wine and spirit merchants, while No. 55 housed Inland Revenue offices and other government departments before becoming a girls' school after 1905. It returned to single occupancy in the 20th century, and the stairhall ceiling was renewed in 1970.

On 14 June 1954, Nos. 53–55 were designated a Grade II* listed building, and in 1968 the site was included within the newly established Central Historic Core conservation area. It stands between the Grade II-listed Artful Dodger public house and the Grade II*-listed Nos. 57–59. Nos. 53–55 are now occupied by Ziggy's bar and nightclub.

== Architecture ==
The front is built of orange‑red brick on a painted stone base, with painted stone quoins and window surrounds. The original stone doorcase now includes an added timber column, and the timber cornice has dentil and modillion detailing. The rear is of buff‑red brick with red brick surrounds. The roof has two spans, slate to the front and tile to the rear, with shaped gable ends.

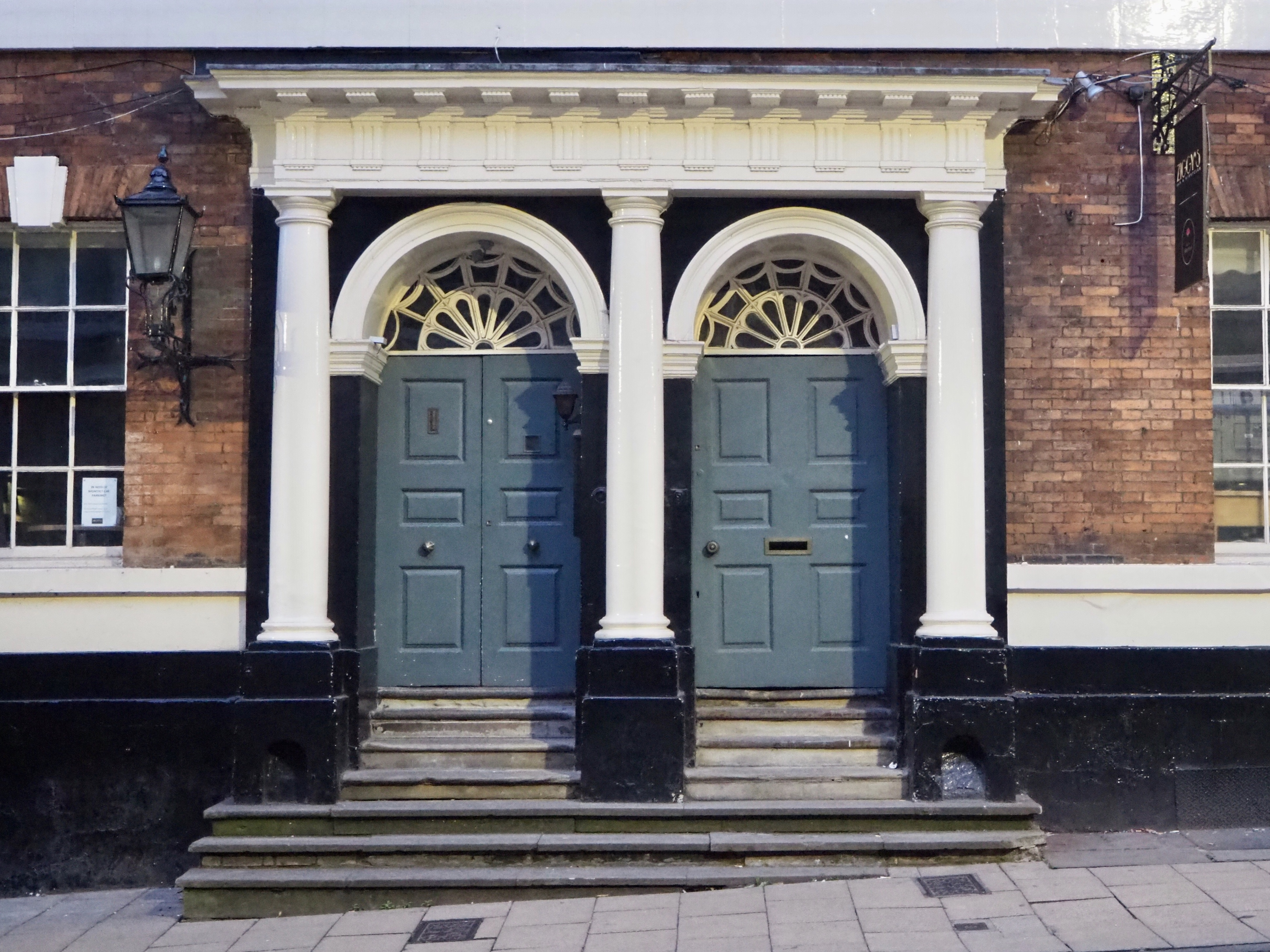
The building's double doorway

The house originally had a central entrance hall, but a second doorway was later formed from an earlier window opening. It has a basement and three storeys, with five windows across the front. Steps lead up to a double doorway framed by three Tuscan columns, a frieze with triglyphs, and a projecting cornice; each door has six panels and a radial fanlight set in a round‑arched surround. The ground and first floors have 12‑pane sash windows, and the top floor has unequal 9‑pane sashes, all set beneath flat brick arches with three keystones. A band at plinth level forms the sills to the ground‑floor windows, and the upper windows have painted stone sills, with raised brick bands marking the first and second floors.

At the rear, later additions obscure the ground floor. A staircase window with radial glazing sits at first‑floor level beneath a round brick arch with moulded imposts. Raised brick bands mark the upper floors, and the eaves have a moulded cornice. The rainwater goods at the right end are dated and have decorative clamps.

=== Interior ===
There are extensive cellars running beneath the whole building. The ground floor retains its original entrance hall with moulded joinery and a decorative cornice, and a round arch leads into the stairhall, where similar detailing continues. The main staircase has an open string, varied balusters and a shaped handrail that curves around the newel at the foot, lit by a large arched window. The front room is fitted with raised panelling and a cornice, with moulded door and window surrounds, shutters, and an ornate chimneypiece with a pedimented overmantel. The back room has simpler panelling and a mid‑19th‑century fireplace.

A round arch at the rear of the later entrance to No. 55 leads to the original secondary staircase, which has a closed string, turned balusters and square newels. The front room off the entrance passage has a fireplace with fluted jambs and fitted cupboards with decorative roundels, panelled window reveals and a dentil cornice.

On the first floor, the upper stairwell has panelling and a renewed Rococo ceiling with a cornice. The lobby to the main reception room is framed by an Ionic archway with flanking blind arches, and the room itself has moulded window surrounds with lion‑mask ornaments and two fireplaces with carved detailing. The rear room has panelled walls and a fireplace with a pulvinated frieze. The altered secondary staircase continues to the attics, which have gypsum plaster floors.

== See also ==
- Grade II* listed buildings in the City of York
- Listed buildings in York (within the city walls, southern part)
