= Francis Evelyn =

Welsh cricketer (1859–1910)

Personal information
- Full name: Francis Lyndon Evelyn
- Born: 24 May 1859; Presteigne, Radnorshire, Wales
- Died: 8 December 1910 (aged 51); Kinsham, Herefordshire, England
- Batting: Right-handed

Domestic team information
- Years: Team
- 1880–1881: Oxford University

Career statistics
| Competition | First-class |
|---|---|
| Matches | 5 |
| Runs scored | 33 |
| Batting average | 3.30 |
| 100s/50s | –/– |
| Top score | 10 |
| Catches/stumpings | 1/– |
- Source: Cricinfo, 2 March 2020

Francis Lyndon Evelyn JP DL (24 May 1859 – 8 December 1910) was a Welsh first-class cricketer.

The son of Francis Evelyn senior, he was born at Presteigne in May 1859. He was educated at Rugby School, before going up to Oriel College, Oxford. While studying at Oxford, he played first-class cricket for Oxford University in 1880 and 1881, making five appearances. He struggled as a batsman in his five matches, scoring just 33 runs with a high score of 10.

After graduating from Oxford, Evelyn was commissioned into the Herefordshire Light Infantry as a second lieutenant in December 1880. By 1884, he was serving in the Shropshire Light Infantry as a lieutenant, resigning his commission in April 1884. Evelyn served as a deputy lieutenant for Herefordshire in 1885, before serving as the High Sheriff of Radnorshire in 1887. He also served as a justice of the peace for Radnorshire. Evelyn died in December 1910 at Kinsham, Herefordshire. His youngest brother was the Welsh football international Edward Evelyn, while his middle brother was the historian William Arthur Evelyn.
