= Yorkshire Architectural and York Archaeological Society =

Yorkshire historical society

The Yorkshire Architectural and York Archaeological Society (Y.A.Y.A.S.) is a learned society formed in 1842 as the Yorkshire Architectural Society. Its membership was made up of clergymen and laymen led by Rev. George Ayliffe Poole from Leeds. Its main objectives were the study of ecclesiastical architecture and design, and the restoration of churches within Yorkshire; it also intended to promote improvements in the design of future ecclesiastical buildings.

== History ==
The first annual general meeting was held in the De Grey Rooms, York on 7 October 1842. Rev. George Ayliffe Poole took the role of secretary while Richard Bethell became the society's chair. The society planned to meet twice a year for general business and the reading of papers, which it would publish if of sufficient interest. Over three hundred members joined before the first meeting. The donation of books, plans and drawings from members was encouraged to form a society museum and library. A permanent room in Minster Yard housed the museum, library and meeting room from June 1844 until 1857, when these moved to the York School of Art.

On 8 April 1845 the first society excursion was organised to Adel church. The annual outing became a feature of the society.

In 1850 the society adopted a seal, designed by a member, John West Hugall, showing a standing figure of St Wilfrid.

The preservation of secular buildings, although not an original aim of the society, took up an increasingly large proportion of its time and energy from the mid-1850s. Members were involved in several campaigns in York. In 1855 they petitioned to save York city walls from demolition, and, in 1859, the society was involved in a campaign to preserve the barbican at Walmgate Bar.

Membership gradually declined through the mid-19th century. Committee meetings became infrequent, the presentation of papers ceased and few grants were given out for church restoration. In 1884 the society, together with its books and artefacts, moved to York Minster Library. Its plaster casts of architectural details were donated to the York School of Art, which had housed the society for several years.

The society underwent a revival in 1902, widening its objectives to cover archaeological research in York. It was renamed the Yorkshire Architectural and York Archaeological Society (Y.A.Y.A.S.). Lecture and excursion programmes were reinstated and, in June 1902, Dr William A. Evelyn, who was to become a driving force in the conservation of York's buildings and city walls, joined the society. In 1906 the society and its library moved to Jacob's Well which it quickly outgrew, then moving to the Yorkshire Philosophical Society building.

From 1948 to 1953–54 the society produced an Annual Report and Summary of Proceedings, which contain articles on York architecture and archaeology. A programme of lectures, excursions and publications was also reinstated. From 1956, Y.A.Y.A.S. meetings and lectures were held in various venues across the city. The Yorkshire Philosophical Society continued to house the Y.A.Y.A.S. library until 1963, when it was moved to York Library. In 1974 the society's library was sold with the proceeds going towards the production of future publications.

York Historian was first published in 1976 and is an annual volume of York-centred historical research. Y.A.Y.A.S. Times, a newsletter for members, first appeared in November 1980. As of 2022, both publications continue. The society is now a charity with the aim: “To advance the education of the public in the architectural, historical and archaeological heritage in the historic county of Yorkshire and the City of York."

In 1931 William A. Evelyn sold his collection of paintings and drawings of York (now known as the Evelyn collection) to the city to be housed in York Art Gallery. His collection of glass lantern slides, and lecture notes was given to Y.A.Y.A.S. The collection is currently housed in York Minster Library and is in the care of the Y.A.Y.A.S. Keeper of the Evelyn Collection.

As of 2022, the society is still active in York and undertakes a wide range of lectures and excursions to stimulate interest and research in the city's historic environment. Every year it produces the journal York Historian, which includes original research on the history, archaeology and architecture of York. (Note: See "York Historian". Yorkshire Architectural and York Archaeological Society. This has ISSN 0309-3743. It should not be confused with a separate magazine titled The York Historian, produced by students at University of York, for which see its website.)
