= 45–49 Micklegate and 1 St Martin's Lane =

Listed terrace in York, England

- The terrace in 2022
- Former names: Walker's Bar (Nos. 47 and 49)
- Alternative names: The Artful Dodger (Nos. 47 and 49)

General information
- Type: Public house and houses; originally shops, offices and pub
- Location: Micklegate and St Martin's Lane, York, England
- Coordinates: 53.9573°N 1.0876°W
- Year built: Mid-19th century
- Renovated: 2010 (restored); 2018 (Nos. 47 and 49 refenestrated)

Design and construction
- Designations

Listed Building – Grade II
- Official name: St Martins House Walkers Bar (numbers 47 and 49) and yard wall attached to number 1 St Martins Lane
- Designated: 24 June 1983
- Reference no.: 1257330

45–49 Micklegate and 1 St Martin's Lane is a Grade II listed mid‑19th‑century terrace on Micklegate and St Martin's Lane in York, England. Originally built for shops, offices and a public house, the range includes No. 45, historically part of St Martin's House and now an eight‑bedroom HMO, and Nos. 47 and 49 which form the Micklegate frontage that has long housed a pub and is now occupied by The Artful Dodger, while St Martin's House at No. 1 St Martin's Lane is a private dwelling.

== History ==
The terrace, which mainly stands on Micklegate, comprises Nos. 45–49, with No. 1 St Martin's Lane forming the corner section; No. 45 was historically part of St Martin's House. At the time of listing, Walker's Bar occupied Nos. 47 and 49. The range was originally built in the mid‑19th century for use as shops, offices and a public house.

The 1885 directory for York lists the Prudential Assurance Company office at St Martin's House, with J. H. Taylor as superintendent; the hair cutter Thomas J. Morrod at No. 47; and Miss Mary Pearson and Mrs E. Tinker at No. 49, then a "young ladies' seminary". The 1891 Ordnance Survey map shows St Martin's House occupied what is now No. 45 Micklegate and 1 St Martin's Lane. The 1913 Kelly's Directory of the North and East Ridings of Yorkshire records Luke Dennison at No. 45, then a temperance hotel; Alfred Jesper, a colliery agent and collector, at No. 47; and the wine and spirit merchants Walker & Scott at No. 49. At No. 1 are William Page & Son, corn merchants within St Martin's House, together with the architect Thomas Monkman, the artist Arthur William Turner, and Anthony Holgate at the Minster temperance hotel.

Pub sign in 2018

In 1968 the site was included within the newly established Central Historic Core conservation area, and on 24 June 1983 the terrace was designated a Grade II listed building. Although the statutory listing refers only to Nos. 45–49 Micklegate, later administrative and commercial records describe the section occupied by the pub as Nos. 47–51 Micklegate, reflecting a modern address applied to part of the same block after internal changes allowed it to operate as a single premises. The terrace stands beside Nos. 53 and 55, a mid-18th-century building on Micklegate listed at Grade II*, and the Grade II listed Nos. 2–7, a terrace on St Martin's Lane.

Because the building had been owned for many years by Scottish & Newcastle, its condition reflected the uneven upkeep typical of leased pubs. The ground‑floor bar areas were kept in reasonable order, while the second‑floor rooms were maintained only enough to remain usable. The first floor, which had no commercial purpose, had received virtually no attention since the 1970s, when the property was last privately owned. Work was carried out in 2010 to repair and restore the building, and in 2018 permission was granted to restore the windows and replace damaged panes with double‑glazed units for the pub.

No. 45 forms a separate part of the terrace and is now an eight‑bedroom HMO. The ground floors of Nos. 47 and 49 operate as a single pub trading as The Artful Dodger, previously known as Walker's Bar for many years. The venue functions as an alternative music and rock bar and includes an upstairs room used for small acoustic performances. As of July 2025 the freehold is independently owned. No. 1 St Martin's Lane is a private dwelling.

== Architecture ==
The building is of pale cream brick laid in a regular pattern, with some sections finished with a shaped cornice. Stone is used for the main decorative details, and the roof is slated with brick chimneys. Three dormers rise from the roof, each with a rounded window; one has been replaced in the 20th century for the pub.

Micklegate frontage in 2025

It has three storeys with cellars and attics. The front to Micklegate has four bays, the front to St Martin's Lane has three, and the corner is curved.

On Micklegate, the cellar has paired windows set beneath a single heavy lintel. The entrances to Nos. 45 and 47 are reached by steps and set back to the right of paired sash windows. The ground‑floor openings have rounded heads with simple decorative blocks and bands, carried on slender shafts with carved tops. The pub windows have flattened pointed heads with grouped decorative blocks and a similar centre shaft. At the right end is a wide arched opening for vehicles.

The first floor has paired windows with small trefoil heads set back beneath pointed arches, with blind circular decoration above, carried on jamb shafts with carved tops. The arches have grouped decorative blocks. The window sills rest on brackets and support low parapets with round openings.

The second floor has paired square‑headed windows with chamfered lintels that continue across the front as a band, forming the base for shallow relieving arches. A row of small brick projections runs beneath the stone sills. All windows throughout are single‑pane sashes.

On St Martin's Lane, the centre doorway has a rounded head beneath a projecting hood supported on corbels. Steps lead up to a panelled door with a fanlight. Other details match those on Micklegate, except that the centre windows are single rather than paired, and the first‑floor window has a taller arch with a trefoil in the panel above. The same pattern appears on the curved corner, where the windows are narrower and the first‑floor one again has a trefoil in the panel above.

== See also ==
- Listed buildings in York (within the city walls, southern part)
