= Sir John Evelyn, 4th Baronet =

British aristocrat

Sir John Evelyn, 4th Baronet (c. 1758 – 14 May 1833) was a British aristocrat.

== Family background ==
John was the eldest son of Charles Evelyn, by Philippa Wright, the daughter of Fortunatus Wright, the privateer. Charles Evelyn was the only son of another Charles Evelyn, who was the brother of Sir John Evelyn, 2nd Baronet, and the second son of Sir John Evelyn, 1st Baronet of Wotton. The elder Charles, of Yarlington, Somerset, died aged 40 in January 1748, while the younger Charles died before 1781. As the third baronet, Sir Frederick Evelyn, had no children, John Evelyn, his first cousin once removed, was his nearest male heir.

== Successions ==
A lieutenant in the Portsmouth division of the Royal Marines, John killed a postman and was declared "of unsound mind" on 28 July 1795; he spent the rest of his life incarcerated. He succeeded his cousin to the baronetcy on 1 April 1812, but did not inherit the estates, which were retained by the third baronet's widow until her own death when they passed to a more distant Evelyn cousin.

John never married and on his death aged 75 at Bexhill-on-Sea on 14 May 1833, he was succeeded by his only surviving younger brother, Hugh.

Baronetage of Great Britain
Preceded by Frederick Evelyn	Baronet (of Wotton); 1812–1833	Succeeded by Hugh Evelyn
