= Evelyn collection =

Collection of images of York, North Yorkshire, England

The Evelyn Collection is a collection of lantern slides and photographs which was compiled by Dr William Arthur Evelyn in York, between 1891 and his death on 6 January 1935. It consists of many views of York: its streets, buildings and events. The collection was donated to the Yorkshire Architectural and York Archaeological Society (YAYAS), of which Evelyn was a leading member, by him in December 1934 The collection is now held by YAYAS. See the society's website for access details. Some of Evelyn's photographs are featured in York - A Rare Insight. Pictures from the Evelyn Collection.

Dr William Arthur Evelyn also amassed a vast collection of around 1,200 images of York, North Yorkshire in the form of prints, drawings, paintings, plans, and original engraved copper plates. The entire collection was offered to York Corporation in 1930 and a subscription fund was started to raise the purchase price of £3,000. The collection was sold to York Corporation and was housed in York Art Gallery from July 1931.
