= Evelyn Bargelt =

American entertainer

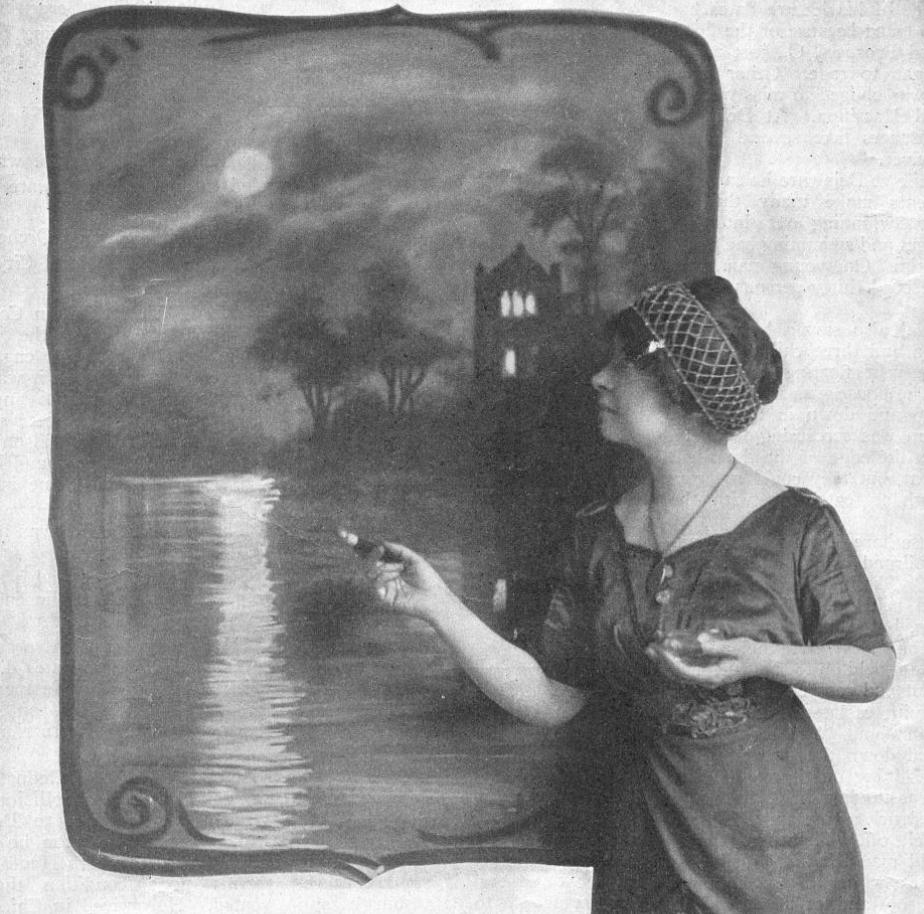
- Evelyn Bargelt, from a 1913 publication
- Born: Evelyn May Bargelt; September 9, 1877; Traverse City, Michigan, U.S.
- Died: March 4, 1957 (aged 79); Chicago, Illinois, U.S.
- Occupations: Cartoonist, entertainer

Evelyn May Bargelt (September 9, 1877 – March 4, 1957) was an American artist and entertainer, known as a "cartoonist-reader" and "one of the Chautauqua queens" when she toured the United States with her live painting show on the Chautauqua and lyceum circuit before 1920.

== Early life and education ==
Bargelt was from Traverse City, Michigan, the daughter of Henry (Harry) Smith Bargelt and Mary Loisette Carter Bargelt. She attended the Cumnock School of Oratory and the Chicago Art Institute.

== Career ==
Bargelt's stage act involved giving literary readings, accompanied by music, while she drew the stories' scenes, in pastel on paper. "She is a reader of ability, and a cartoonist of unusual cleverness," reported one magazine in 1908. She headed the Evelyn Bargelt Concert Company and toured the Chautauqua and lyceum circuit. During World War I, she went to Belgium and France to entertain American troops there.

Off stage, Bargelt painted portraits in Chicago. She had exhibits of her portraits at Marshall Field's in 1934, and at the Drake Hotel in 1939.

== Publications ==
- "Lyceum Course Free to Everyone" (1913)
- "The Young Girl in the Lyceum" (1913)

== Personal life ==
Bargelt died in 1957, at the age of 79, at her home in Chicago.
