= Leya Evelyn =

Canadian artist (born 1937)

- Born: 1937 (age 88–89); Washington, D.C., United States
- Education: Brown University; Yale University
- Style: Abstract artist
- Elected: Royal Canadian Academy of Arts (2011)
- Website: leyaevelyn.com

Leya Evelyn (RCA) is a Canadian artist.

== Life and work ==
Born in Washington, DC, Evelyn attended Brown University and Yale University (studying under Josef Albers). She emigrated to Nova Scotia in the 1980s. She is noted for her abstract art integrating pieces of photographs. Evelyn teaches at the Nova Scotia College of Art and Design. She was inducted into the Royal Canadian Academy of Arts in 2011. Her paintings are shown by galleries in Halifax, Calgary, Edmonton, San Francisco, New York, Switzerland and Denmark.
