= Gilbert Evelyn =

English politician

Gilbert Evelyn was an English politician. He was a member (MP) of the parliament of England for Totnes in 1659.
