= Evelyn Mora =

Finnish entrepreneur (born 1992)

- Born: Kimia Moradzadeh; 9 April 1992 (age 34); Vaasa, Finland
- Years active: 2014–present
- Known for: Helsinki Fashion Week
- Website: evelynmora.com

Evelyn Mora (born Kimia Moradzadeh; 9 April 1992) is a Finnish entrepreneur known for her work in sustainable fashion.

== Early life ==
Mora was born in Vaasa, Finland, and raised in Helsinki. She is French-Finnish and of Iranian descent on her mother's side.

== Career ==
Mora worked as a fashion photographer in Paris and London before returning to Finland. She founded the modelling agency Studio Eneas in 2014. The company was renamed Evelyn Mora Corporation in 2016.

In 2015, Mora acquired the trademarks for Helsinki Fashion Week and re-launched the event. It has since focused on a sustainable approach to the fashion industry. In 2019, Mora announced that Helsinki Fashion Week would no longer use leather in its collections.

Mora served as a Board member for the Nordic Fashion Week Association, which supported Helsinki Fashion Week. In 2021, Nordic Fashion Week filed for bankruptcy.

Mora founded Digital Village, a metaverse space and marketplace. In 2022, the company received $600,000 in funding from British Fashion Council.
