= Susan Schultz Huxman =

American academic administrator

9th president of Eastern Mennonite University
- Incumbent
- Assumed office January 2017

Personal details
- Spouse: Jesse Huxman
- Children: 3
- Education: Bethel College (BA); University of Kansas (MA, PhD)

Susan Schultz Huxman is an American academic administrator serving as the ninth president of Eastern Mennonite University since 2017. Her research focuses on communication studies and rhetoric, particularly in areas of pacifism and Mennonite discourse.

== Education ==
Huxman graduated from Bethel College in 1982 with a B.A. in English. She went on to earn both a M.A. (1986) and a Ph.D. (1988) in communication from the University of Kansas. Her master's thesis was titled, Mennonite Rhetoric in World War I: Reconciling Loyalties to God and Country. Her doctoral research focused on Mennonite rhetoric during World War I, with her dissertation titled In the World But Not of it: Mennonite Rhetoric in World War I as an Enactment of Paradox. Wilmer A. Linkugel was her doctoral advisor.

== Career ==
Huxman began her academic career at Wake Forest University, where she served as director of the public speaking program and assistant professor of speech communication and theater arts from 1988 to 1990. In 1990, she joined the faculty at Wichita State University (WSU), where she spent over two decades in various roles. These included director of the WSU oral communication program, coordinator of the M.A. in communication program, and eventually director of the Elliott School of Communication. During her time at WSU, she rose from assistant professor to associate professor and later to professor of communication.

In 2011, Huxman was appointed president of Conrad Grebel University College, affiliated with the University of Waterloo. She held this position until 2016, while also serving as a professor at the University of Waterloo. During her tenure, she contributed to the academic and administrative development of the institution and continued her research in communication studies, with a focus on rhetoric and pacifism. Huxman's published works include Landmark Speeches on U.S. Pacifism (2015), and she co-authored The Rhetorical Act: Thinking, Speaking, and Writing Critically, 5th edition (2015), a textbook in communication studies.

In January 2017, Huxman became the ninth president of Eastern Mennonite University (EMU). She is its first female president. In addition to her administrative duties, she has maintained a role in teaching and mentoring students. During her tenure, Huxman led both EMU's main campus in Harrisonburg, Virginia, and its Lancaster County, Pennsylvania campus. She oversaw the university's first comprehensive fundraising campaign, which raised $11.6 million, surpassing its original $10.7 million goal. In 2024, Huxman facilitated the relocation of the Lancaster campus to Manheim Township to better support the university's airplane pilot training program. She will retire after nine years of leadership, with an interim president expected to start on July 1, 2025. Huxman was elected chair of the Harrisonburg-Rockingham Chamber of Commerce, beginning her term in October 2024.

== Personal life ==
Huxman has been active in the Mennonite community throughout her life. She has served on the board of directors of the Mennonite Education Agency (MEA) from 2001 to 2007 and has been involved in the Western District Conference of Mennonite Church USA. She is a member of Stirling Avenue Mennonite Church in Kitchener, Ontario, and was previously a member of Lorraine Avenue Mennonite Church in Wichita, Kansas, for twenty years.

Huxman is married to Jesse Huxman, a former director of communications at the Mennonite Foundation of Canada and former director of content at KPTS-TV 8. They have three adult children.
