= Évelyne Pinard =

French javelin thrower (1923–2014)

Evelyne Pinard, born Osterhold, (May 15, 1923 – September 4, 2014) was a French athlete who specialised in the javelin and who was selected 24 times for French national teams from 1947 to 1957. She was ten times champion of France. She was born in Strasbourg.

Pinard finished 11th in the javelin throw at the European Championships in Brussels in 1950 with a result of 37.22 m. She won the French javelin championship in 1947–53 and 1955–57 and the pentathlon in 1945. She threw the French javelin record of 38.36 m in 1948, which she improved to 40.61 m in 1950 and 42.38 m in 1955. She was 164 centimeters tall and weighed 58 kilos during her active years.

== Personal bests ==
- Javelin: 42.38 m (1955)
- Shot put : 11.43 m (1956)
