= Evelyn Paul =

English painter

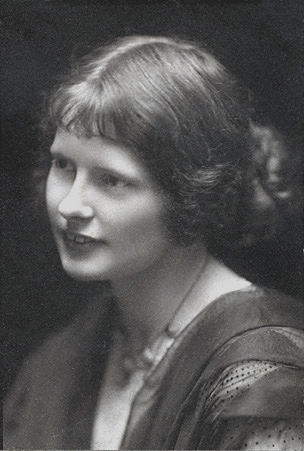
- Evelyn, about age 24
- Born: 1883
- Died: 1963 (aged 79–80)
- Occupation: illustrator

Evelyn Maude Blanche Paul (1883 – 1963) was a British artist best known for her book illustrations, including those that replicate the style of medieval illuminations. Her work shows a variety of influences, including Gothic, Art Nouveau, and Arts and Crafts. Most significantly, the Pre-Raphaelite artist Dante Gabriel Rossetti has been identified as one of Paul's major influences.

== Biography ==
Paul was born on 4 November 1883, at 30 Torriano Avenue, Kentish Town, in North London. Her father was the portraitist Robert Boyd Paul (1819–1903), and her mother was Annie née McGlashan (born 1858 at Gibraltar), the daughter of a sergeant in the Royal Artillery and Robert Paul's second wife. In her teens, Evelyn attended art school in London and in 1906 entered the Schools of Art National Competition. She continued her studies and, on 1 June 1911, married the artist Alexander George Small (1875-1923), son of William Small (1843-1929), a well-known painter and honorary Fellow of the Royal Scottish Academy.

Alexander died twelve years later in 1923 at St Pancras Hospital, London, at the age of 48. Evelyn died of broncho-pneumonia at the same hospital on 29 January 1963.

== Selected works ==
- Stories from Dante (1911);
- Myths & Legends of Japan (1912);
- The Romance of Tristram of Lyones and La beale Isoude (1913);
- Dante's La Vita Nuova (1916);
- Aucassin & Nicolete (1917); and
- Clair de Lune and Other Troubadour Romances (1921).

== Gallery ==
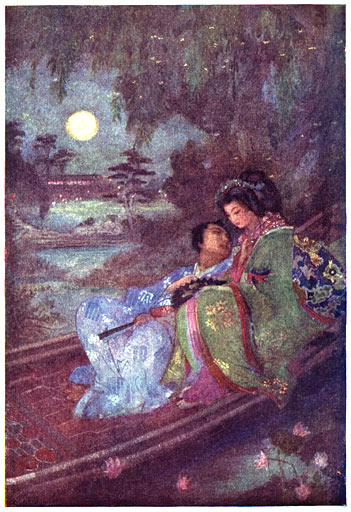
Lovers Exchanging Fans

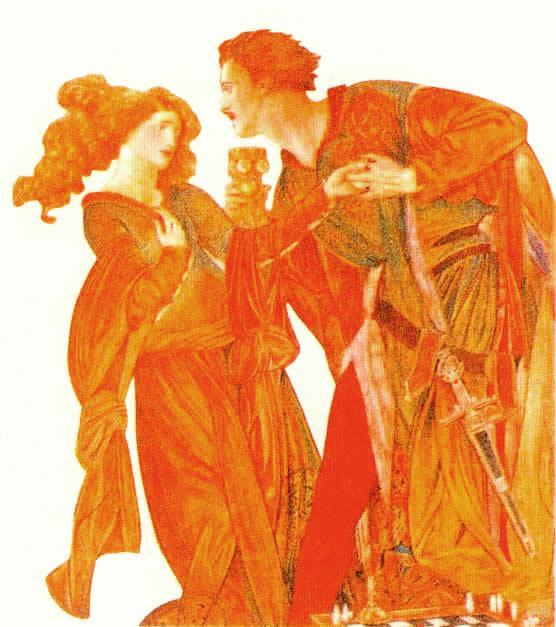
Tristan and Isolde

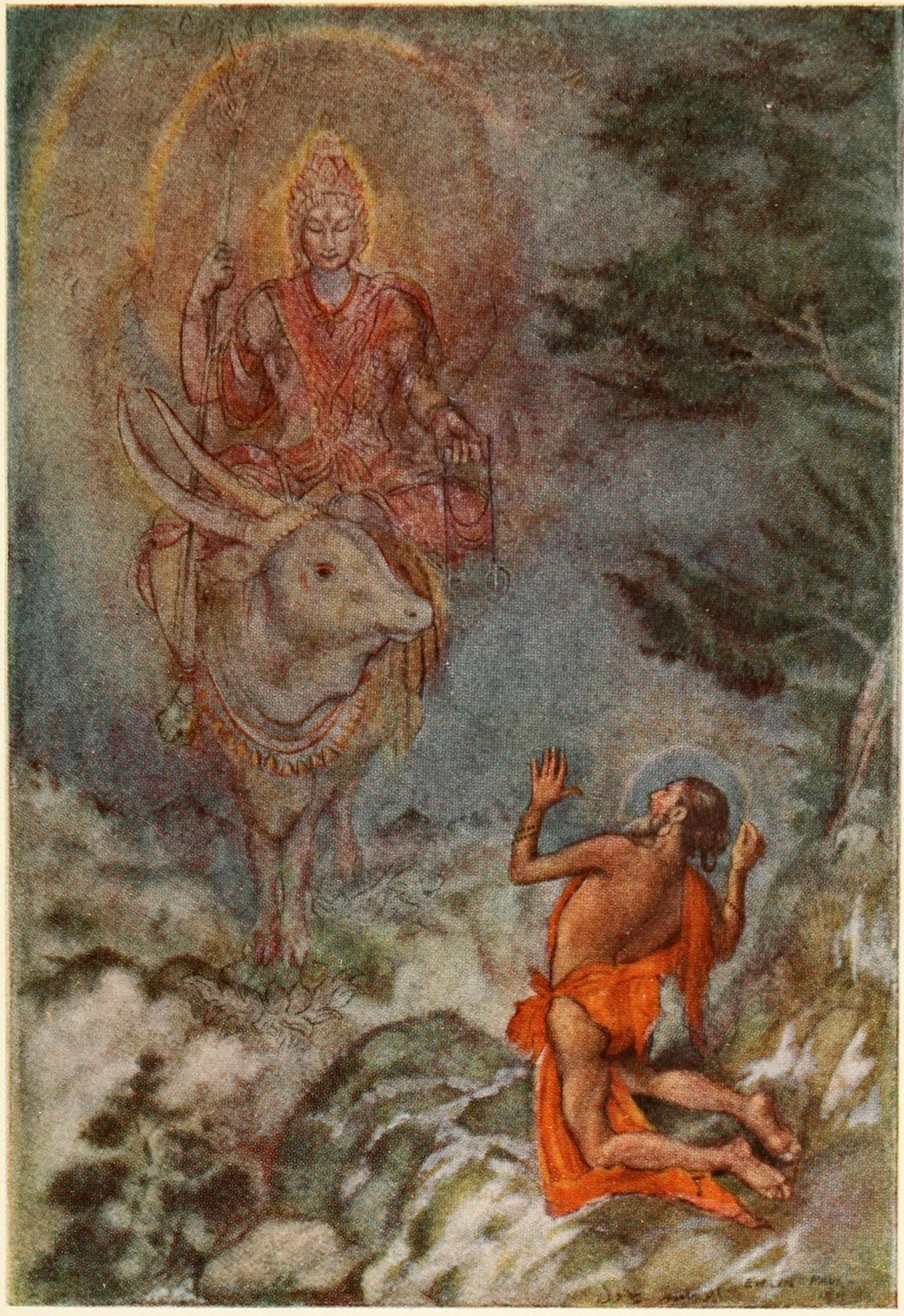
The Rider on the Snow-white Bull
