= Eveleen Laura Mason =

American writer (1838–1914)

- Born: Eveleen Laura Knaggs; September 3, 1838; Boston, Massachusetts, U.S.
- Died: September 7, 1914 (aged 76); Brookline, Massachusetts, U.S.
- Occupations: Writer, suffragist, clubwoman

Eveleen Laura Knaggs Mason (September 3, 1838 – September 7, 1914) was an American writer, suffragist, and clubwoman.

== Early life and education ==
Knaggs was born in Boston, the daughter of Thomas Jackson Knaggs and Elizabeth Milner Knaggs.

== Career ==
Mason taught school as a young woman, fostered children in her home, and worked to establish a travelers' aid program for young women new to Boston. She was a member of the Brookline Education Society, a vice president of the Moral Education Association of Massachusetts, and founder and president of the Queens of Home Club. She wrote fiction and non-fiction with utopian, feminist, political and spiritualist themes. Her work is sometimes counted with early American science fiction by women writers.

Mason gave the opening prayer at an 1880 National Woman Suffrage Association meeting in Chicago, and she spoke at the 1884 meeting of the Wisconsin Women's Suffrage Convention. "Miss Eveleen L. Mason, an attractive, refined-looking lady, made one of the best speeches of the morning", reported The Inter Ocean in 1880. "She has heard it objected to woman suffrage that woman was the helpmeet of man. She thought that was the very reason why she should take a part".

== Publications ==
- Hiero-Salem: The Vision of Peace: A Fiction Founded on Ideals which are Grounded in THE REAL, that is Greater than the Greatest of All Human Great Ideals (1889)
- "What is America's Relation to England?" (1896)
- An Episode in the Doings of the Dualized (1898)
- Who Builds? A Romance (1903)
- Mad? Which? Neither? (1904)
- Twelve Outputs Selected from Among Lectures and Articles Put Out from 1879 to Summer Tide of 1907 (1907)
- The Discovery of Discoveries (1908)
- "'Enthralling and Subjugating Men'" (1908)

== Personal life ==
Knaggs married Baptist minister August Francke Hermann Mason in 1863. Her husband died in 1903, and she died in 1914, at the age of 76, in Brookline, Massachusetts.
