= James Hamilton, 2nd Earl of Clanbrassil =

Anglo-Irish politician (1730–1798)

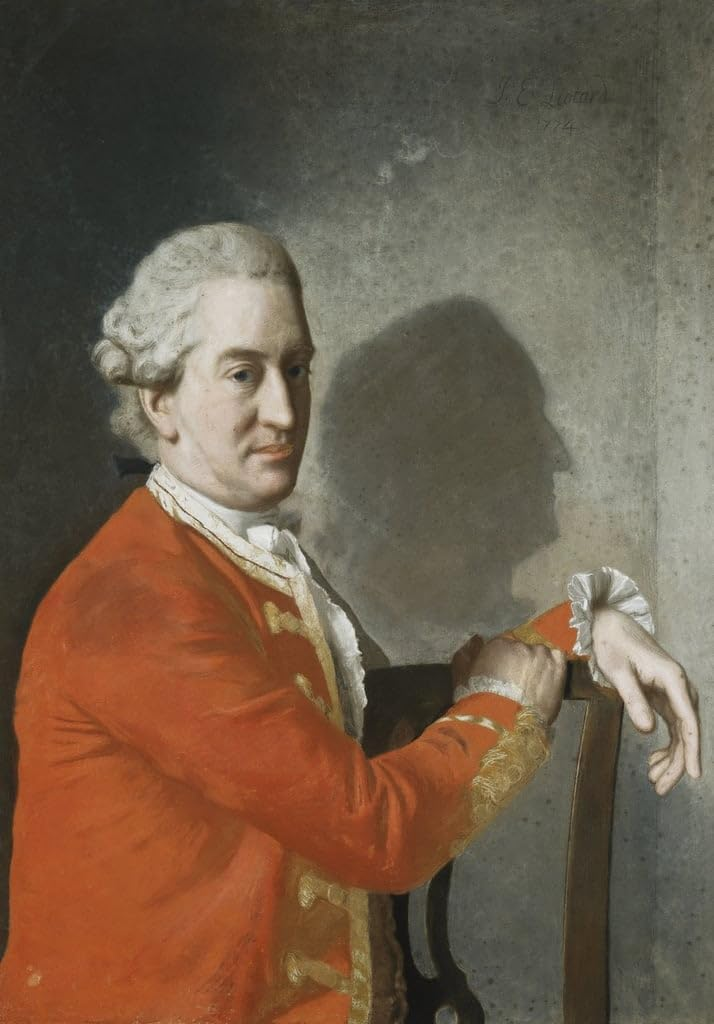
1774 portrait of Clanbrassil by Jean-Étienne Liotard

James Hamilton, 2nd Earl of Clanbrassil (23 August 1730 – 6 February 1798), styled Viscount Limerick from 1756 to 1758, was an Anglo-Irish politician.

== Biography ==
Lord Clanbrassil was the son of James Hamilton, 1st Earl of Clanbrassil, and Lady Harriet Bentinck. The Hamilton dynasty were an Ulster-Scots family by origin. He sat in the Irish House of Commons as the Member of Parliament for Midleton between 1755 and 1758, and served as High Sheriff of Louth in 1757. On 17 March 1758, he succeeded to his father's titles and became Earl of Clanbrassil. As his title was in the Peerage of Ireland, he was not barred from election to the House of Commons of Great Britain. As such, he served as the MP for Helston from 1768 to 1774. On 4 July 1766 he was made a member of the Privy Council of Ireland and was Custos Rotulorum of County Louth between 1769 and 1798. On 5 February 1783 he was made a Knight of the Order of the Garter and on 11 March that year he was appointed a Knight Founder of the Order of St Patrick.

He married The Hon. Grace Foley, daughter of The 1st Baron Foley and The Hon. Grace Granville, on 21 May 1774 at Oxford Chapel, Marylebone. He died without issue in 1798, his titles then became extinct and a large fortune was inherited by his sister, Lady Anne Hamilton, the wife of Robert Jocelyn, 1st Earl of Roden. Grace, his wife, died in 1813. He is buried in Dundalk churchyard. His name survives in that of Clanbrassil Street, Dublin.

Parliament of Ireland
| Preceded by Eaton Stannard; William Annesley | Member of Parliament for Midleton; 1755–1758; With: William Annesley | Succeeded by William Annesley; James St John Jeffereyes |
Parliament of Great Britain
| Preceded by William Windham; William Evelyn | Member of Parliament for Helston; 1768–1774; With: William Evelyn | Succeeded by Marquess of Carmarthen; Francis Owen |
Peerage of Ireland
| Preceded by James Hamilton | Earl of Clanbrassil; 1758–1798 | Extinct |
