= Edward Evelyn (footballer) =

Welsh footballer

Personal information
- Full name: Edward Clement Evelyn
- Date of birth: 18 November 1862
- Place of birth: Radnorshire, Wales
- Date of death: 5 May 1936
- Place of death: Scottsbluff, Nebraska, USA
- Position: Defender

Senior career*
| Years | Team | Apps | (Gls) |
- Crusaders

International career
| 1887 | Wales | 1 | (0) |
- * Club domestic league appearances and goals

Edward Clement Evelyn (18 November 1862 – 5 May 1936) was a Welsh international footballer. He was part of the Wales national football team, playing 1 match on 26 February 1887 against England.

On club level he played for Crusaders.

He emigrated to the United States and died in Nebraska in 1936. A newspaper obituary of his death claimed dubiously that he was the son of a Lord Evelyn. He had two brothers. Francis was a first-class cricketer, while William was a historian.

== See also ==
- List of Wales international footballers (alphabetical)
