= John Evelyn (1591–1664) =

English politician

Sir John Evelyn (1591–1664) was an English politician who sat in the House of Commons at various times between 1628 and 1660. He reluctantly supported the Parliamentary side in the English Civil War.

Evelyn was the son of Sir John Evelyn of Kingston, Godstone, Surrey and Marden, MP and his wife Elizabeth Stever, daughter of William Stever of Kingston upon Thames. He was baptised at Kingston upon Thames on 20 October 1591. He was admitted at Emmanuel College, Cambridge on 13 March 1606. He was a member of the Virginia Company in 1612 and of the East India Company in 1624. He was a JP for Surrey from 1624.

In 1628, Evelyn was elected Member of Parliament for Bletchingley and sat until 1629 when King Charles decided to rule without parliament for eleven years. As government contractor of gunpowder in June 1628, he was in the credit of the crown for £2400 and had ceased to supply the navy. In November 1640, Evelyn was re-elected MP for Bletchingley in the Long Parliament. He was knighted on 25 June 1641. He sat in parliament until 1648 when he was excluded under Pride's Purge. He was a commissioner for assessments from 1643 to 1648 and a commissioner for sequestrations in 1643.

In 1660, Evelyn was re-elected MP for Bletchingley in the Convention Parliament.

Evelyn died at the age of 71 and was buried at Godstone, Surrey on 18 January 1664.

Evelyn married Thomasine Heynes daughter of William Heynes of Chessington. Their son John was created a baronet, of Godstone.

Parliament of England
Preceded by Edward Bysshe (elder); Henry Lovell	Member of Parliament for Bletchingley; 1628–1629; With: Sir Edward Bishopp, 2nd Baronet	Parliament suspended until 1640
Preceded by Edward Bysshe; Edmund Hoskins	Member of Parliament for Bletchingley; 1640–1648; With: Edward Bysshe	Not represented in Rump Parliament
