= Travis Huxman =

American plant physiological ecologist

- Spouse: Kim Huxman

Academic background
- Education: BSc, Biology, 1993, MSc, Biology, 1996, California State University, San Bernardino; PhD, Biological Science, 2000, University of Nevada, Las Vegas
- Thesis: Reproductive and growth responses of Mojave Desert plants to a changing climate (2000)

Academic work
- Institutions: University of California, Irvine; University of Arizona

Travis E. Huxman is an American plant physiological ecologist.

== Early life and education ==
Huxman completed his Bachelor of Science and Master's degree from the California State University, San Bernardino and his PhD in biological science at the University of Nevada, Las Vegas.

== Career ==
=== University of Arizona ===
Following his postdoctoral research position at the University of Colorado, Boulder, Huxman became an assistant professor at the University of Arizona. Upon joining the faculty, he earned funding for his project "Development of Riparian Evapotranspiration and Ecohydrologic Models to Predict Changes in and Consequences of Riparian Water Availability." During his tenure at the University of Arizona, he led their efforts to acquire ownership of Biosphere 2 and transform it into a laboratory for scientific research. He was later appointed the director of Biosphere 2 and co-director of the Arizona Center for STEM teachers. In these roles, he also co-authored a journal article calling for greater recognition of the role of humans in causing and exacerbating water scarcity.

=== University of California, Irvine ===
Huxman left the University of Arizona in 2012 to become a professor in the department of ecology and evolutionary biology and director of the Center for Environmental Biology at the University of California, Irvine (UCI). Following this, he was elected a Fellow of the Ecological Society of America for "advancing our understanding of plant ecophysiology, with fundamental work on the ecology and evolution of functional traits in plants, the effects of climate change on ecosystems, and the factors influencing restoration and conservation." As the director of the UCI Sustainability Initiative, the Center for Environmental Biology, and the Steele/Burnand Anza-Borrego Desert Research Center, Huxman was also awarded the Outstanding University Service award.

In 2020, Huxman was also elected a fellow of the American Association for the Advancement of Science for "distinguished contributions to the field of physiological plant ecology, particularly functional trait evolution and influence in ecosystems under global change."

== Personal life ==
Huxman and his wife Kim have two daughters together.
