= William Arthur Evelyn =

British historian (1860–1935)

- Born: 4 October 1860; Presteigne, Radnorshire, Wales
- Died: 6 January 1935 (aged 74); Clifton, York, England
- Occupations: General practitioner Historical conservationist

William Arthur Evelyn MRCS LRCP (4 October 1860 – 6 January 1935) was a historian of York, England. He championed the preservation and conservation of the city's architectural and archaeological heritage. He also gathered an extensive collection of paintings, drawings and photographs of the city. The artworks were later sold to York Art Gallery. The Evelyn collection of photographs are now cared for by the Yorkshire Architectural and York Archaeological Society.

== Biography ==
William Arthur Evelyn was born on 4 October 1860 in Presteigne, Radnorshire, Wales. He was the third child of Francis Evelyn and his wife Annie Mawhill. William had an older sister Annie (1857–1889) who died young. His older brother Francis Evelyn (1859–1910) was a Justice of the Peace and played first-class cricket; a younger brother Edward Evelyn (1862–1936) played football for Wales before emigrating to the United States.

Evelyn was educated at Cheltenham Proprietary School, Charterhouse School and Gonville & Caius College, Cambridge. In 1887 after further study at St Thomas' Hospital, London he became a doctor. He was interested in the possibility of curing pulmonary tuberculosis, or consumption, and, after completing his studies in Vienna, took up a position at the Brompton Consumption Hospital, London. In 1891 Evelyn moved to York to become a G.P. at the practice of Dr William H. Jalland at Museum Street.

On 14 June 1894, Evelyn married Constance Hardman in Reigate parish church. They went on to have five children. In the same year he acquired 61 Micklegate in York.

In 1902 Evelyn joined the Yorkshire Architectural and York Archaeological Society. He was an active member and acted as treasurer and secretary. From 1931 to his death, he was vice-president of the society. Evelyn was a member of the Yorkshire Philosophical Society (YPS) for over 37 years and served on its council from 1911 and as a vice-president from 1923. Whilst at the YPS he served as an Honorary Curator of Archaeology at the Yorkshire Museum at the same time as Walter Harvey Brook, Thomas Boynton, George Benson, and Rev Canon John Solloway. He participated in several conservation campaigns in York, including those to protect and preserve York's walls, Queen Margaret's Arch and the city's oldest houses on Goodramgate.

Evelyn was an avid collector of artwork which depicted York and its environs. He used lantern slides of many of his pieces to illustrate public lectures on the history of the city. In 1931 the City of York bought his collection of paintings, drawings and engravings for £3,000. These are now housed in York Art Gallery. The glass lantern slide collection, now named the Evelyn collection, was given to Y.A.Y.A.S. in December 1934.

Evelyn died on 6 January 1935 at his home in Clifton, York.

A plaque was dedicated to Evelyn in 1985 by York Civic Trust and installed on his former residence of 33 Bootham and reads: "Dr William Arthur Evelyn (1860–1935). A pioneer of conservation of the city of York between 1891 and 1935. He lived in this house from 1910 to 1931. This plaque was erected by York Civic Trust and the Yorkshire Architectural and York Archaeological Society in 1985 to mark the 50th anniversary of his death."
