= William Evelyn (British Army officer) =

British soldier and politician

Lieutenant-General William Evelyn (10 February 1723 – 13 August 1783) was a British soldier and Member of Parliament. The sixth son of Sir John Evelyn, 1st Baronet of Wotton, he was educated at Westminster School. He was commissioned as an ensign in the 2nd Foot Guards in 1739, became a lieutenant-colonel in 1754, colonel in 1762, major-general in 1770 and lieutenant-general in 1777. He was colonel of the 29th Foot from 1769 until his death.

Evelyn entered Parliament in 1767 as member for Helston, replacing his elder brother; he generally voted with the government in the House of Commons, although he is not recorded as having ever spoken. He did not stand for re-election in 1774, but was a candidate for Helston once more in 1780, when the returning officer made a double return (reporting all the candidates in a disputed election as elected so that the relevant House of Commons committee could determine the outcome). The committee decided against him, so he was unable to retake his seat: nor, ironically, could his opponent Jocelyn Deane, who had died before the dispute was settled.

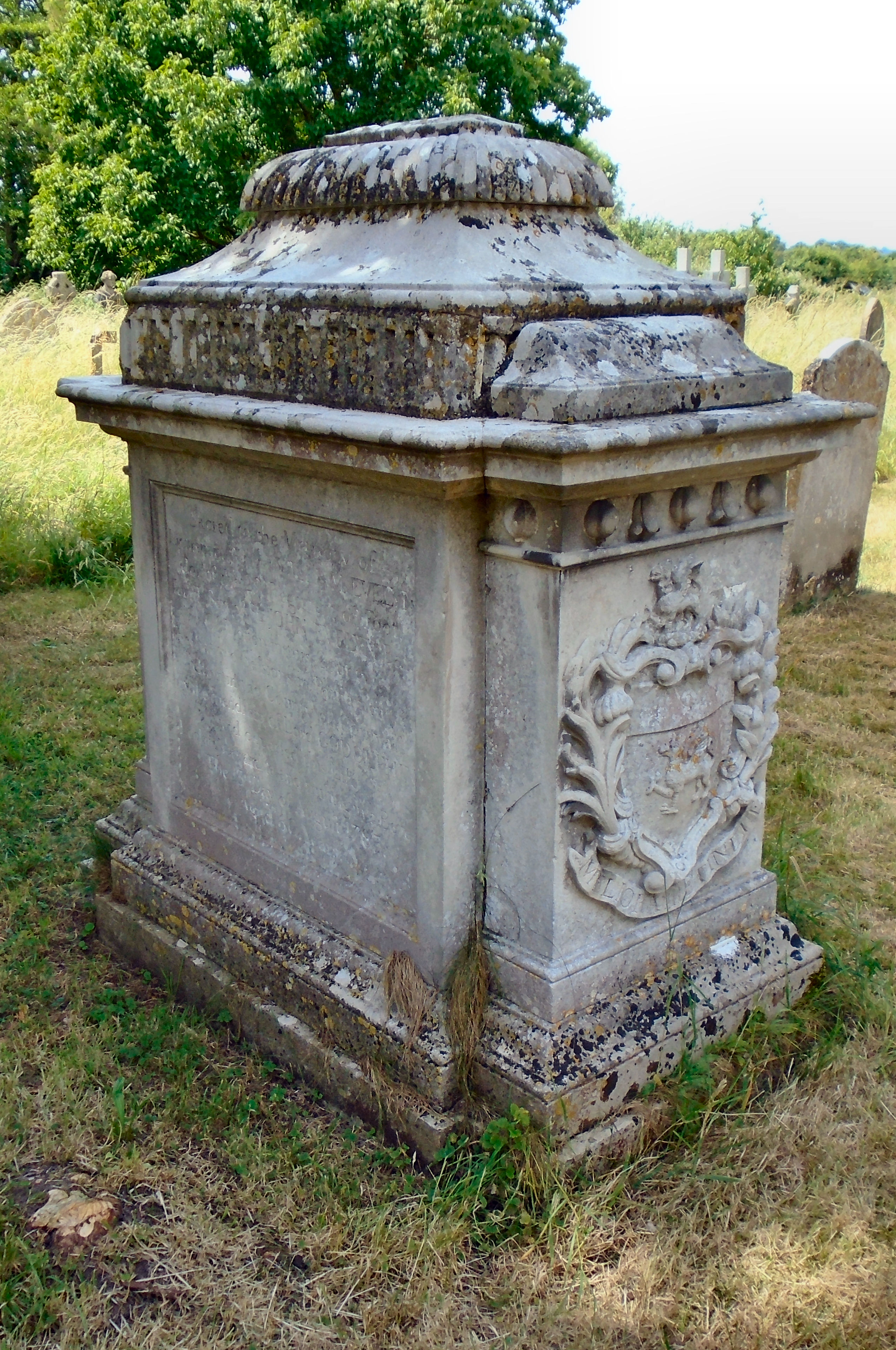
Tomb of William Evelyn

Evelyn died unmarried in 1783, and is buried at Send in Surrey.

Military offices
Preceded by George Forbes, 4th Earl of Granard	Colonel of the 29th Regiment of Foot; 1769–1783	Succeeded by Hon. William Tryon
Parliament of Great Britain
Preceded by William Windham; Sir John Evelyn	Member of Parliament for Helston; 1767–1774; With: William Windham 1767–1768; The Earl of Clanbrassil 1768–1774	Succeeded by Marquess of Carmarthen; Francis Owen
