= Evelyn Williams (artist) =

British painter (1929–2012)

- Born: Evelyn Jane Brendan Williams; January 21, 1929; Streatham, London, England
- Died: 14 November 2012 (aged 83); London, England
- Education: Summerhill School
- Alma mater: Saint Martin's School of Art; Royal College of Art
- Style: Figurative artist
- Spouses: Michael Fussell (m. 1949; div. 1963); Richard Anthony Perry (m. 1963; died 2012)
- Children: 2

Evelyn Jane Brendan Williams (21 January 1929 – 14 November 2012) was a British figurative artist.

== Early life and education ==
Evelyn Jane Brendan Williams was born on 21 January 1929 at 63 Leigham Court Road, Streatham, London, the younger daughter of Brendan Bernard Williams (1904–1986), a journalist and writer, and his wife, Jennie Maude Williams, née Jones (1905–1983), an opera singer.

She was educated at Summerhill School, as recommended to her father by his friend Bertrand Russell, and then trained at Saint Martin's School of Art in London, and the Royal College of Art.

== Career ==
Williams was a figurative artist.

== Recognition and exhibitions ==
In 1950, one of Williams's portraits of children won an Observer prize, and Hugh Casson became a supporter of her work.

In 1973, a career retrospective was held at the Whitechapel Gallery.

Williams' work is held in the public collections of the Victoria and Albert Museum, the Arts Council Collection, Sheffield's Graves Art Gallery, the collection of the Contemporary Art Society for Wales and Amgueddfa Cymru – Museum Wales.

In February 2020, William's work was on display at an exhibition at Anima Mundi art gallery in St Ives, Cornwall, South West England.

In her obituary in The Guardian, it was said that her work, "combined vision, dream and reality", and that she had said her art was "inner thoughts, other worlds".

== Personal life and death ==
On 28 December 1949, she married a fellow RCA student, the artist Michael Fussell (1927–1974), and they had a daughter, Emma. In 1963, the marriage was dissolved.

On 26 October 1963 she married, (Richard) Anthony Perry (born 1928), a film producer and charity director, and they had one daughter, Sarah.

Williams died on 14 November 2012 of chronic obstructive pulmonary disease, at her home, 12 Finsbury Park Road, London.
