= Frederick Evelyn =

British aristocrat (1734 – 1812)

Sir Frederick Evelyn, 3rd Baronet (1734 – 1 April 1812) was a British aristocrat.

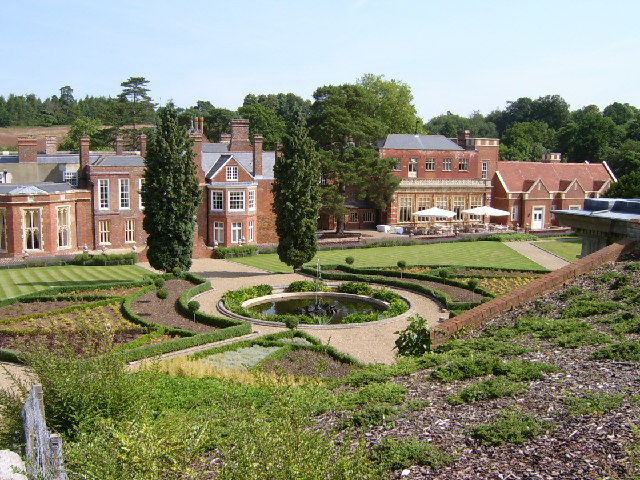
Wotton House at rear

He was born in 1734, the only son of Sir John Evelyn, 2nd Baronet, and served in Elliot's Light Horse at the battle of Minden in 1759, during the Seven Years' War. He succeeded his father to the baronetcy created for his grandfather, Sir John Evelyn, 1st Baronet of Wotton, on 11 June 1767, inheriting Wotton House, Surrey.

He was a member of the Jockey Club, and married on 8 August 1769, at St Marylebone, Mary Turton, daughter and heiress of William Turton of Staffordshire. They had no children and on his death, aged 78, the baronetcy was inherited by his cousin once removed John Evelyn, and his estates passed to his widow. She died on 12 November 1817, in her 72nd year. They were both buried at Wotton, Surrey. She devised the Wotton and Sayes Court estates to another John Evelyn, her husband's fifth cousin, who, like her husband, was sixth in descent from George Evelyn (died 1603, aged 77), of Kingston upon Thames, Long Ditton, Godstone and Wotton, all in Surrey.

Baronetage of Great Britain
Preceded by John Evelyn	Baronet (of Wotton); 1767–1812	Succeeded by John Evelyn
