= Sir John Evelyn, 1st Baronet, of Godstone =

Sir John Evelyn, 1st Baronet (12 March 1633 – 10 August 1671) was an English landowner in Surrey. Created a baronet at the English Restoration, he inherited the Godstone estate in 1664. He quarreled extensively with his family to obtain more money and impaired the estate with debts from a profligate lifestyle. The baronetcy became extinct upon his death and his entailed estates passed to his brother George.

He was the second but first surviving son of Sir John Evelyn and his wife Thomasine Heynes. Evelyn married Mary Farmer, daughter of George Farmer, prothonotary of the Common Pleas, about 1653. As part of his marriage settlement, his father bestowed on him two manors in Godstone, Marden (now in Woldingham) and Flower, and the manor of Tillingdon in Tandridge. Evelyn was created a baronet on 29 May 1660 and was proposed as a Knight of the Royal Oak, with an income of £1,800 per year.

His wife Mary died in 1663, without issue. Late in 1664, he married Anne Glynne (d. 1691), daughter of John Glynne, by whom he had one daughter, Frances (d. 1681).

Sir John succeeded his father in 1664, inheriting an extensive estate in Godstone, including the manors of Walkhampstead or Godstone, Godstone Place, Lee Place, Marden, and Flower in Godstone. He was appointed High Sheriff of Surrey for the year 1666.

Sir John was on bad terms with the rest of his family, filing a bill in the Court of Exchequer Chamber alleging that, being out of the country when his father died, his mother and brother George had taken the opportunity to withhold papers showing Sir John's right to certain of his father's lands. Lady Evelyn and George denied these charges, and added that Sir John had extorted certain lands from his father while the latter was alive, to avoid a lawsuit, taken a part of Lady Evelyn's jointure, and that Lady Evelyn had felt compelled to flee the family seat less than a month after her husband's death because of Sir John's temper. He was reported by John Aubrey to have demolished the manor house at Godstone because his brother would not grant him money "to satisfy his vicious Inclinations".

Shortly before his death on 10 August 1671, Sir John conveyed Marden Park (including Tillingdon) and Flower to his mistress Mary Gittings. She in turn sold them to Robert Clayton and John Morris in 1672 (Marden) and 1677 (Flower). He was buried at Godstone. The baronetcy became extinct, and the entailed estates passed to his brother George; Sir John left £500 to his legitimate daughter Frances, whom he repudiated, and £500 per year to his natural daughter by Gittings, who shared her mother's name. George brought an action against her to prove her undue influence on Sir John's will, but was not successful in recovering Marden and Flower.

Honorary titles
Preceded by Sir William Humble, Bt	High Sheriff of Surrey; 1666	Succeeded by Dawes Wymondeshold
Baronetage of England
New creation	Baronet (of Godstone); 1660–1671	Extinct
