= Sir John Evelyn, 2nd Baronet =

British courtier and Whig politician

John Evelyn
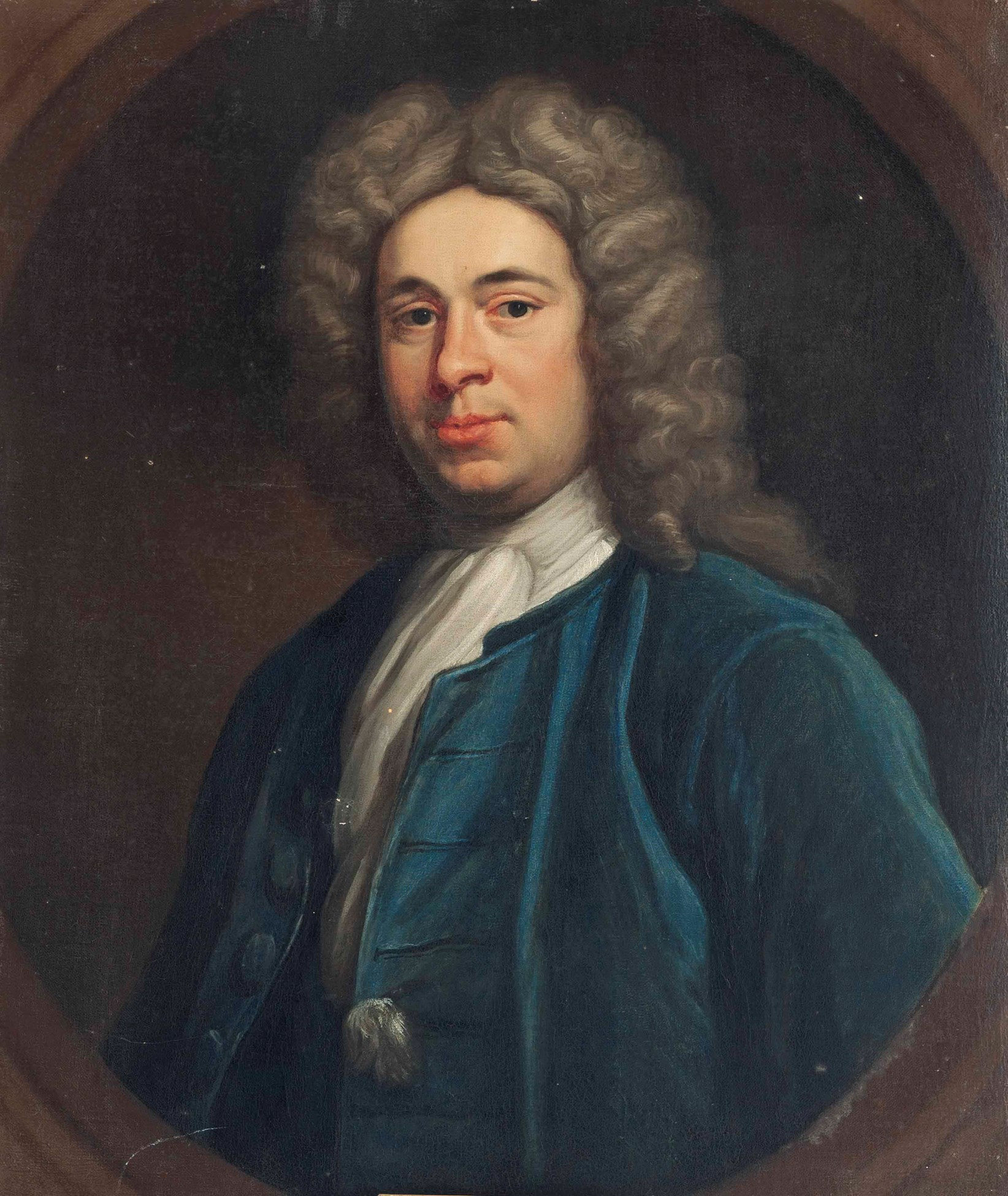

Member of the British House of Commons
- In office 1726 – 11 June 1767
- Preceded by: Exton Sayer
- Succeeded by: William Evelyn
- Constituency: Helston (1726-1741); Penryn (1741-1747); Helston (1747-1767)

Personal details
- Born: 24 August 1706 Wotton, England, Kingdom of England
- Died: 11 June 1767 (aged 60) Wotton, England, Great Britain
- Party: Whig
- Children: Frederick
- Parent: John Evelyn

Sir John Evelyn, 2nd Baronet (24 August 1706 – 11 June 1767) was a British courtier and Whig politician who sat in the House of Commons for 40 years from 1727 to 1767.

Evelyn was born in Wotton, the eldest son of John Evelyn, Commissioner of the customs, and his wife Anne Boscawen, daughter of Edward Boscawen. He matriculated at Queen's College, Oxford, on 28 May 1725, aged 18.

Evelyn was returned unopposed by Lord Godolphin as Member of Parliament for Helston at the 1727 British general election. He voted with the Administration until 1738. He entered the service of Frederick, Prince of Wales, as Equerry from 1731 to 1733 and Groom of the bedchamber from 1733 to 1751. He was returned unopposed again as MP for Helston at the 1734 British general election. In 1738, he followed Prince Frederick into opposition and was one of the opposition Whigs who withdrew on the motion to remove Walpole in February 1741. At the 1741 British general election, he was returned as MP for Penryn by Lord Falmouth. He continued to follow the Prince’s politics, and supported the Administration after the fall of Walpole in 1742 until 1747, when Frederick reverted to opposition. At the 1747 British general election, he was returned again for Helston as a member of the Prince’s party, when Frederick paid £300 towards his election expenses. After Frederick’s death, Evelyn went over to the Government side.

At the 1754 British general election, Evelyn was returned unopposed again as an MP for Helston. He was appointed clerk of the household to George, Prince of Wales in 1756. In 1760, he was appointed Clerk of the Green Cloth to George, Prince of Wales, subsequently King George III. He was returned again as MP for Helston at the 1761 British general election. He succeeded to the baronetcy on the death of his father on 15 July 1763.

Evelyn married Mary Boscawen, the fourth daughter of his maternal uncle Hugh Boscawen, on 17 August 1732 at Westminster Abbey. She was born on 12 November 1705 and was baptised on 21 November 1705 at St. James's, Westminster. She died on 15 September 1749, and was buried at Wotton. He died on 11 June 1767 aged 60 in Wotton and was buried there 8 days later. He was succeeded by his only son Frederick. There is a known lifetime portrait of Sir John, Attributed to Jonathan Richardson with family provenance formally with Cider House Galleries Ltd.

Parliament of Great Britain
| Preceded by Exton Sayer; Walter Carey | Member of Parliament for Helston; 1726 – 1741; With: John Harris | Succeeded by Thomas Walker; Francis Godolphin |
| Preceded by Sir Richard Mill, Bt; John Clavering | Member of Parliament for Penryn; 1741 – 1747; With: Edward Vernon 1741–43; George Boscawen from 1743 | Succeeded by George Boscawen; Henry Seymour Conway |
| Preceded by Thomas Walker; Francis Godolphin | Member of Parliament for Helston; 1747 – 11 June 1767; With: Francis Godolphin; William Windham | Succeeded by William Windham; William Evelyn |
Baronetage of Great Britain
| Preceded by John Evelyn | Baronet (of Wotton); 1763 – 11 June 1767 | Succeeded by Frederick Evelyn |
