= Evelyn baronets =

Set index for Evelyn baronets

There have been three Evelyn baronetcies, two in the Baronetage of England and one in the Baronetage of Great Britain. All are now extinct. The three families, from Surrey, were closely related.

- Evelyn baronets of Godstone (1660): see Sir John Evelyn, 1st Baronet (1633–1671)
- Evelyn baronets of Long Ditton (1683): see Sir Edward Evelyn, 1st Baronet (1626–1692)
- Evelyn baronets of Wotton (1713)
