= Sir John Evelyn, 1st Baronet, of Wotton =

British official and politician

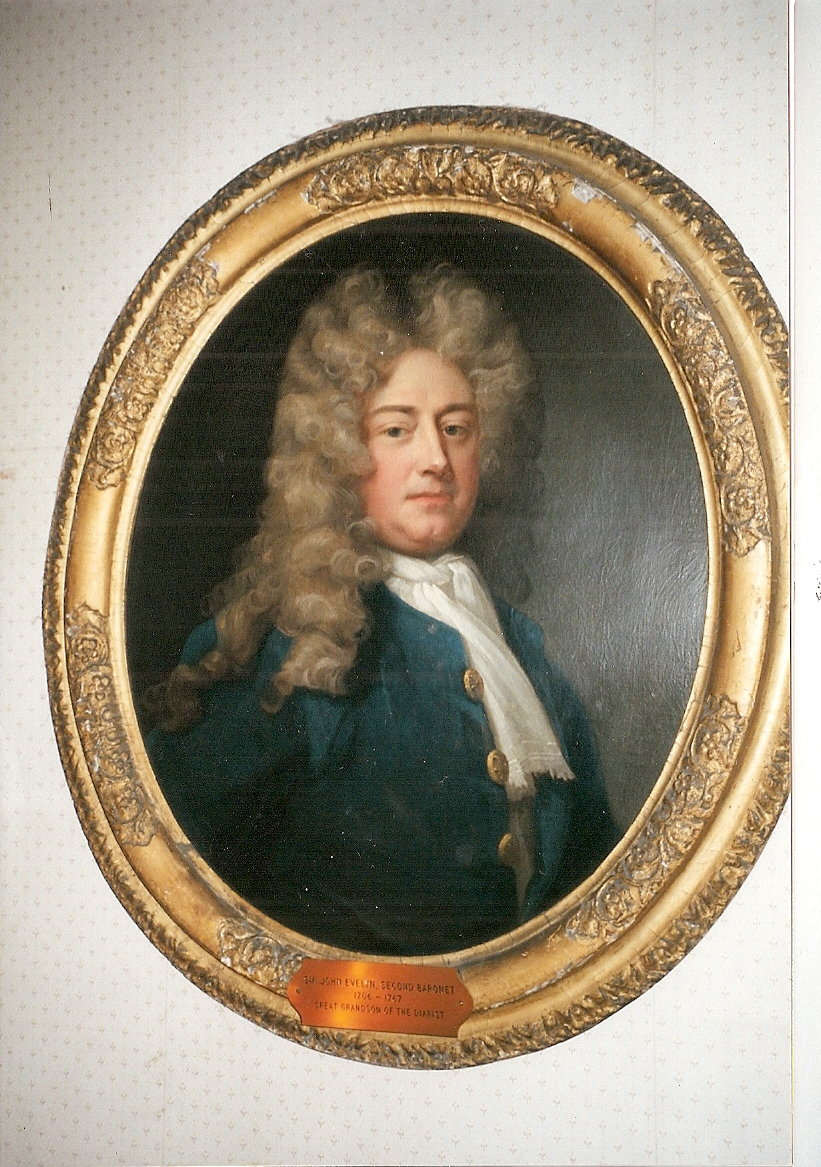
Sir John Evelyn of Wotton, 1st Bt (The label is incorrect)

Sir John Evelyn, 1st Baronet (1 March 1682 – July 1763) of Wotton, Surrey, was a British official and politician who sat in the House of Commons from 1708 to 1710. His grandfather, the diarist John Evelyn, influenced his independent attitude in politics and stimulated his dedication to literature. His public offices included Postmaster-general from 1708 to 1715.

== Early life ==
Evelyn was born on 1 March 1682 at Sayes Court in Deptford, Kent, the second but only surviving son of John Evelyn the Younger, barrister of the Middle Temple and Commissioner of the Revenue, and his wife, Martha Spencer, daughter and co-heir of Richard Spencer. He was baptised the following day. He was educated at the French school at Greenwich in 1689, at Kings Street under Mr Arbuthnot in 1691 and at Eton College from 1692 to 1698. He matriculated at Balliol College, Oxford, on 25 February 1699, aged 16. His father died in 1699, leaving him heir apparent to the Wotton estate.

== Career ==
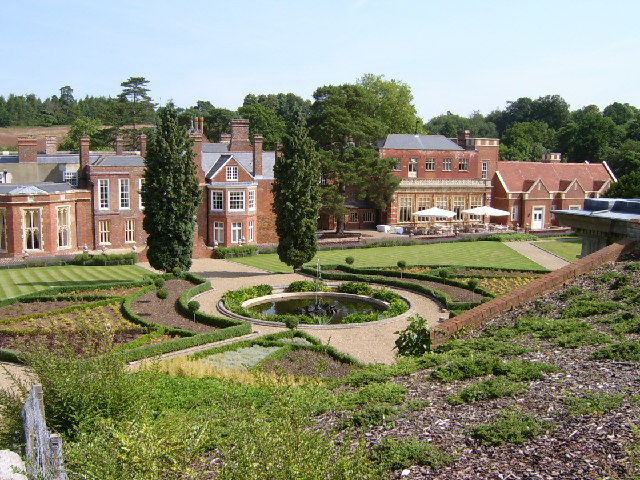
Wotton House, Surrey

Evelyn came under the patronage of Sidney Godolphin, Lord Treasurer, a close family friend who helped him to government places. He was appointed Receiver of stamp duties in 1703, and Commissioner for prizes in 1705. He married Godolphin's niece on 18 September 1705, at Lambeth. She was Anne Boscowen, eldest daughter of Edward Boscawen of Cornwall and his wife Jael Godolphin, the daughter of Sir Francis Godolphin.

Evelyn succeeded his grandfather, the diarist John Evelyn, to Wotton on 27 February 1706. In August 1708 he surrendered his two government places when he was appointed joint Postmaster General which he held until 1715.

Evelyn had been advised by his grandfather, that if he sought electoral success, to do so 'without affectation and vainglory .. or the being carried away by a faction or to serve a party'. His politics were therefore difficult to pin down. In 1705, he led his family's tenants to vote for the Tory in protest against the corruption of the Whig financier Sir William Scawen. He was returned as Member of Parliament for Helston which was dominated by his Whig patron Godolphin, at a by election on 15 December 1708. He supported the Whigs over the naturalization of the Palatines in 1709, and then voted for the impeachment of Dr Sacheverell in 1710. He did not stand at the 1710 British general election but managed to keep his office under the new ministry. He tended to show local support for the Tories. On 6 August 1713, he was created a baronet of Wotton in the County of Surrey in the Baronetage of Great Britain.

After the Whig Administration came to power in 1715 he lost his place at the Post Office within a few months. In December 1717 he stood for Parliament again at a by-election for Surrey, but was unsuccessful against the Onslow interest. In 1721 he regained ministerial favour from Walpole and was appointed Commissioner of Customs, which he held until 1763.

Evelyn dedicated much of his time to improving the Wootton estate and to scholarly studies. He was elected a Fellow of the Royal Society in January 1723. At Wootton House, he built a private library, 45 feet long, to house the collection of books accumulated over three generations.

== Death and legacy ==
Evelyn and his wife had six sons, of whom three survived to adulthood, and three daughters, of whom two survived to adulthood. His wife died, aged 67, in 1752 and was buried at Wotton on 24 January 1752. Evelyn died on 15 or 18 July 1763, and was buried at Wotton on 22 July. He was succeeded by his eldest son, John. His son William was also MP for Helston and raised a monument to his parents.

== Notes ==
Parliament of Great Britain
Preceded by Sidney Godolphin; Francis Godolphin	Member of Parliament for Helston; 1708–1710; With: Sidney Godolphin	Succeeded by Sidney Godolphin; George Granville
Government offices
Preceded by Sir Thomas Frankland; Sir Robert Cotton	Postmaster General; 1708–1715; With: Sir Thomas Frankland	Succeeded by The Lord Cornwallis; James Craggs
Baronetage of Great Britain
New creation	Baronet (of Wotton); 1713–1763	Succeeded by John Evelyn
