= Scissor section flat =

Arrangement for flats in an apartment block

The scissor section flat is a distinctive way of arranging the flats in an apartment block that was developed in the 1950s by London County Council Architects department. The interlocking design provides a way of maximising the space given to flats in any building volume by reducing the space needed for entrance corridors and providing a dual aspect for each dwelling. When used in high rise tower blocks, the scissor arrangement also makes the lift installation cheaper as a landing is only required every three levels. But the design does have accessibility issues and the complex arrangement has caused confusion for emergency services.

== Design ==
Scissor section flats consist of interlocking designs and typically are a mixture of 'up' flats and 'down' flats.

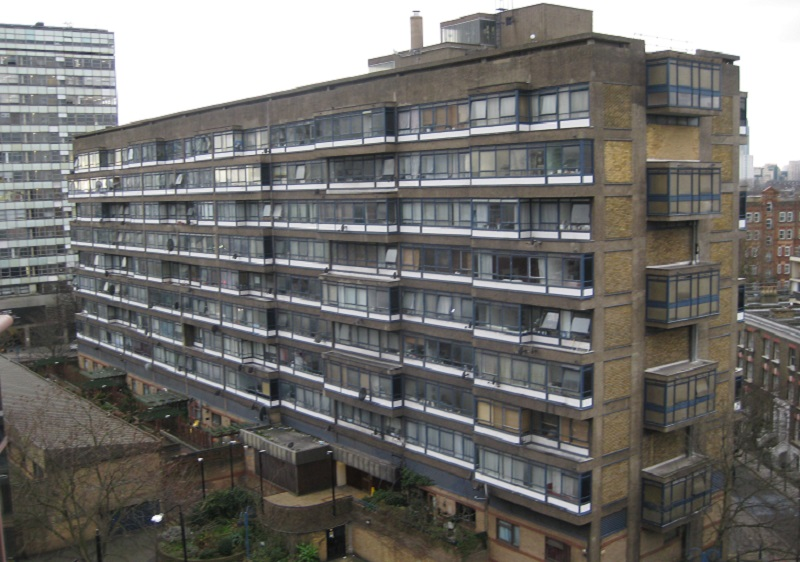
A view of Perronet House, London showing the distinctive 'half floor' arrangement between the internal walkways (shown by the end windows) and the accommodation floors (shown by the side windows)

In an 'up' flat, you enter the flat from a central entrance corridor and go up a half-storey set of stairs to the first 'main' level of the flat, typically containing the living room and kitchen. From there a second half-storey set of stairs goes up to a level containing toilet and bathroom. This sits the storey level above the entrance corridor on the interior of the building, so these rooms have no natural light or ventilation. From the bathroom level a further half-storey set of stairs goes up to the second main level of the flat, typically containing bedrooms, which sits on the other side of the building from the living area. A final half-storey set of stairs leads up to the central corridor two storeys above the entrance, with a fire exit door to that corridor. A 'down' flat has the similar arrangement, but in reverse, with the entrance leading down to the living level, down to the bathroom level, down to the bedroom level and down to the corridor two storeys below.

The result of this layout is that all flats have a dual aspect design, where each apartment faces out on both sides of the block. This maximises light, external views and ventilation for the occupants within a very compact layout. This design builds upon - but subtly differs from - the dual aspect arrangement of interlocking flats pioneered by Le Corbusier in the Unité d'habitation in Marseille (and developed in London council housing designs such as Lakanal House) by arranging the rooms so that all the living accommodation is on one side of the block and all the bedroom accommodation on the other, minimising noise disruption between neighbours.

The diagram shows how two scissor flats interact. The red flat is a 'down' flat - where one enters from the top entrance corridor, down stairs to living area, down to the bathroom area, down to the bedroom area and down to an emergency exit to the lower corridor. The blue flat is an 'up' flat with this arrangement in reverse.

== History ==
The scissor section flat was developed by David Gregory-Jones and his team at LCC Architects department in 1956-57, with details of the design approach published in a technical article in 1962. An early use of the design was in the large riverside towers of the Pepys Estate in Deptford, and in a number of council housing schemes across London in the 1960s and early 1970s including Maydew House, Kelson House and Perronet House. Some similar designs for council tower blocks are found in other cities in England.

== Notable examples ==
- Dawson's Heights by Kate Macintosh, London SE22
- Perronet House, designed by Sir Roger Walters, London SE1
- Aragon Tower, on the Pepys Estate, London SE8
- Corringham, designed by Kenneth Frampton, London W2
- Willoughby House on the Barbican Estate, designed by Chamberlin, Powell and Bon, London EC2
- Westside, Fortis Green, London N2 designed by architect Colin Jones (allegedly the first building in which this arrangement was used)

The scissor section design was also used extensively outside London; in Glasgow, tower blocks at Tarfside, Hutchesontown "B", Ibroxholm, Shawbridge and Woodside also employed the configuration.

== Criticism ==
Some commentators have pointed out that the complex design of scissor section flats leads to a more complex, and costly, construction process while architects have pointed out that the use of so many flights of stairs and the half-storey design means that this form of layout would not meet modern building regulations around accessibility.

The unusual layout of the flats and variety of layouts found in a building have caused confusion to the emergency services, and were identified as a contributory factor during the inquest into the death of two firemen fighting a fire in a scissor section flat in Southampton, England in 2010.
