= HM Victualling Yard, Deptford =

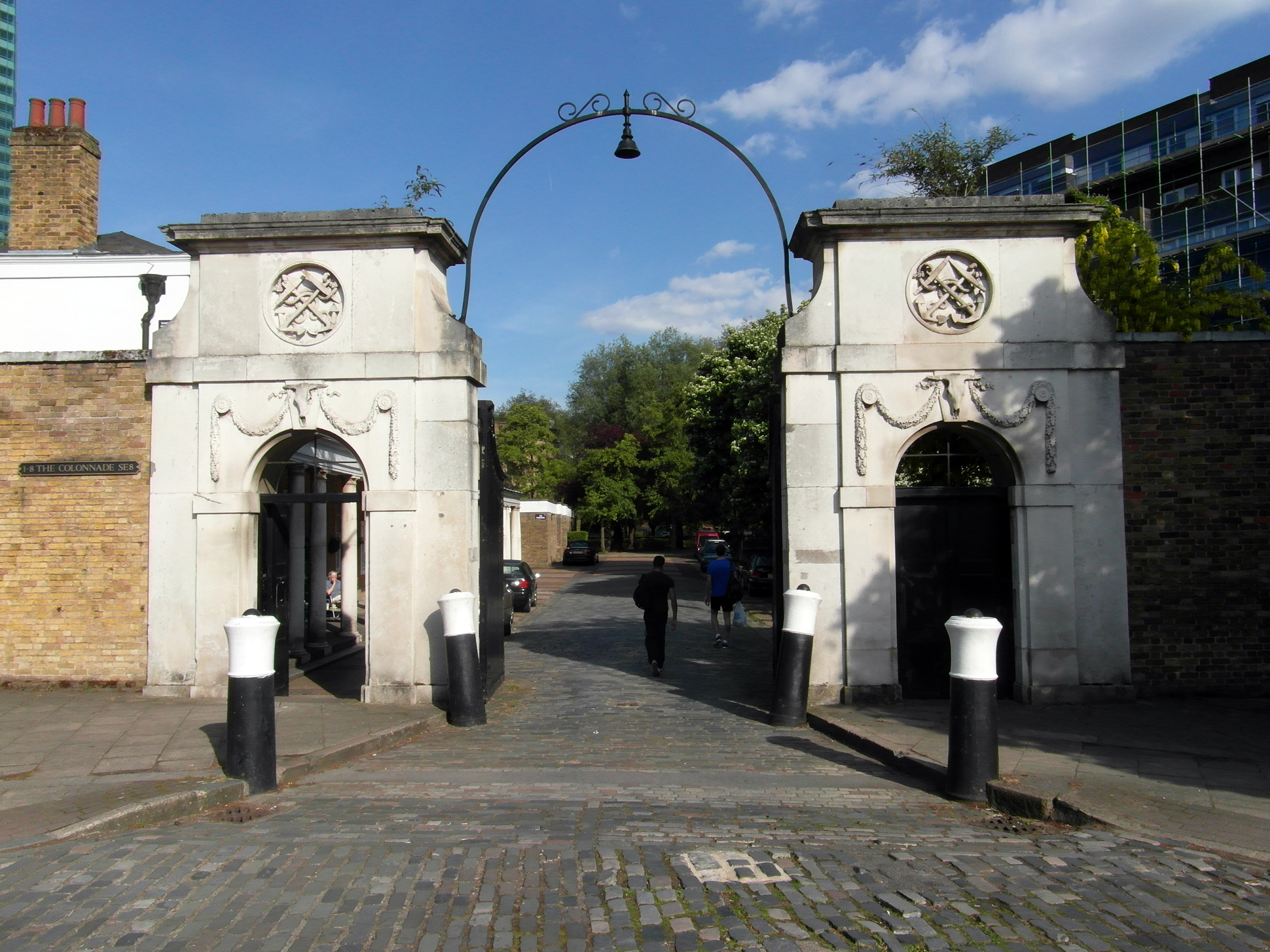
The Main Gate to the former Victualling Yard

HM Victualling Yard, Deptford was Britain's principal naval Victualling Yard. Located next to Deptford Royal Dockyard on the River Thames, it provided victualling services for the Royal Navy for the best part of 300 years (from the mid-17th century through to the early 1960s).

Previously known as the Red House, Deptford, the site with its wharf and storehouses was taken over by the Victualling Commissioners in 1743 to serve as their main operational facility. Rebuilt in the late 18th century, it soon became 'the largest food-processing operation in Britain, if not in Europe'. Beer was brewed on the site, livestock slaughtered for meat, and biscuit, chocolate, mustard, pepper and oatmeal were manufactured there. After 1858 it was formally known as the Royal Victoria Victualling Yard.

Deptford's proximity to the food markets of London made it especially convenient for victualling, and it served the requirements not only of its own neighbouring Dockyard but also those of Woolwich, Sheerness and Chatham, as well as of the fleet and vessels based in the Nore (which was one of the Navy's principal anchorages). In addition, it routinely supplied the other naval victualling yards, both at home and abroad, with items of stock (to supplement those sourced or produced locally) ranging from rum, food and tobacco to clothing and medical supplies.

== Origins: the Red House ==
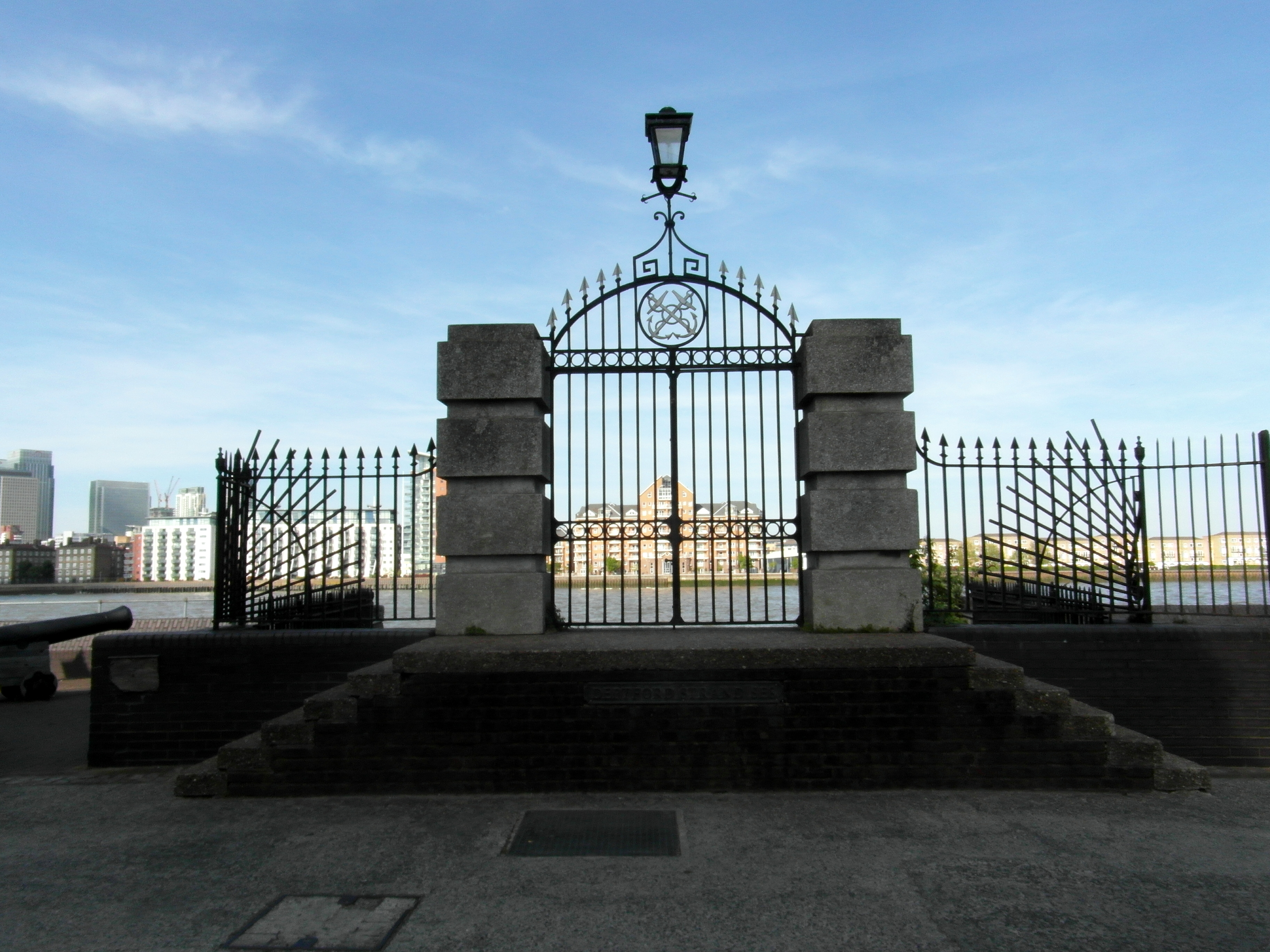
The river gate at the top of 'Drake's Steps', a long-established landing place on Deptford Strand.

In the 17th century the Navy Board's victualling operation was based on Tower Hill in a complex of offices, residences, storehouses and manufactories which had been established in the reign of Elizabeth I. In 1650, to supplement these arrangements, a slaughterhouse was acquired by the Board of Victualling of the Commonwealth Navy, across the river and downstream, at Deptford.

After the Restoration a private contractor, Sir Denis Gauden, was licensed as Surveyor of Marine Victuals. In 1665, with the Navy expanding rapidly, Gauden sought to ease pressure on the facilities at Tower Hill. He leased a property known as the Red House (a red brick storehouse which stood on a wharf adjacent to the Royal Dockyard). It first required rebuilding, having been damaged by fire in 1639; but in 1673 Gauden began to transfer a number of personnel and operations from Tower Hill to Deptford.

The Red House was part of the Sayes Court estate. In the hands of private contractors, it continued to be used for naval victualling for the next 70 years.

== Acquisition and expansion: HM Victualling Yard ==
In 1742 the Victualling Commissioners, supported by the Admiralty, proposed to purchase 11 acres of the Sayes Court estate (including Red House) with the intention of establishing their main depot there. The Privy Council, while approving the new establishment, did not approve the purchase (Sir John Evelyn had wanted £10,000 for the sale), so instead it was leased to the Commissioners for £500 per annum.

The Commissioners took possession the following year; they set about building a large new storehouse (to take items from Tower Hill), re-facing the wharf with bricks and repairing a number of buildings (which had been damaged in a fire a few years beforehand). At the same time, they drew up much more ambitious plans for a comprehensive redevelopment of the 11-acre site designed to consolidate in a single location facilities for the purchase, production, packing and dispatching of foodstuffs, beverages and other victualling supplies for naval use (while also providing residential and office accommodation for the Victualling Commissioners themselves). At the time, this plan (costed at almost £74,000) was purely aspirational; but it provided a framework for ongoing development. In the 1740s a mill for producing oatmeal was built, a cooperage was established for repairing damaged casks, and a perimeter wall was built. In 1747, the Commissioners' bakehouse at Rotherhithe was destroyed in a fire, and the decision was taken to build a new and larger one on site at Deptford.

Fire remained a serious threat in this period. In 1748 the new Victualling Office burned down (the fire started when a spark set light to some sacks hung up to dry by a hearth; it subsequently spread to 'a great number' of staves which had been stacked nearby, and went on to set fire to two lighters on the river which were laden with dry stores ('biscuits, pease, &c.'). In 1755 the King's Mill was destroyed, likewise the New Storehouse in 1758; and 1761 the old Red House (which had been rebuilt in 1640) was once again burned down.

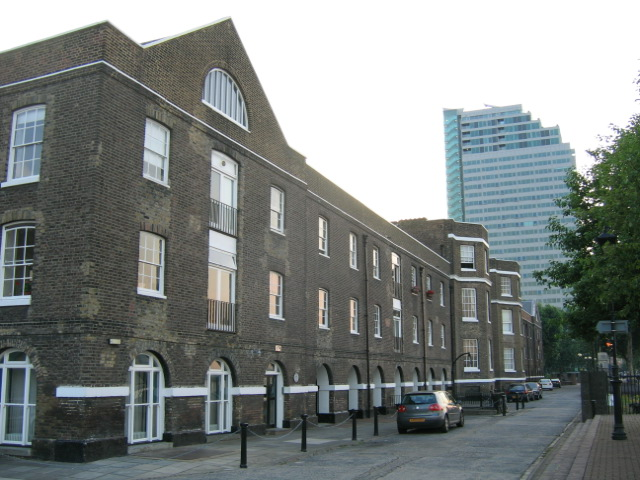
Riverside storehouse and administrative office.

It was only, finally, in the 1780s that HM Victualling Yard, Deptford, acquired the layout, scale and complexity of operations that it was to retain for the best part of the next two centuries. A comprehensive rebuilding took place, to designs by James Arrow (Surveyor to the Victualling Office, 1774–1785). Behind a row of riverside storehouses, the yard's various activities were accommodated in a variety of purpose-built manufacturing areas and specialised storage buildings, arranged around a central open space. To the south was the cooperage (for the manufacture and repair of barrels, in which the great majority of the yard's products were packed for storage and transport). To the west was a large meat processing area, with separate slaughterhouses, cutting houses and packing houses for beef and for pork. To the north, alongside a terrace of houses for senior officers, was a large brewhouse providing beer for the fleet, and towards the centre a bakery with twelve large ovens, which produced bread and ship's biscuits.

In 1785 the Victualling Board closed the Tower Hill depot and Deptford became its centre of operations (though the commissioners themselves did not move to Deptford, instead transferring their office to Somerset House in 1787).

=== Operation ===
Certain provisions were purchased locally and then stored on site, including butter, cheese, peas and fish, as well as malt and hops for brewing and flour for baking. (Initially, flour was milled by the Board in a pair of nearby windmills in Deptford and Rotherhithe, but by 1802 these had been sold as they proved uneconomical.)

Livestock arrived either by boat or else on the hoof, usually from Smithfield Meat Market by way of London Bridge. The slaughterhouses only operated in the cooler months of the year (October–April). Fresh meat (and fresh bread) were provided for ships in harbour or at anchor in the Thames, the Medway and The Nore; but for ships going to sea, salted meat was provided (and biscuit rather than bread). Use was made of by-products: hides to make leather, tallow to make soap and candles, shins and bones to make portable soup.

One characteristic that distinguished Deptford from the Board's other manufacturing facilities (in Portsmouth and Plymouth) was that, in addition to the aforementioned large-scale facilities, Deptford specialised in the production of other foodstuffs on a smaller scale, such as mustard, pepper, oatmeal and chocolate (each prepared in a dedicated milling area). There were also separate storehouses for sugar, tea, rice, raisins, wine and tobacco, all of which were purchased in London and stored in Deptford prior to being distributed for use elsewhere as required.

In the late-18th and early-19th centuries, during the French Revolutionary and Napoleonic Wars, Deptford's main task was to maintain a steady provision of victuals (either by manufacture or purchase) with which to supply the smaller yards on the south coast and overseas where the fleet was principally based.

By 1813 the Victualling Yard at Deptford covered nearly 20 acres. A 10-horsepower steam engine had been installed in the brewhouse; it was used both to grind the malt and to pump beer from the vats. Furthermore, a complex network of pipes carried water from the Ravensbourne Waterworks into various parts of the yard, including the brewhouse, the bakehouse, the pickle-yard and the cooperage. Plugs were installed at various points, in case of fires, and attachments on the wharf-side cranes allowed water to be delivered directly to ships moored alongside. A steam-driven flour mill was introduced in the 1820s and biscuit making was semi-mechanised in the 1830s.

Deptford's integrated approach to manufacture and storage provided a model for the new purpose-built victualling yards established by the Navy in the 1820s: the Royal Clarence Victualling Yard, Gosport (which served Portsmouth and the south-coast anchorages) and the Royal William Victualling Yard, Stonehouse (which served Plymouth and later Gibraltar).

=== Personnel ===
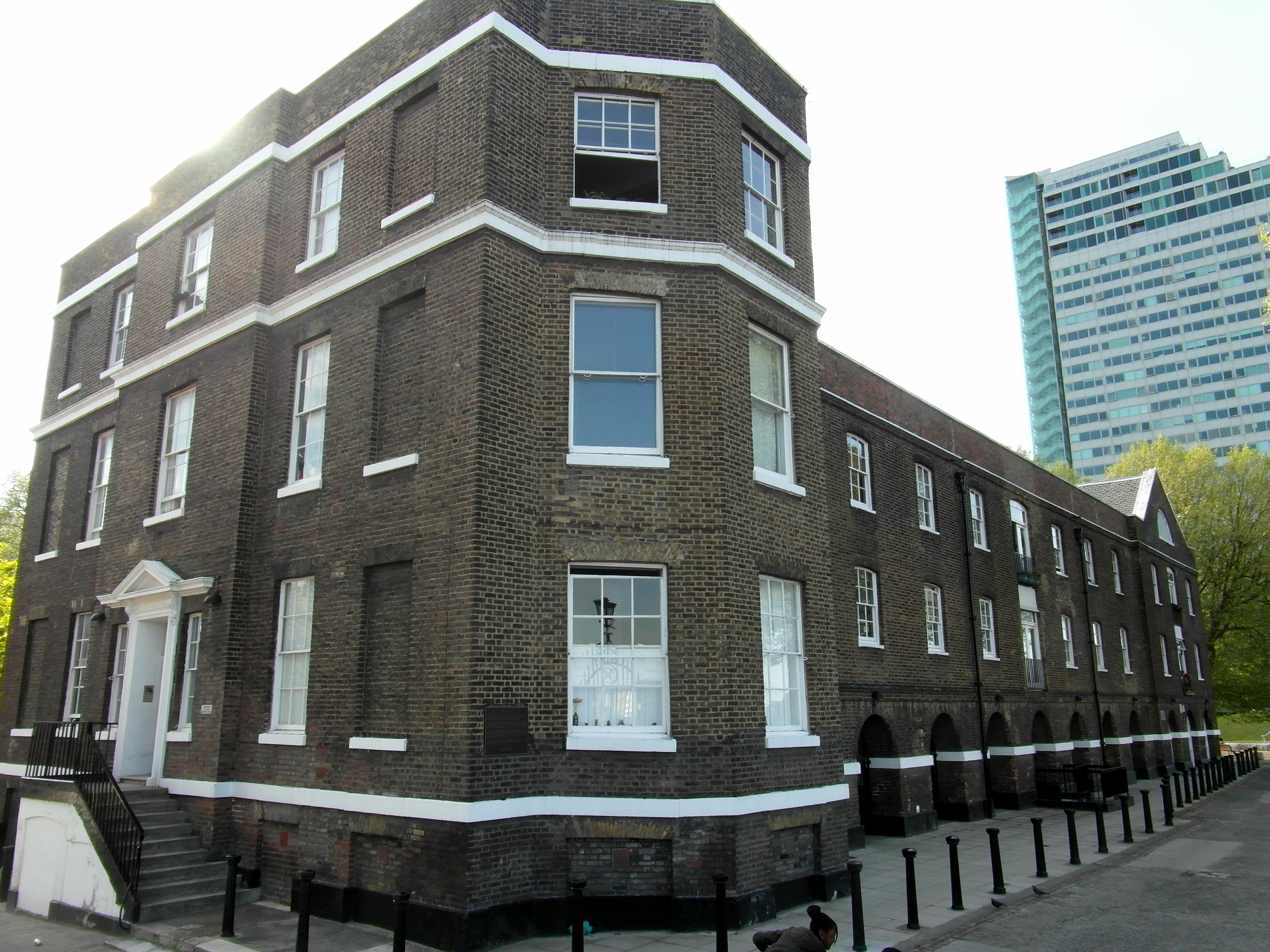
Superintendent's House and riverside storehouse.

The senior personnel of the yard varied over time. Up to 1809, the Principal Officers of the yard were listed as follows:

- Superintendent
- Hoytaker
- Clerk of the Cheque
- Clerk of the Cutting House
- Clerk of the Dry Stores
- Clerk of the Brewhouse
- Master Cooper
- Clerk of the Issues

These officers related directly to their counterparts on the Victualling Board, leading to a lack of co-ordination and accountability in the yard.

In response to this difficulty, a Board of Revision recommended in 1809 that the number of Principal Officers at Deptford be reduced to three:

- Agent Victualler (having overall responsibility for the yard's operation, for negotiating contracts and distribution of victuals)
- Clerk of the Cheque (financial officer)
- Storekeeper (overseer of items in store)

with the following listed as Subordinate Officers:

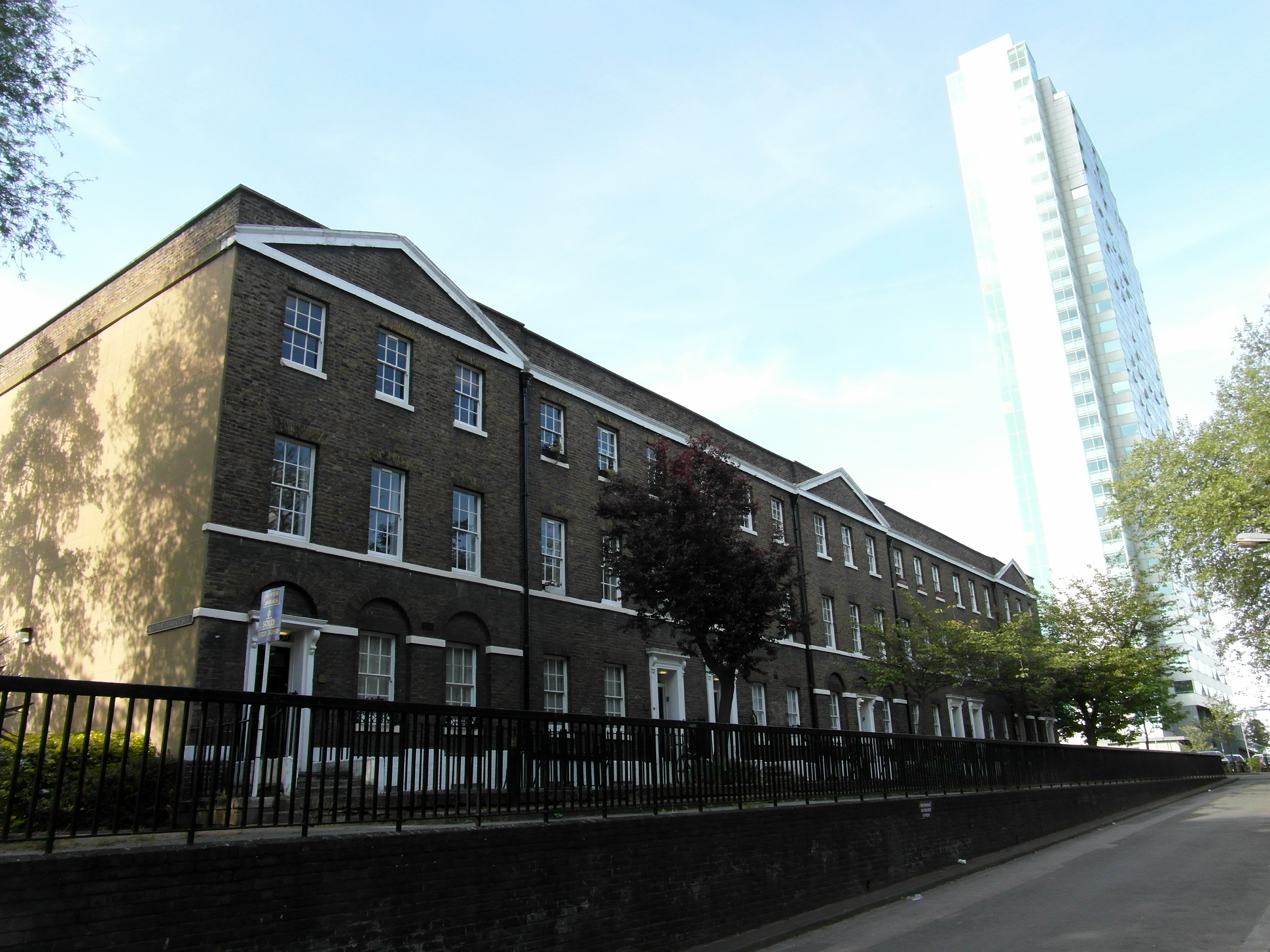
The Terrace (built to house the other senior officers of the yard).

- Master Cooper
- Master Brewer
- Master Baker
- Master Butcher
- Principal Boatswain
- Principal Stevedore
- Inspector of Works
- Porter

In 1832 the Victualling Board was disestablished and the civilian Agent Victualler was replaced with a serving naval officer, the Captain Superintendent, assisted by a Master Attendant. In 1869, these offices were abolished and the Yard was instead placed under the management of a civilian Storekeeper.

== Later years: the Royal Victoria Victualling Yard ==
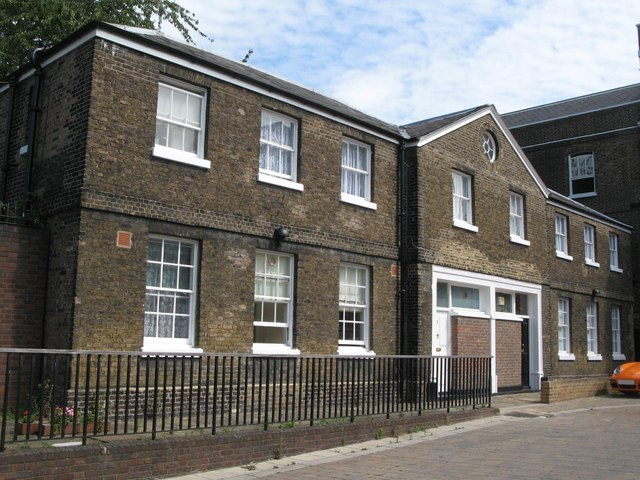
Former stable block behind the Superintendent's house.

Deptford remained the largest of the home victualling establishments through the 19th century. The establishment was renamed the Royal Victoria Victualling Yard in 1858, following a visit by Queen Victoria. Records show that, in 1868, 50 coopers, 7 millers, 21 bakers, 6 blacksmiths, 4 sawyers and 47 other tradesmen were employed at the Yard, together with 22 storemen and 67 labourers. After the closure of Deptford's Royal Dockyard in 1869, the Victualling Yard expanded southwards into the old Dockyard precincts (the boundary wall separating the two Yards had already been removed, in 1852). More store houses were built on the site, and the Dockyard's former mast pond provided additional wharfage. By the end of the century the Royal Victoria Victualling Yard covered a total area of some 35 acres.

From 1872 to 1913, large amounts of meat came from the adjacent Foreign Cattle Market which the City of London had constructed on the site of the Royal Dockyard. With the closure of the market and the start of the First World War, the City sold the site to the government to enable the supply to troops in France.

Brewing ceased in the yard after the beer ration was discontinued in the 1830s; the old brewhouse instead became a clothing store. Rum then became the main alcoholic provision of the Royal Navy and Deptford managed its supply. Rum from the West Indies was purchased at a strength of 'forty degrees above proof' and placed in vats where it was reduced by addition of water to the standard Navy strength of 4.5 degrees under proof. The rum was left to age in the vats for around two years before being run into casks ready for despatch. By the end of the nineteenth century the vats at Deptford were 32 in number, providing a total capacity of 230,000 gallons. The other main beverage provided to sailors at this time was chocolate, 1.25 million pounds of which was supplied each year from Deptford's chocolate mills. (Chocolate production, which did not take place at the other home yards, is recorded as taking place at Deptford from 1834). In addition, a 'considerable quantity' of lime juice was stored on site (it was mostly consumed in tropical climates and served as an antiscorbutic).

After the 1870s live animals were no longer brought into the yard for slaughter, though fresh meat did continue to be salted on site. By 1900 it was estimated that 'in a year, something like 2,000,000 lb. of beef and pork will probably pass through the Yard'; the pork was from Ireland and Denmark, the beef 'almost entirely from America'. Inside 'huge meat stores', the meat was salted in 100 lb (45 kg) barrels, to which a small amount of brine was added day by day, after which they were hermetically sealed ready for despatch.

The biscuit bakery, staffed by just twelve men, could produce 30,000 ship's biscuits a day (though it only normally operated in the winter months). Around 450 tons per year were being manufactured in Deptford in 1900 (with biscuit-making also undertaken at the other two principal Victualling Yards). Grain was bought on the open market, and stored on site in a three-storey granary before being transferred to the steam-powered flour mill. In the course of manufacture, each hexagonal biscuit was stamped with the Government's broad arrow and the letter 'D' for Deptford. After baking, the biscuits were placed for three days in the upper-floor drying rooms, which were heated to 140 °F (60 °C) using surplus heat from the ovens downstairs. It was claimed that Deptford alone could, if needed, 'turn out sufficient biscuits to feed the whole Navy'; enough raw material for 11,000,000 biscuits was kept in stock in the Yard.

Deptford always provided more than just the staple naval provisions of meat, biscuits, rum and cocoa. In the 20th century a whole variety of stores were kept on site, including drugs and medical supplies, soap, lubricating oil and acid, as well as sizeable stocks of tea, sugar, jam, salt, raisins, split peas and preserved milk (each kept in their own dedicated storehouse). Oatmeal, pepper and mustard continued to be milled on site. Port wine was provided in quarter-pint bottles for Communion services; it was also supplied as a 'medical comfort', along with 'beef essence, oxtail soup, chicken broth, calf's foot jelly' and assorted other consumables. Ships were also supplied with tobacco, which was purchased in bulk and compressed into barrels using hydraulic machinery.

Foodstuffs and other items continued to be stored in barrels: 30,000 a year were being manufactured at Deptford's cooperage in the early 20th century. By the 1870s, machinery for cask-making had been installed by Greenwood & Batley; but certain types of cask and other items were still hand-crafted, and in addition to barrels, the cooperage supplied 'all the wooden paraphernalia of the ship's kitchen'. Tinned food had been available to the Navy since 1813, but for a long time its use was restricted for reasons of cost.

In the early 20th century, if a Royal Navy ship required provisions her officers would order them directly from the nearest appropriate Victualling Yard. From Deptford, supplies were routinely conveyed downriver in lighters to Sheerness, where they could more easily be transferred on to ships. The Royal Victoria Yard was also served by a branch of the London, Brighton and South Coast Railway, which enabled supplies to be delivered to the other home Victualling Yards (or to any other port where they might be required). Provisions for overseas stations were sent as regular freight.

From 1869 the Admiralty Compass Observatory was located in the yard, housed within a small wooden hut erected for the purpose on the lawn at the centre of the site. Its Superintendent was housed in the Terrace. Responsible for testing and ensuring the individual accuracy of every compass in naval service, it remained based in the yard for almost 50 years.

== Closure ==
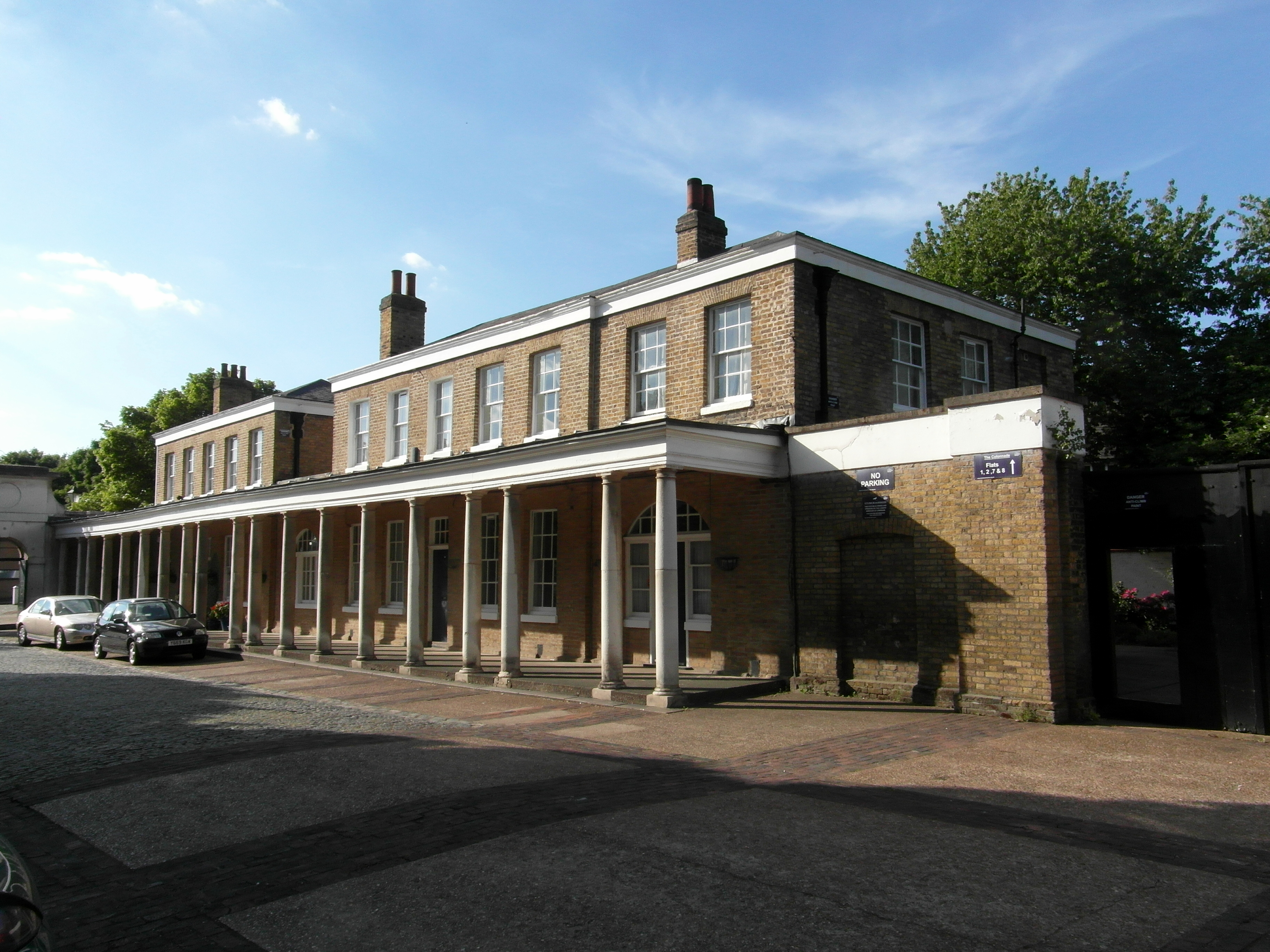
The Colonnade (just inside the main gate: housed the Porter and the Inspector of Works).

A. Cecil Hampshire wrote in the early 1970s:

By the end of the Second World War the yard had become less and less of a storehouse, the functions of its staff being chiefly confined to inspecting and checking the quality.. of victualling stores.. all of which are today supplied by commercial firms. Certain quantities of dry and refrigerated provisions continued however to be held in stock, together with materials and uniform clothing, flying clothing and special cold-weather kit. At the final closure these were transferred to.. Portsmouth and Plymouth.

The Royal Victoria Victualling Yard closed in June 1961. Some staff (and stores) were relocated to the adjacent Army Supply Reserve Depot (which occupied part of the former Dockyard site). The majority of the old Victualling Yard buildings were demolished; a large council estate, the Pepys Estate, was built on the site. Some historic buildings, all dating from the 1770-80s, were retained and converted for housing or community uses. These include the gateway on Grove Street and behind it the 'Colonnade' (former houses and office, fronted by a colonnaded passageway), the terrace of former officers' houses on Longshore and the two former Storehouses on the riverbank.

== See also ==
- Deptford Dockyard
- Royal Clarence Victualling Yard
- Royal William Victualling Yard
- Victualling Commissioners
