= Royal Albert =

Royal Albert may refer to several places named in memory of Prince Albert of Saxe-Coburg and Gotha:

- Royal Albert Hall, London
- Royal Albert Bridge, near Plymouth, England
- Royal Albert Dock, Liverpool, England
- Royal Albert Dock, London
- Royal Albert DLR station, a station on the Docklands Light Railway, London
- Royal Albert, Deptford, a Grade II listed pub in Deptford, South East London

== Other uses ==
- Royal Albert, a brand name for pottery owned by Fiskars and previously by Royal Doulton
- Royal Albert F.C., a Scottish football club, based in Larkhall
- Hawick Royal Albert F.C., another Scottish football club, based in Hawick
- HMS Royal Albert, a 121-gun Royal Navy ship of the line
