= Deptford =

Area of southeast London, England

Coordinates: 51.4780°N 0.0265°W

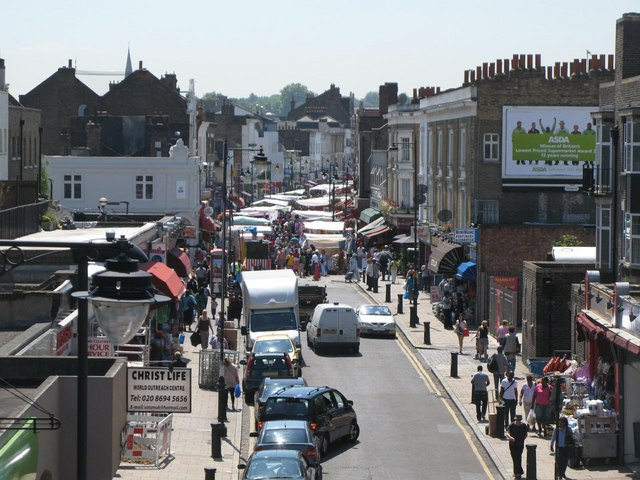
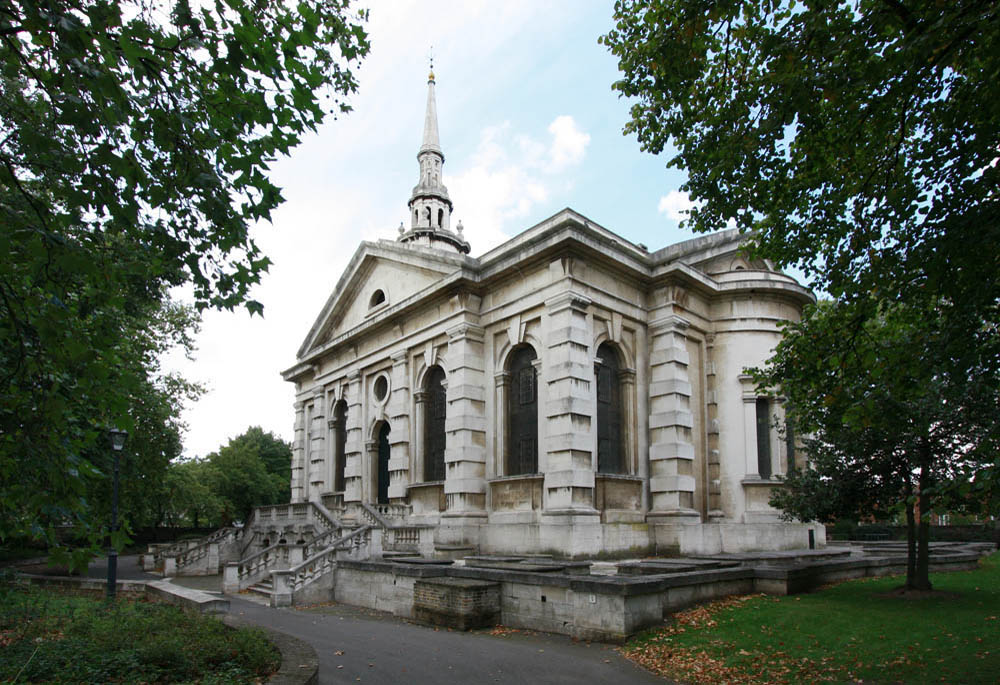
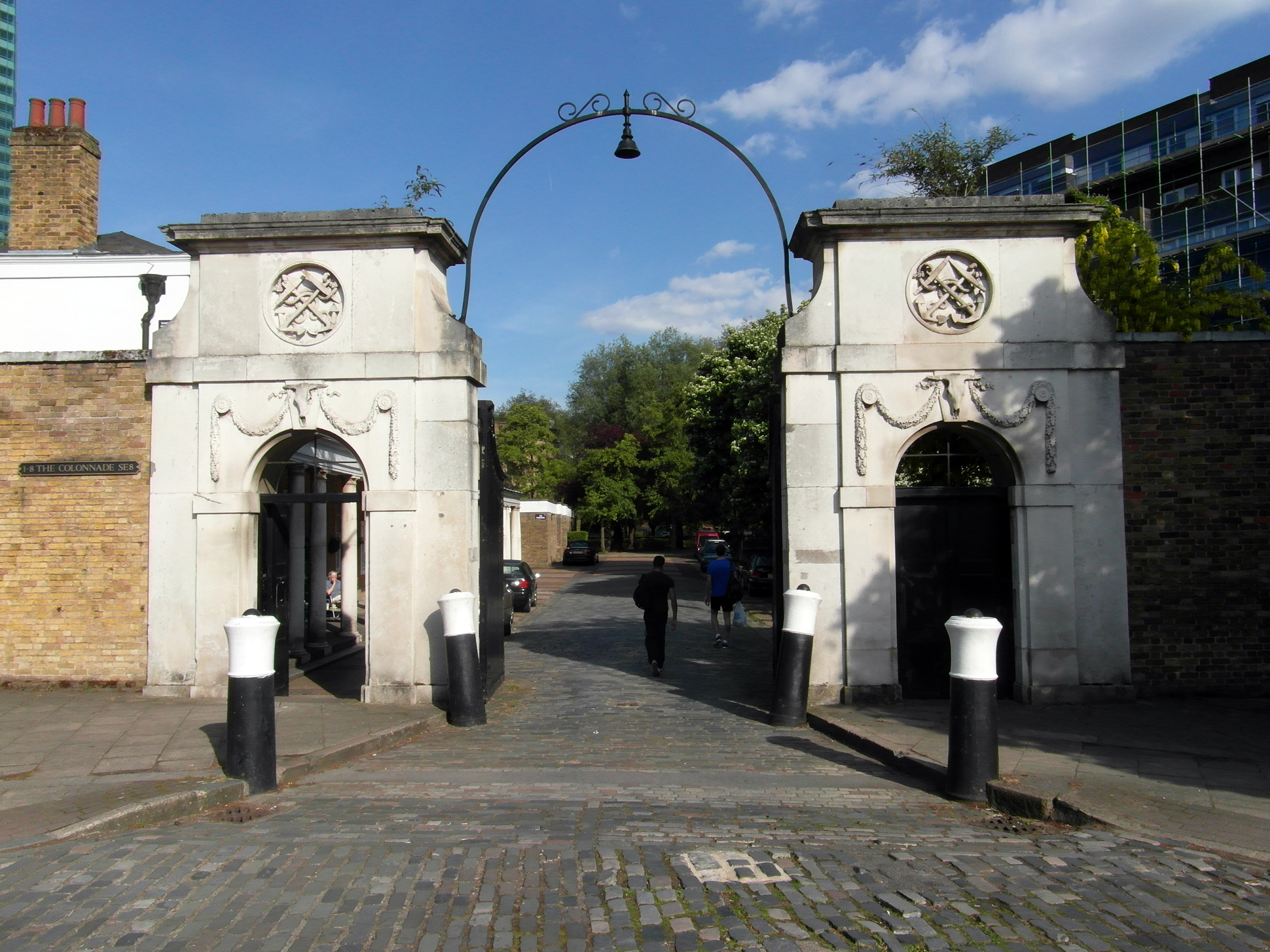
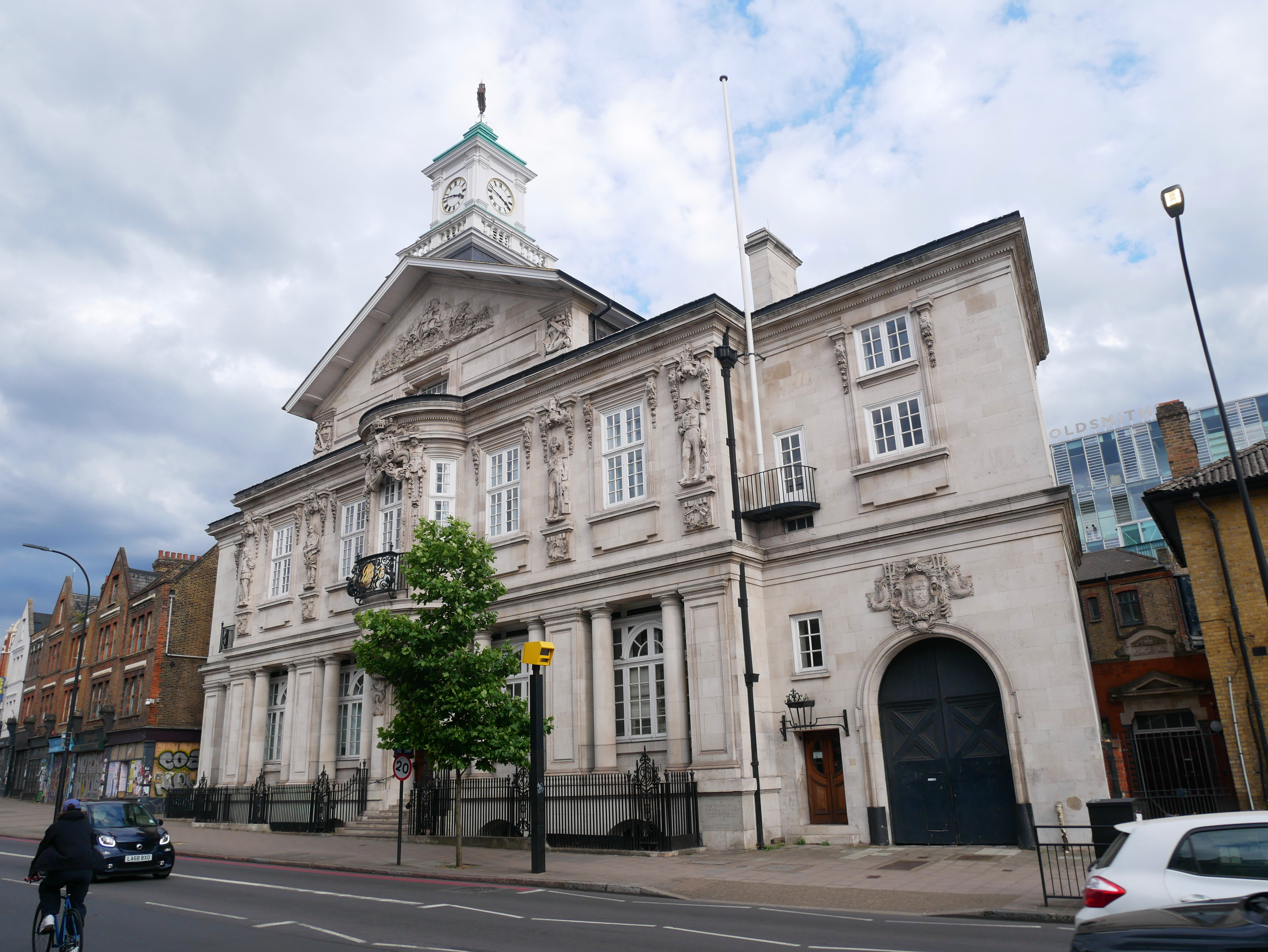
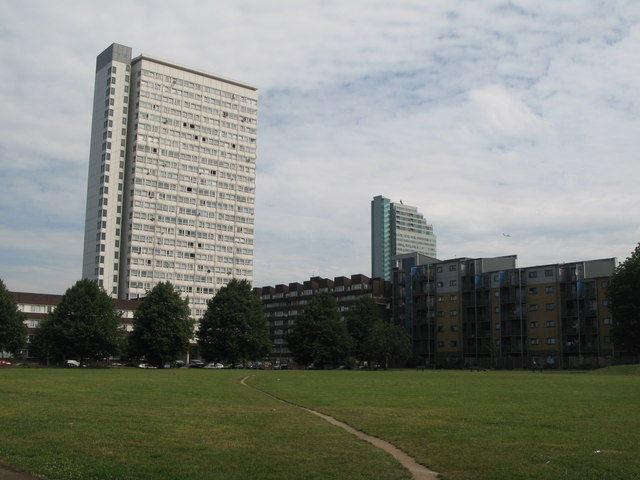
- Deptford High Street St Paul's Church Victualling Yard Deptford Town Hall Pepys Estate Deptford Anchor

- Location within Greater London
- OS grid reference: TQ365775
  - Charing Cross: 4.7 mi (7.6 km) WNW
- London borough: Lewisham; Greenwich
- Ceremonial county: Greater London
- Region: London
- Country: England
- Sovereign state: United Kingdom
- Post town: LONDON
- Postcode district: SE8
- Dialling code: 020
- Police: Metropolitan
- Fire: London
- Ambulance: London
- UK Parliament: Lewisham North
- London Assembly: Greenwich and Lewisham; Greenwich and Lewisham

Deptford (/ˈdɛtfərd/ DET-furd) is an area on the south bank of the River Thames in southeast London, in the Royal Borough of Greenwich and London Borough of Lewisham. It is named after a ford of the River Ravensbourne. From the mid 16th century to the late 19th it was home to Deptford Dockyard, the first of the Royal Dockyards. This was a major shipbuilding dock and attracted Peter the Great to come and study shipbuilding. Deptford and the docks are associated with the knighting of Sir Francis Drake by Queen Elizabeth I aboard the Golden Hind, the legend of Sir Walter Raleigh laying down his cape for Elizabeth, Captain James Cook's third voyage aboard HMS Resolution, and the mysterious apparent murder of Christopher Marlowe in a house along Deptford Strand.

Though Deptford began as two small communities, one at the ford, and the other a fishing village on the Thames, Deptford's history and population has been mainly associated with the docks established by Henry VIII. The two communities grew together and flourished during the period when the docks were the main administrative centre of the Royal Navy, and some grand houses like Sayes Court, home to diarist John Evelyn, and Stone House on Lewisham Way, were erected. The area declined as first the Royal Navy moved out, and then the commercial docks themselves declined until the last dock, Convoys Wharf, closed in 2000.

A Metropolitan Borough of Deptford existed from 1900 until 1965, when the area became part of the newly created London Borough of Lewisham.

== History ==
=== Ancient ===
Deptford took its name from a ford across the Ravensbourne (near what is now Deptford Bridge DLR station) along the route of the Celtic trackway which was later paved by the Romans and developed into the medieval Watling Street. The modern name is a corruption of "deep ford".

Deptford was part of the pilgrimage route from London to Canterbury used by the pilgrims in Chaucer's late 14th century Canterbury Tales, including a mention in the prologue to "The Reeve's Tale". The ford developed into first a wooden then a stone bridge, and in 1497 saw the Battle of Deptford Bridge, in which rebels from Cornwall, led by Michael An Gof, marched on London protesting against punitive taxes, but were soundly beaten by the forces of King Henry VII.

=== Early modern ===
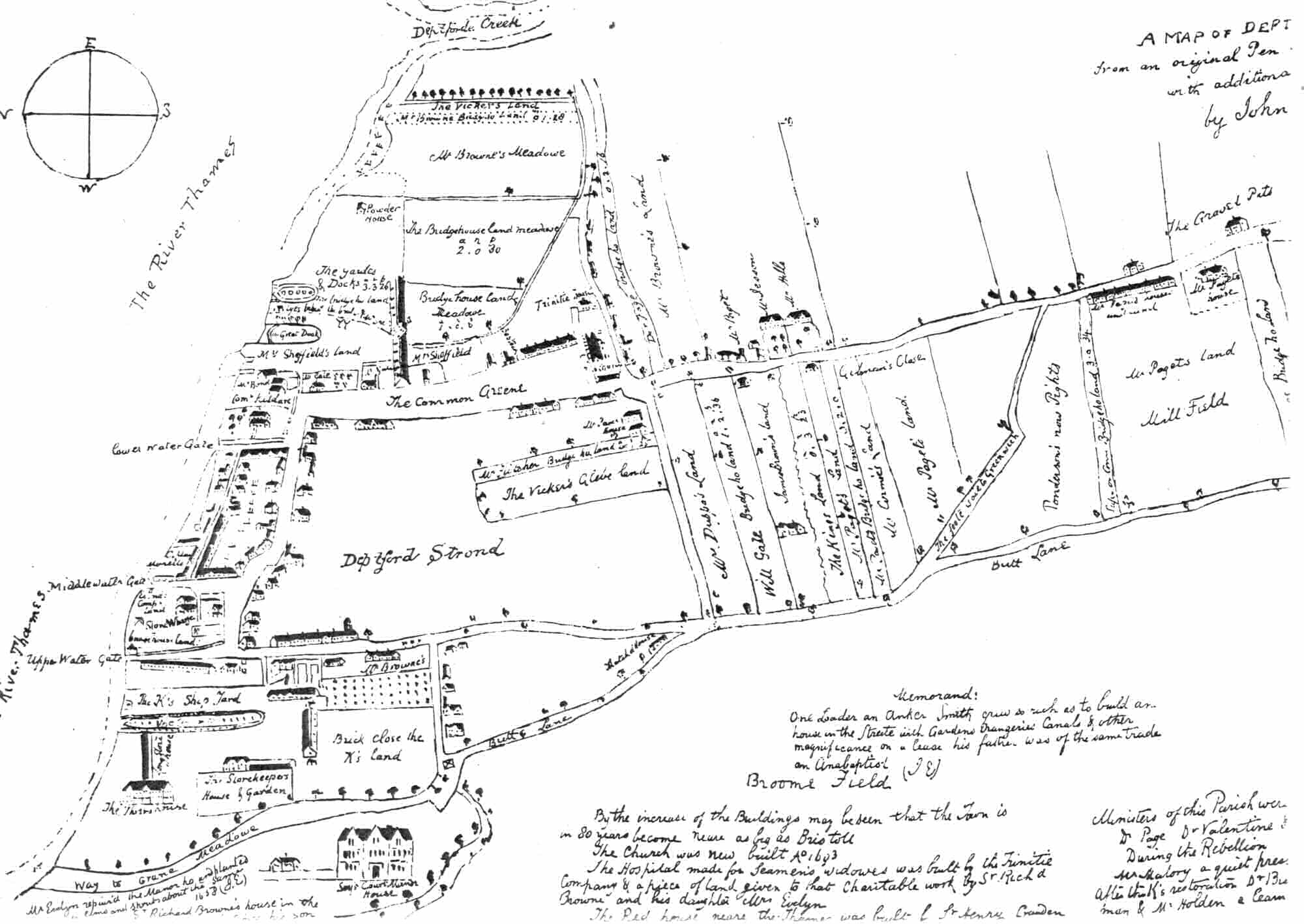
A 1623 map of Deptford Strond with annotations by John Evelyn showing Sayes Court in the bottom-left corner, and Deptford Green as "The Common Greene" just above centre left (click for larger version)

A second settlement, Deptford Strand or Deptford Strond, developed as a modest fishing village on the Thames until Henry VIII used that site for a royal dock for repairing, building and supplying ships, after which it grew in size and importance, shipbuilding remaining in operation until March 1869.

Trinity House, the organisation concerned with the safety of navigation around the British Isles, was formed in Deptford in 1514, with its first Master being Thomas Spert, captain of the Mary Rose. It moved to Stepney in 1618. The name "Trinity House" derives from the church of Holy Trinity and St Clement, which adjoined the dockyard.

The Thames at Deptford was the scene of an aquatic pageant and water tournament on 19 June 1550 devised by Edward Clinton, 1st Earl of Lincoln, for Edward VI. The first part of the entertainment saw combatants strive to throw their opponents into the river. After supper, a pretend fortress built on a boat and defended by William Wynter and a galley was attacked by sailors in four pinnaces. After a fire fight, Clinton won the castle.

Originally separated by market gardens and fields, the two settlements merged over the years, with the docks becoming an important part of the Elizabethan exploration. Queen Elizabeth I visited the royal dockyard on 4 April 1581 to knight the adventurer Francis Drake. As well as for exploration, Deptford was important for trade – the Honourable East India Company had a yard in Deptford from 1607 until late in the 17th century, later (1825) taken over by the General Steam Navigation Company. It was also connected with the slave trade, John Hawkins using it as a base for his operations, and Olaudah Equiano, the slave who became an important part of the abolition of the slave trade, was sold from one ship's captain to another in Deptford around 1760.

Diarist John Evelyn lived in Deptford at Sayes Court, the manor house of Deptford, from 1652 after he had married the daughter of the owner of the house, Sir Richard Browne. After the Restoration, Evelyn obtained a 99-year lease of the house and grounds, and laid out meticulously planned gardens in the French style, of hedges and parterres. In its grounds was a cottage at one time rented by master woodcarver Grinling Gibbons. After Evelyn had moved to Surrey in 1694, Peter the Great, the Russian tsar, studied shipbuilding for three months in 1698 while staying at Sayes Court. Evelyn was angered at the antics of the tsar, who got drunk with his friends who, using a wheelbarrow with Peter in it, rammed their way through a "fine holly hedge". Sayes Court was demolished in 1728-9 and a workhouse built on its site. Part of the estates around Sayes Court were purchased in 1742 for the building of the Navy Victualling Yard, which was renamed the Royal Victoria Victualling Yard in 1858 after a visit by Queen Victoria. This massive facility included warehouses, a bakery, a cattleyard/abattoir and sugar stores, and closed in 1961. All that remains is the name of Sayes Court Park, accessed from Sayes Court Street off Evelyn Street, not far from Deptford High Street. The Pepys Estate, opened on 13 July 1966, is on the former grounds of the Victualling Yard.

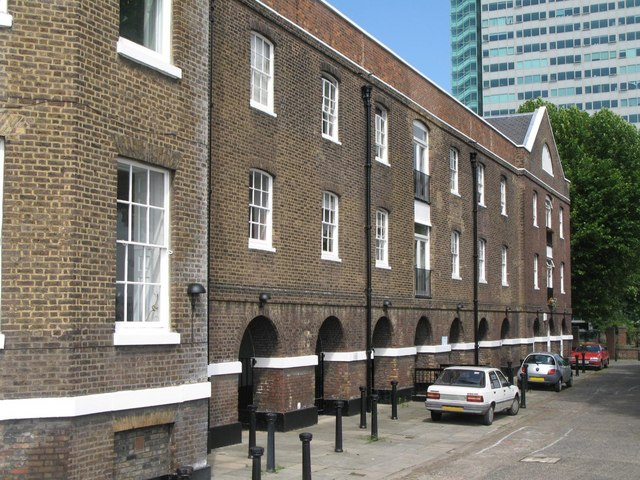
Surviving riverside building of the former Royal Victoria Victualling Yard

The Docks had been gradually declining from the 18th century; the larger ships being built found the Thames difficult to navigate, and Deptford was under competition from the new docks at Plymouth, Portsmouth and Chatham.

=== 19th century ===
When the Napoleonic Wars ended in 1815 the need for a Docks to build and repair warships declined; the Docks shifted from shipbuilding to concentrate on victualling at the Royal Victoria Victualling Yard, and the Royal Dock closed in 1869. From 1871 until 1913 the shipyard site was the City of London Corporation's Foreign Cattle Market, to which live animals were brought by cattle boat from four continents and from whence came about half of London's meat supply.

=== 20th century ===
The yard was taken over by the War Office in 1914, and was an Army Supply Reserve Depot in the First and Second World Wars. The site lay unused until being purchased by Convoys (newsprint importers) in 1984, and eventually came into the ownership of News International. In the mid-1990s, although significant investment was made on the site, it became uneconomic to continue using it as a freight wharf. In 2008 Hutchison Whampoa bought the 16ha site from News International with plans for a £700m 3,500-home development scheme. The Grade II listed Olympia Warehouse will be refurbished as part of the redevelopment of the site.

Deptford experienced economic decline in the 20th century with the closing of the docks, and the damage caused by the bombing during the Blitz in the Second World War – in November 1944 a V-2 rocket destroyed a Woolworths store in New Cross Gate, killing 160 people - contributing to the 703 civilian deaths caused by enemy action within Deptford Metropolitan Borough throughout the war. High unemployment caused some of the population to move away as the riverside industries closed down in the late 1960s and early 1970s.

=== 21st century ===
The local council have developed plans with private companies to regenerate the riverside area, and the town centre.

== Governance ==
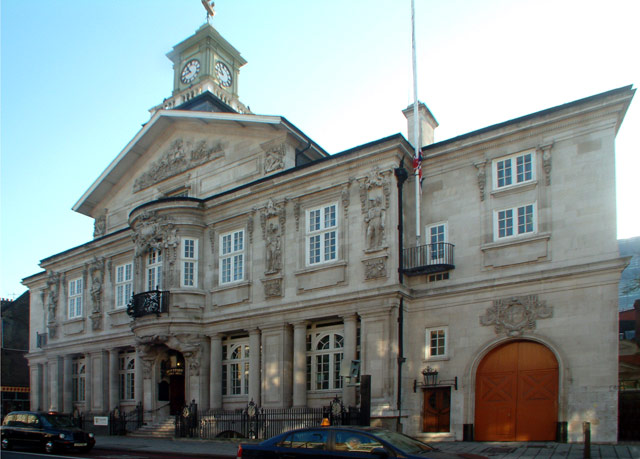
Former Deptford Town Hall, now part of Goldsmiths College

The Manor of Deptford or West Greenwich was bestowed by William the Conqueror upon Gilbert de Magminot or Maminot, bishop of Lisieux, one of the eight barons associated with John de Fiennes for the defence of Dover Castle. Maminot held the head of his barony at Deptford and according to John Lyon writing in 1814, he built himself a castle, or castellated mansion at Deptford. The location of the building is not known, but ancient foundations found on the brow of Broomfield, near the Mast Dock and adjacent to Sayes Court may be the remains of the building.

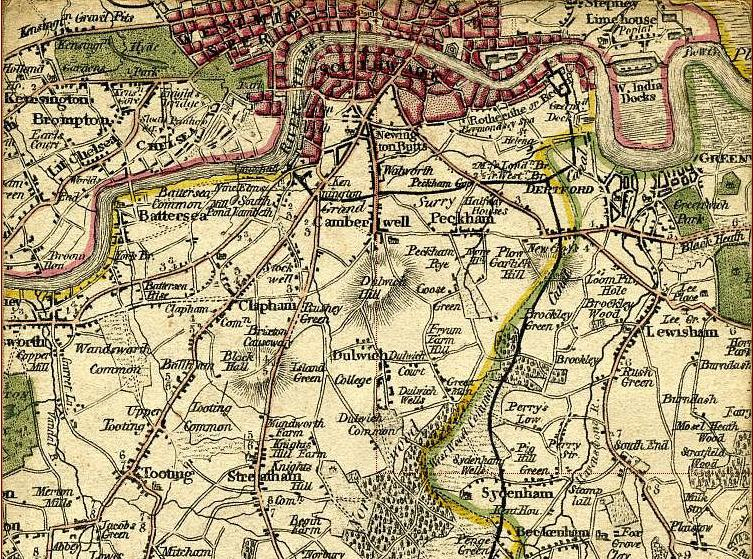
South of London in 1800. The border between Surrey and Kent is shown running through Deptford, with parts of the area in each county.

Deptford was mostly located in the Blackheath Hundred of the county of Kent, with the Hatcham part in the Brixton Hundred of Surrey.

In 1730 Deptford was divided into the two parishes of St Nicholas and St Paul. It was also referred to as West Greenwich, with the modern town of Greenwich being referred to as East Greenwich until this use declined in the 19th century. The whole of Deptford came within the Metropolitan Police District in 1830 and was included in the area of responsibility of the Metropolitan Board of Works in 1855.

It was transferred to the County of London in 1889. Originally under the governance of the ancient parishes of St Paul and St Nicholas, in 1900, a Metropolitan Borough of Deptford was formed out of the southern parish of St Paul, with St Nicholas and the area around the Royal Dockyard coming under the governance of the Metropolitan Borough of Greenwich.

Under the London Government Act 1963, the Metropolitan Borough of Deptford was absorbed in 1965 into the newly created London Borough of Lewisham, with the Deptford St Nicholas area becoming part of the Royal Borough of Greenwich, with both these new boroughs now forming part of the new Greater London body. In 1994 the bulk of the northern part, including the former Royal Dockyard area, was transferred to Lewisham, an adjustment of about 40 hectares (99 acres), leaving only the north eastern area, around St Nicholas's church, in Greenwich.

Deptford is split between two electoral wards - Evelyn in the north and part of New Cross to the south. Following public consultation, the Local Government Boundary Commission for England recommended in June 2020 that the Deptford wards (Evelyn and New Cross) should be unified and renamed Deptford.

== Geography ==
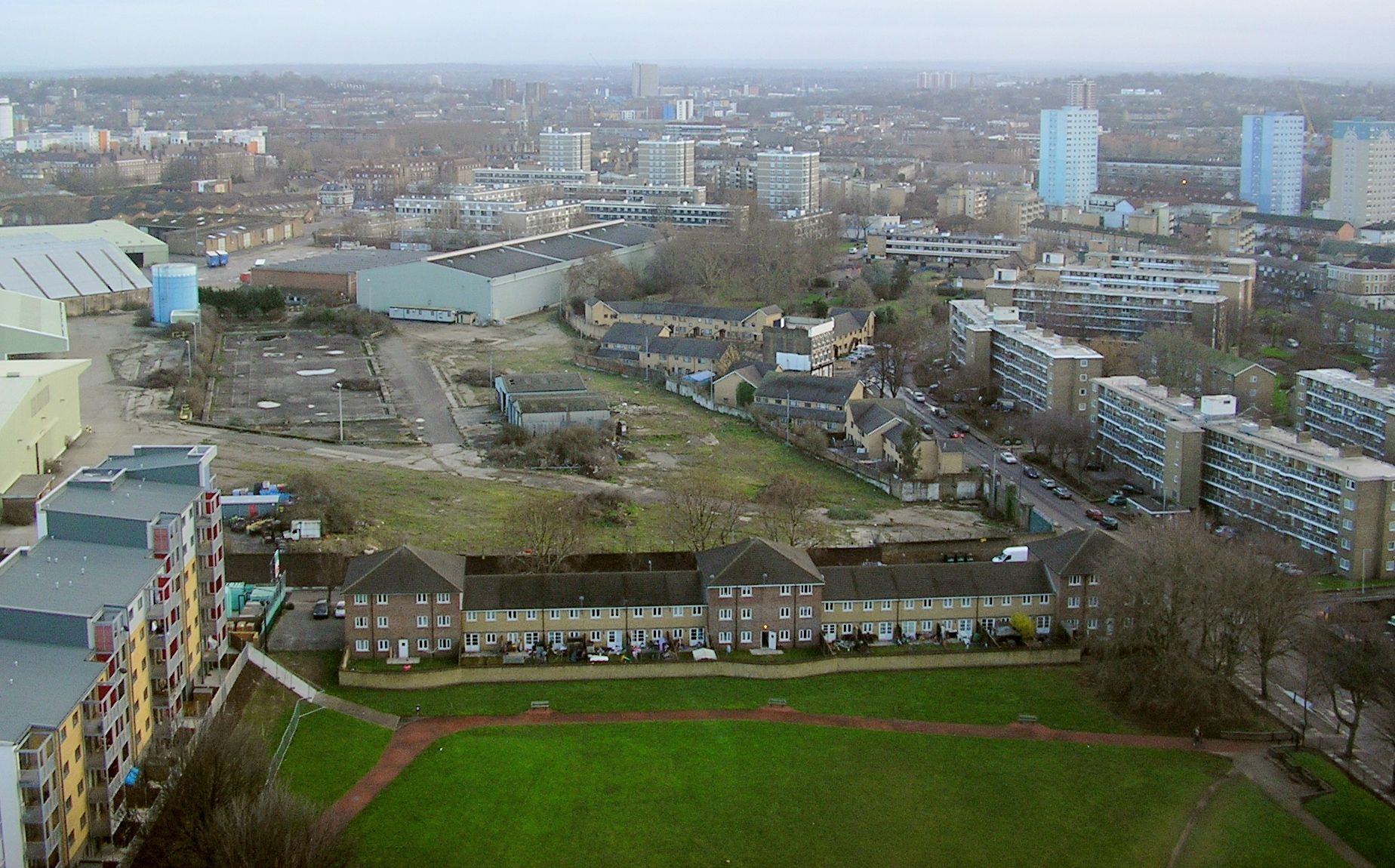
View of Pepys Park, Convoys Wharf, Sayes Court, and over Deptford towards Lewisham

Deptford borders the areas of Brockley and Lewisham to the south, New Cross to the west and Rotherhithe to the north west; the Ravensbourne river divides it from Greenwich to the east, and the Thames separates the area from the Isle of Dogs to the north east; it is contained within the London SE8 post code area. The area referred to as North Deptford is the only part of the London Borough of Lewisham to front the Thames and is sandwiched between Rotherhithe and Greenwich. Much of this riverside estate is populated by the former Naval Dockyards, now known as Convoys Wharf, the Pepys Estate and some southern fringes of the old Surrey Commercial Docks.

The name Deptford – anciently written Depeford meaning "deep ford" — is derived from the place where the road from London to Dover, the ancient Watling Street (now the A2), crosses the River Ravensbourne at the site of what became Deptford Bridge at Deptford Broadway. The Ravensbourne crosses under the A2 at roughly the same spot as the Docklands Light Railway (DLR) crosses over; and at the point where it becomes tidal, just after Lewisham College, it is known as Deptford Creek, and flows into the River Thames at Greenwich Reach.

== Demography ==
A cobbled street near the docks, around 1900

Deptford's population has been mainly associated with the docks since the establishment of the Royal Docks by Henry VIII, though there has also been some market gardening and potteries. When the docks were thriving as the main administrative centre of the British Navy, so the area prospered, and fine houses were built for the administrative staff and the skilled shipbuilders, and a few grand houses like Sayes Court and Stone House on Lewisham Way were erected.

There was a start of a demographic shift downwards when the Royal Navy pulled out of Deptford, and the docks moved into storage and freight. The downward shift continued into the 20th century as the local population's dependency on the docks continued: as the docks themselves declined, so did the economic fortune of the inhabitants until the last dock, Convoys Wharf, closed in 2000.

In common with neighbouring areas of South East London, immigrants from the Caribbean settled in Deptford in the 1950s and 1960s.

Deptford's northern section nearest the old docks contains areas of council housing, with some concentrations of people experiencing the forms of deprivation typically associated with the poverty of Inner London. Northern Deptford near the Thames, along with neighbouring New Cross, has been touted as "the new Shoreditch" by some journalists and estate agents paying attention to a trendy arts and music scene that is popular with students and artists. To the south where Deptford rolls into the suburban spread of Brockley, the previously multi-occupancy Victorian houses are being gentrified by young city workers and urban professionals. Deptford has a growing Vietnamese community reflected in the number of restaurants in the area.

Deptford contains a number of student populations, including those of Goldsmiths College, the University of Greenwich, Bellerbys College and Laban Dance Centre. Goldsmiths College's hall of residence, Rachel McMillan, in Creek Road was sold in 2001 for £79 million, and was subsequently demolished and replaced with the McMillan Student Village which opened in 2003 and provides accommodation for approximately 970 students of the University of Greenwich, Trinity Laban and Bellerbys colleges.

== Economy ==
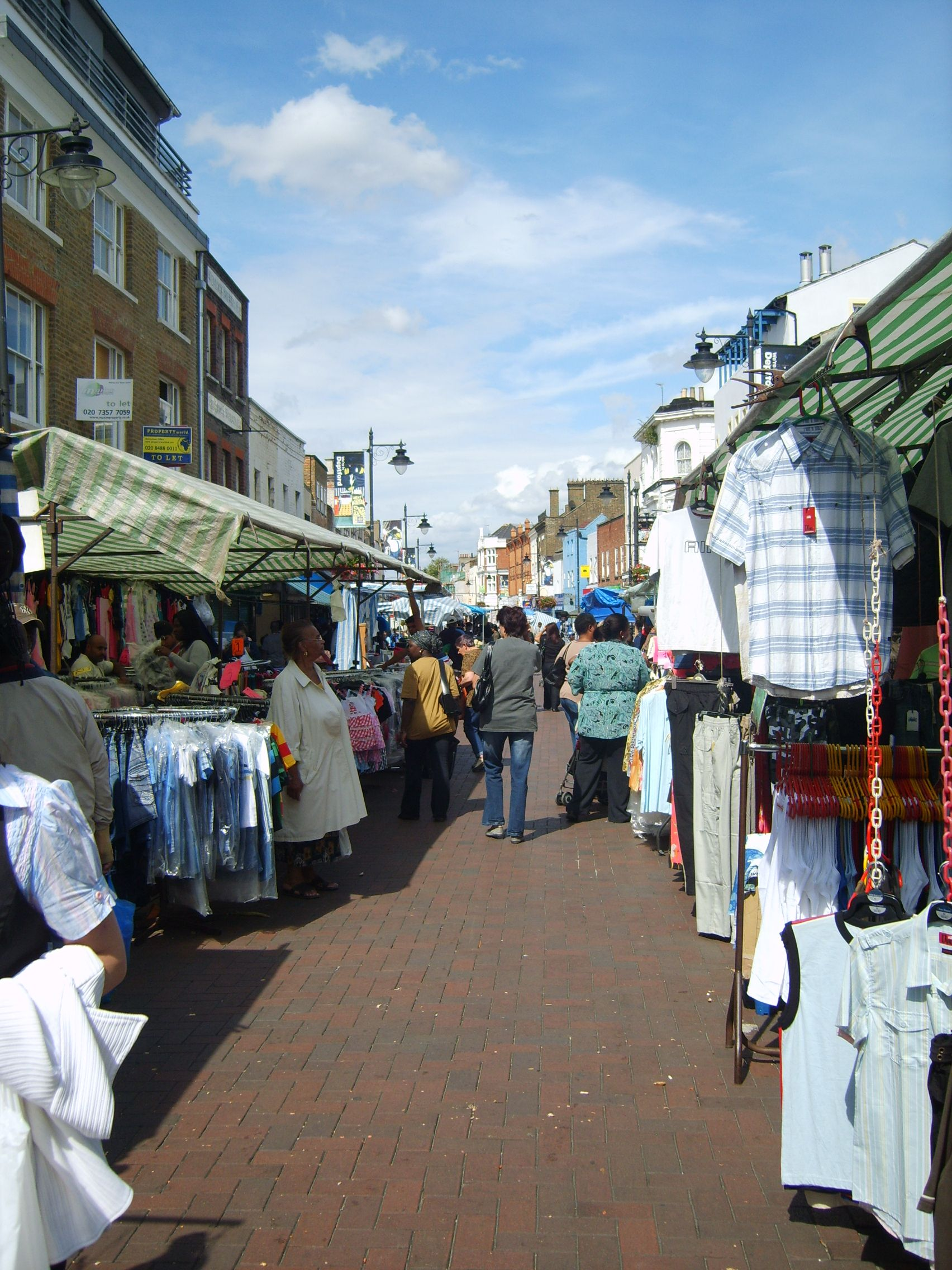
Clothes stalls in Deptford Market

Deptford's economic history has been strongly connected to the Dockyard - when the Dockyard was thriving, so Deptford thrived; with the docks now all closed, Deptford has declined economically. However, areas of Deptford are being gradually re-developed and gentrified - and the local council has plans to regenerate the riverside and the town centre. A large former industrial site by the Thames called Convoys Wharf is scheduled for redeveloping into mixed use buildings. This will involve the construction of around 3,500 new homes and an extension of the town centre northwards towards the river.

The site of a former foundry (established in 1881 by J. Stone & Co in Arklow Road) which closed in 1969 is being redeveloped for commercial and residential use.

Much of the area along Creek Road, close to Greenwich, has also been redeveloped, with the demolition of the old Deptford Power Station and Rose Bruford College buildings. Aragon Tower on the Pepys Estate was sold by Lewisham Borough to fund regeneration plans for the estate; the award-winning refurbishment into privately owned accommodation was featured in the BBC One documentary, "The Tower".

Deptford Market, a street market in Deptford High Street sells a range of goods, and is considered one of London's liveliest street markets. In February 2005, the High Street was described as "the capital's most diverse and vibrant high street" by Yellow Pages business directory, using a unique mathematical formula.

== Culture ==
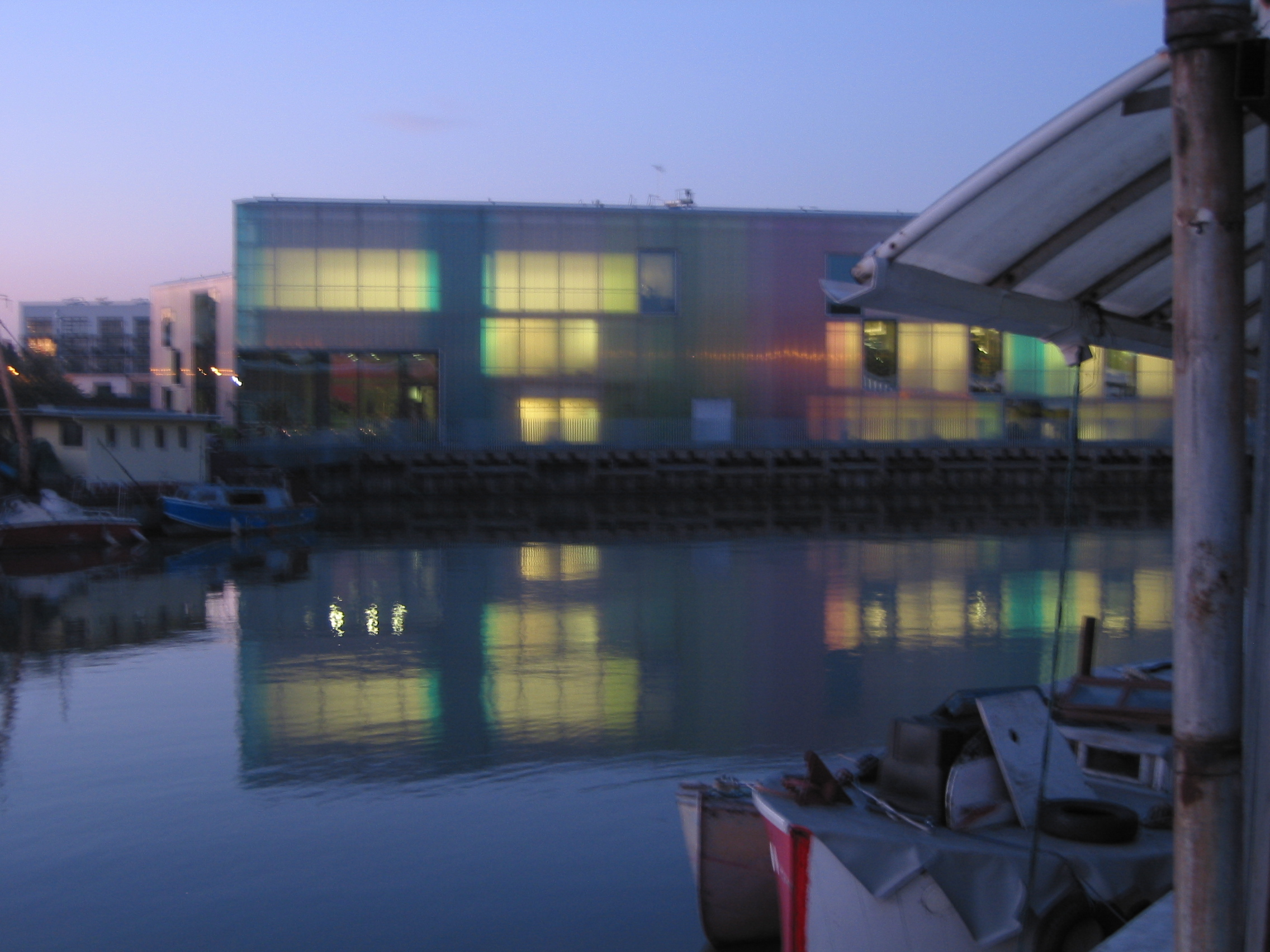
The Laban Dance Centre

The Albany Theatre, a community arts centre with a tradition of "radical community arts and music" including holding 15 "Rock Against Racism" concerts, has its roots in a charity established in 1894 to improve the social life of Deptford's deprived community. The original building, the Albany Institute, was opened in 1899 on Creek Road, changing its name in the 1960s to the Albany Empire. It was burnt down in 1978, but rebuilt on Douglas Way, with Prince Charles laying the foundation stone, and Diana, Princess of Wales opening it in 1982.

Deptford Cinema is a volunteer run, not-for-profit, community cinema, art gallery, and occasional music venue, open since late 2014 and located at 39 Deptford Broadway. At the time of opening it was the borough of Lewisham's only functioning cinema.

Creekside, a regeneration area beside Deptford Creek, is used for educational and artistic purposes, such as the Laban Dance Centre, which was designed by Swiss architects Jacques Herzog and Pierre de Meuron, and opened in February 2003; and the Art in Perpetuity Trust (APT) gallery and studio space. In 2002 the Creekside Discovery Centre was established to retain some urban habitat that was being destroyed through the area's regeneration. A record label, Deptford Fun City Records was set up by Miles Copeland III, brother of Stewart Copeland, in the late 1970s as an outlet for Deptford bands such as Alternative TV and Squeeze.

The area has several pubs, including the Dog & Bell which has a reputation for serving a range of cask ales, The Royal Albert which is a Grade II listed building from the mid-19th century that was previously known as The Paradise Bar and saw early gigs by Bloc Party and Art Brut, and The Bird's Nest which has live music, film and art performances from local bands and artists. The town hall of the former Metropolitan Borough of Deptford, built in 1905 with decorative sculpture by Henry Poole, lies just outside Deptford, on the New Cross Road in New Cross. It was purchased by Goldsmiths College in 2000.

There are several green spaces in the area, the largest being Brookmill Park, Deptford Park, Ferranti Park, Pepys Park and Sayes Court Park. In 1884 William John Evelyn, a descendant of John Evelyn, sold ground then being used as market gardens in Deptford, to the London County Council for less than its market value, as well as paying toward the cost of its purchase. It was officially opened to the public as Deptford Park on 7 June 1897. In 1886, he dedicated an acre and a half of the Sayes Court recreation ground in perpetuity to the public and a permanent provision was made for the Evelyn estate to cover the expense of maintenance and caretaking, this was opened on 20 July 1886.

== Transport ==
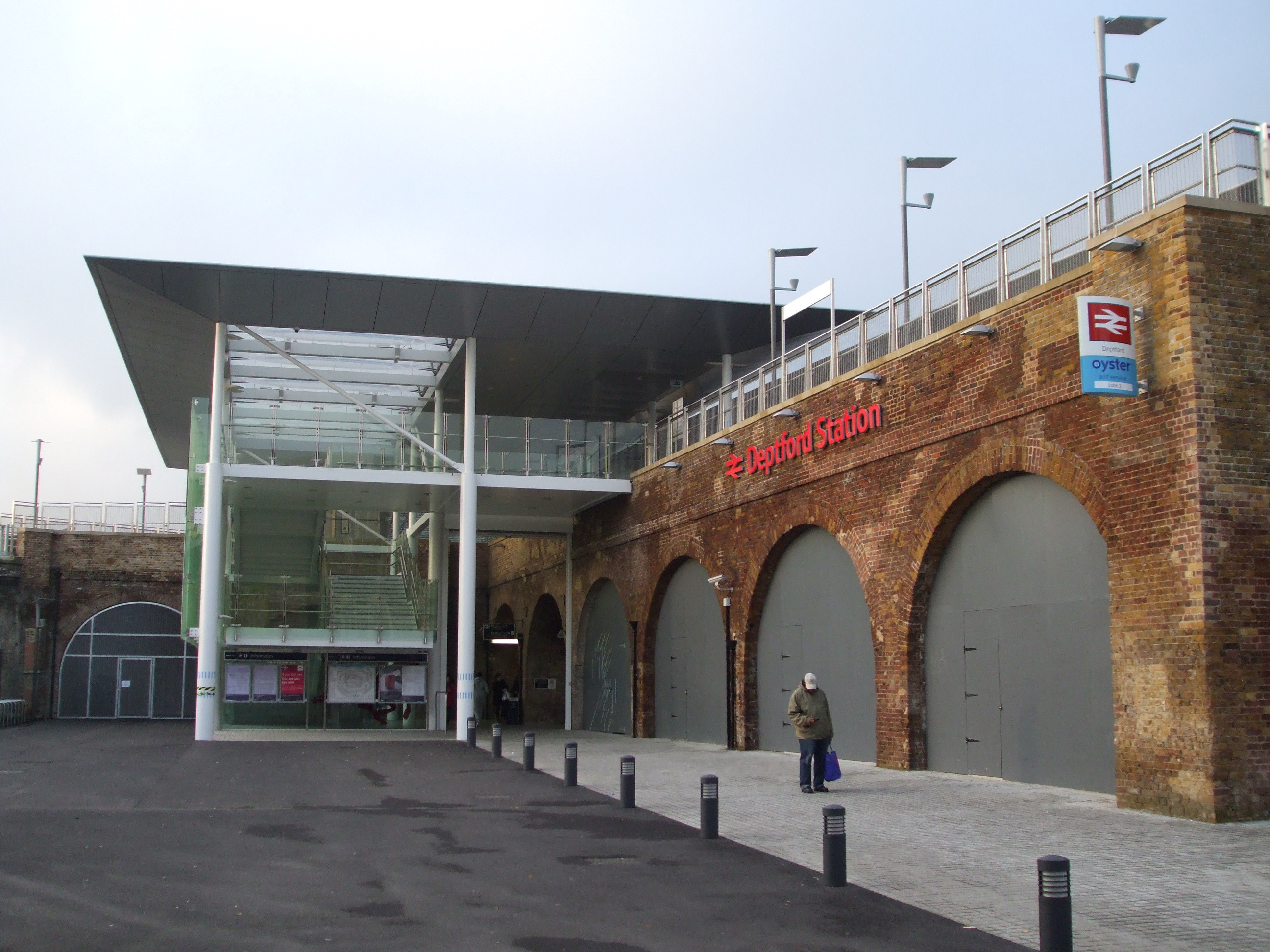
The refurbished Deptford Station

Deptford is served by National Rail and Docklands Light Railway services. The National Rail service is operated by Southeastern and Thameslink on the suburban Greenwich Line at Deptford railway station, the oldest passenger-only railway station in London. Deptford station was redeveloped during 2011 and 2012. The works included the demolition of the original 1836 station building and its replacement by a new station to the west in the former station yard. Deptford's DLR station is at Deptford Bridge on the DLR's Lewisham branch.

There are two main road routes through Deptford: the A200 which runs along Evelyn Street and Creek Road, and the A2 which runs along New Cross Road, and is the modern version of the Celtic trackway which was later paved by the Romans and developed into the medieval Watling Street. The A20 marks the southern boundary of the area, along Lewisham Way and Loampit Vale.

Since June 2016, Deptford has been on the cycling route of the London Cycleway route C10 that starts in Greenwich and ends in Euston in central London. A second Cycleway route, C14, between Waterloo and Thamesmead, passes through Deptford's riverfront. A third Cycleway route, C4, was opened in September 2022 and runs along Evelyn Street (A200) and provides protected cycle links to Tower Bridge and Woolwich.

Since 2024, Lewisham Council has been trialling a timed pedestrianisation of part of Deptford High Street on market days. In April 2025, the council announced plans to make the section between New Cross Road and Hamilton Street pedestrian-only seven days a week. The proposed scheme included new planting, public realm improvements and support for outdoor trading, with exemptions for residents, businesses, Blue Badge holders and essential service vehicles. The proposals were intended to improve air quality, safety and accessibility while encouraging footfall and local spending. However, the plans were shelved around September 2025 following opposition from residents and local traders.

== Education ==
There are five primary schools in the area. There are no local secondary schools directly in Deptford, however there are two secondary schools near the border between New Cross and Deptford: Deptford Green, regarded by Ofsted as "needing improvement", and Addey and Stanhope, regarded by Ofsted as "good". A branch of the further education college, Lewisham College incorporating Southwark College (known as LeSoCo), is located on Deptford Church Street; the college was regarded as "inadequate" in the 2014 Ofsted inspection.

== Landmarks ==
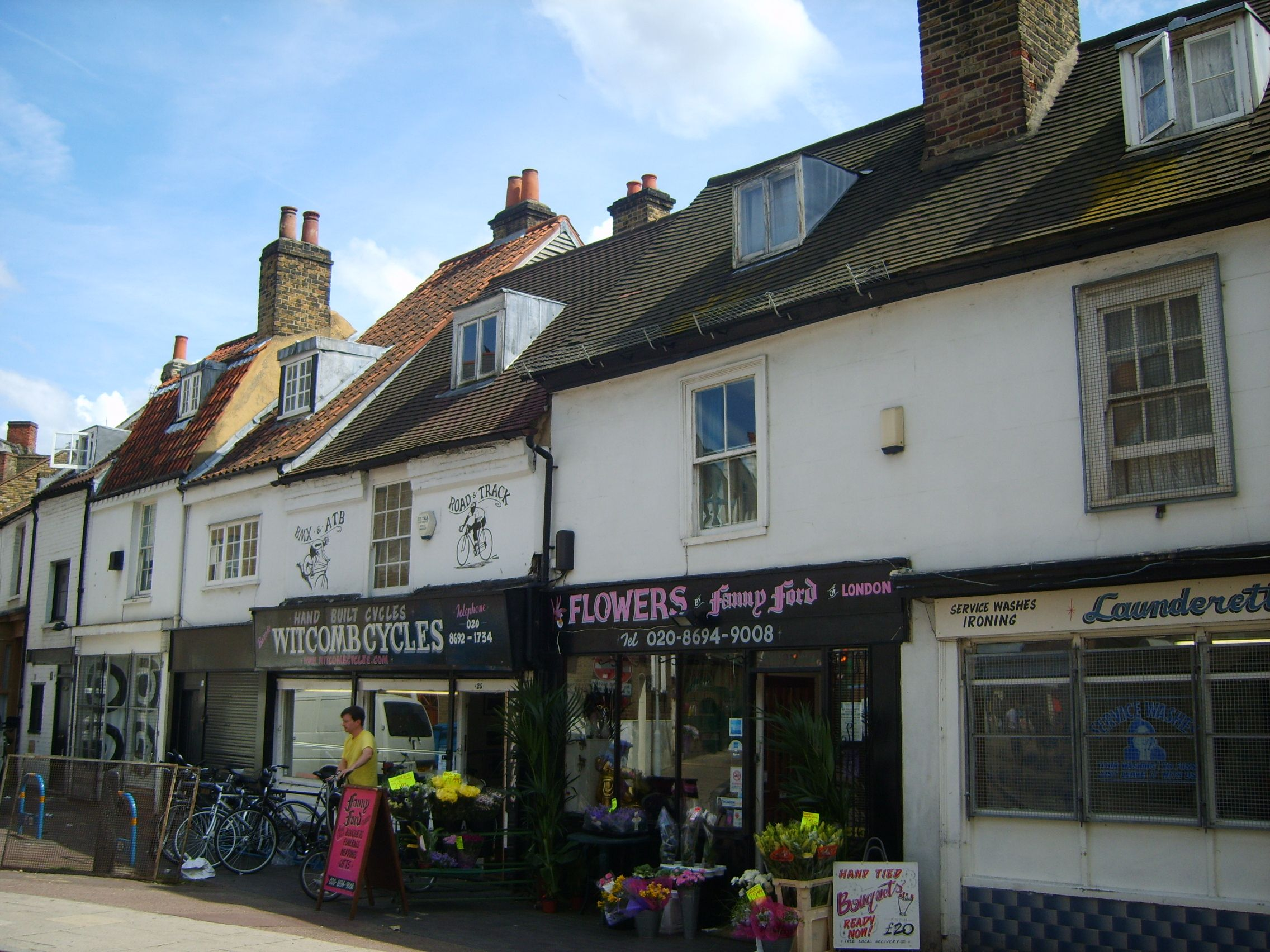
Grade II listed 18th-century buildings on Tanners Hill

Deptford railway station is one of the oldest suburban stations in the world, being built (c.1836-38) as part of the first suburban service (the London and Greenwich Railway), between London Bridge and Greenwich. Close to Deptford Creek is a Deptford pumping station, a Victorian pumping station built in 1864, part of the massive London sewerage system designed by civil engineer Sir Joseph Bazalgette.

The former Deptford Power Station, in use from 1891 to 1983, originated as a pioneering plant designed by Sebastian de Ferranti, which when built was the largest station in the world.

In 2008, Lewisham Council granted permission for the last remnants of the Deptford Ragged School known as The Princess Louise Institute to be demolished and replaced by flats.

Albury Street (previously Union Street) contains a fine row of early urban houses largely dating from 1705 to 1717 which were once popular with naval captains and shipwrights.

Tanners Hill in the St John's or New Deptford area to the south of New Cross Road, is part of an Area of Archaeological Priority due to the longevity of settlement and early industry, and contains a set of commercial buildings from numbers 21 to 31 which are survivors from a row of 31 which were built in the 1750s on the site of cottages dating from the 17th century.

These timber-frame buildings have a Grade II listing from English Heritage and are home to established businesses such as bicycle maker Witcomb Cycles. Of Deptford's two important houses, Sayes Court no longer exists, but the Stone House in St Johns, built around 1772 by the architect George Gibson the Younger, and described by Pevsner as "the one individual house of interest in this area", still stands by Lewisham Way.

Deptford's Albany Theatre has a history stretching back over 100 years and is a prominent feature of the South-East London arts scene.

=== Churches ===
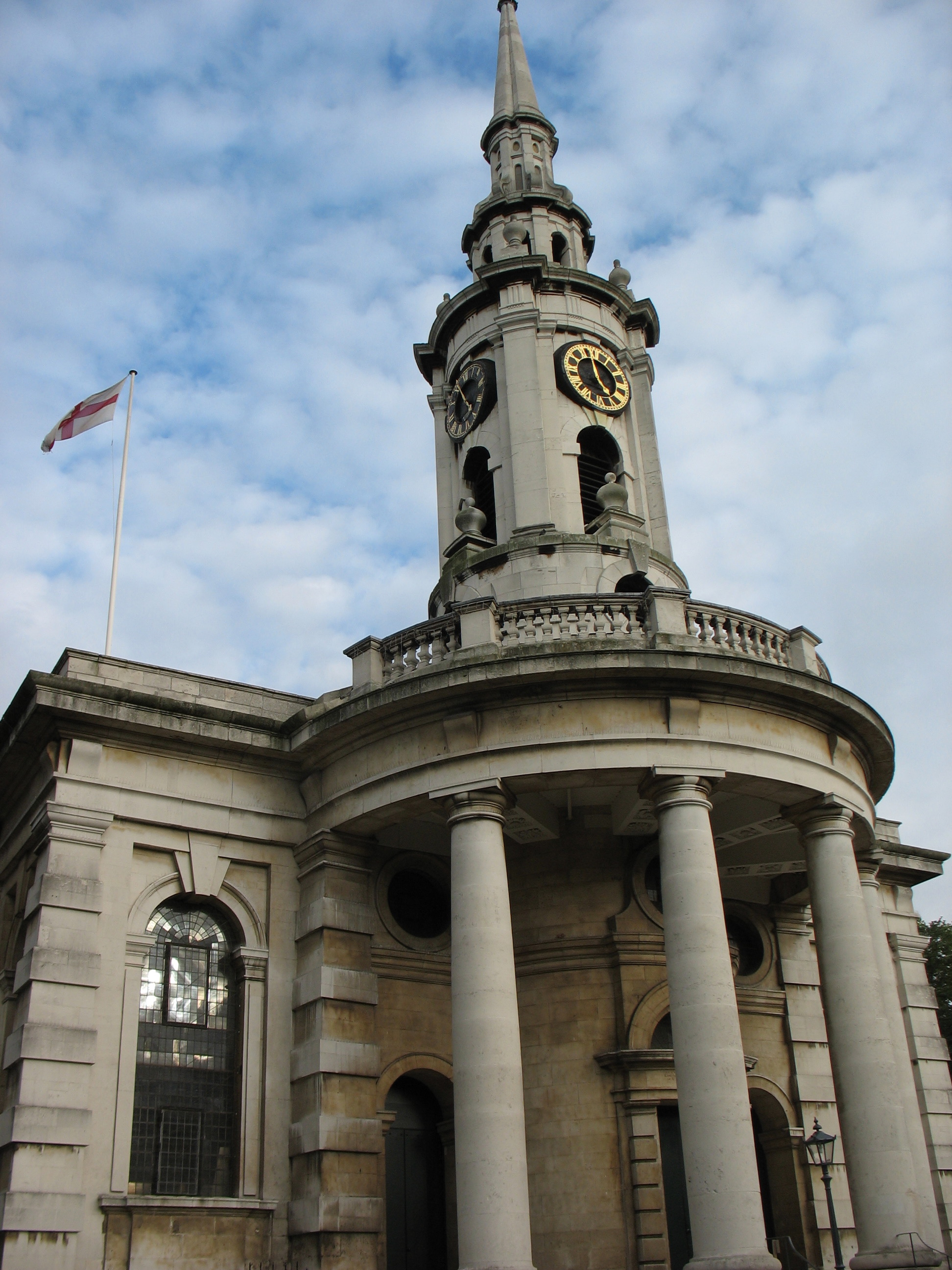
The notable Baroque frontage of St. Paul's church

- Original parish church - St Nicholas Church, Deptford
- Daughter churches:
  - St. Luke's, another historic circular church, dating from 1870
  - St. Paul's, Deptford (1712–1730) - built in the 18th century, acclaimed by the Royal Commission on the Historical Monuments of England as one of the finest Baroque churches in the country. John Betjeman is attributed as referring to the church as "a pearl at the heart of Deptford". It was designed by the architect Thomas Archer, who was a pupil of Sir Christopher Wren, as part of the Commission for Building Fifty New Churches with the intention of instilling pride in Britain, and encouraging people to stay in London rather than emigrate to the New World. Adjacent to the church yard is Albury Street, which contains some fine 18th-century houses which were popular with sea captains and shipbuilders.

=== Deptford Dockyard ===
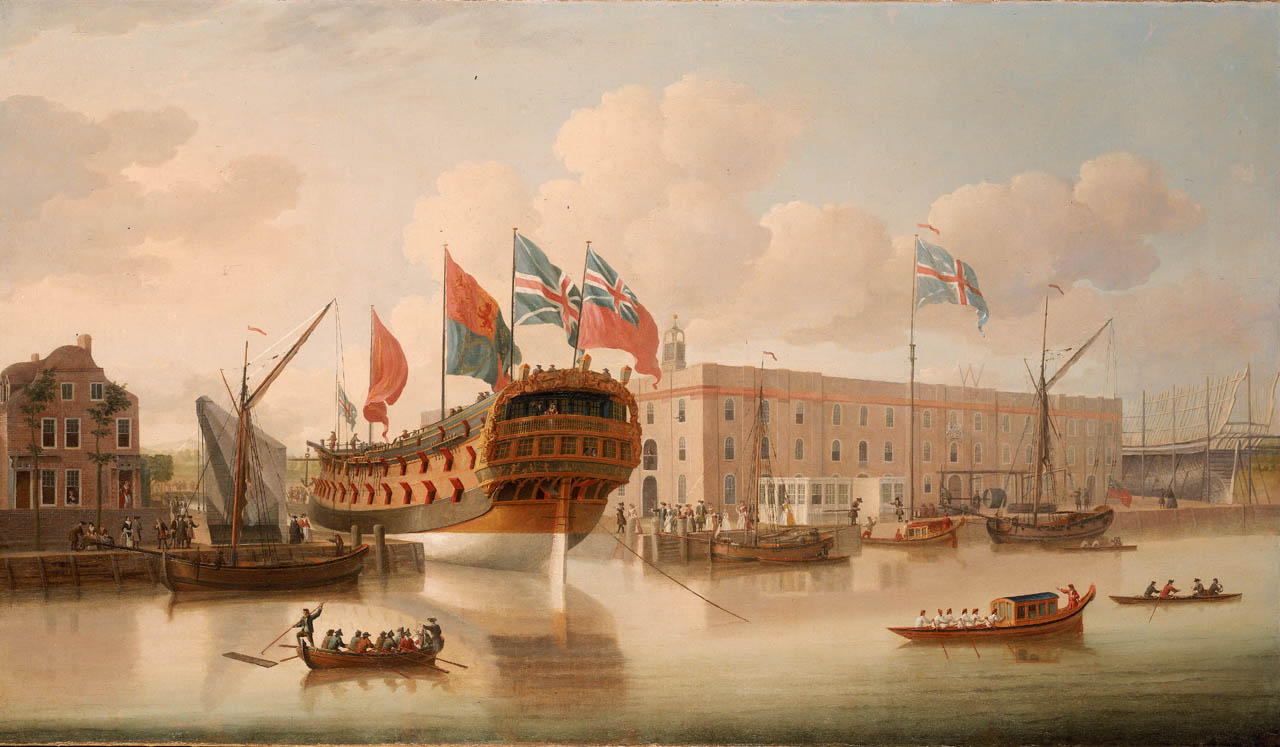
Painting of Deptford Dockyard in 1747 by John Cleveley the Elder. National Maritime Museum.

Deptford Dockyard was established in 1513 by Henry VIII as the first Royal Dockyard, building vessels for the Royal Navy, and was at one time known as the King's Yard. It was shut down from 1830 to 1844 before being closed as a dockyard in 1869, and is currently known as Convoys Wharf. From 1871 until the First World War it was the City of London Corporation's Foreign Cattle Market. In 1912, The Times reported that over 4 million head of live cattle, and sheep, had been landed.

From 1932 until 2008 the site was owned by News International, which used it to import newsprint and other paper products from Finland until early 2000. It is now owned by Hutchison Whampoa Limited and is subject to a planning application to convert it into residential units, though it has safeguarded wharf status.

Other notable shipyards in Deptford were Charles Lungley's Dockyard and the General Steam Navigation Company's yards at Deptford Green and Dudman's Dock, also sometimes referred to as Deadmans Dock at Deptford Wharf.

== Murder of Christopher Marlowe ==
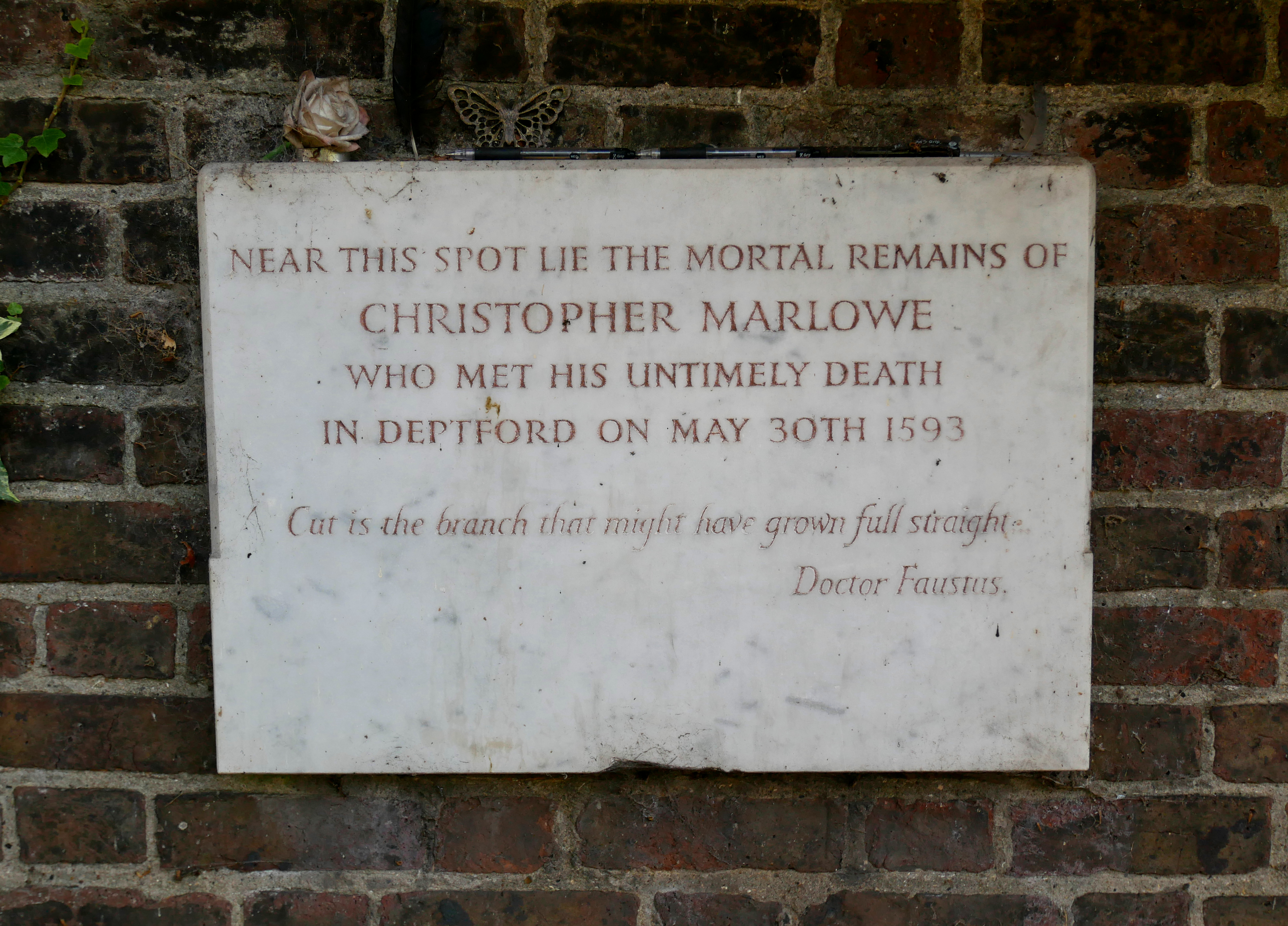
Modern memorial to Christopher Marlowe on the east wall of the graveyard of the Church of St Nicholas, Deptford. The precise location of his grave is unknown.

The Elizabethan playwright Christopher Marlowe was killed during an alleged drunken brawl in Eleanor Bull's house in Deptford Strand in May 1593. Various versions of Marlowe's death were current at the time. Francis Meres says Marlowe was "stabbed to death by a bawdy serving-man, a rival of his in his lewd love" as punishment for his "epicurism and atheism". In 1917, in the Dictionary of National Biography, Sir Sidney Lee wrote that Marlowe was killed in a drunken fight. Some modern theories posit that he was assassinated. It is commonly assumed that the fight took place in a Deptford tavern.

The scholar Leslie Hotson discovered in 1925 the coroner's report on Marlowe's death in the Public Record Office which gave fuller details. Marlowe had spent all day in a house owned by the widow Eleanor Bull, along with three men, Ingram Frizer, Nicholas Skeres and Robert Poley. Witnesses testified that Frizer and Marlowe had earlier argued over the bill, exchanging "divers malicious words." Later, while Frizer was sitting at a table between the other two and Marlowe was lying behind him on a couch, Marlowe snatched Frizer's dagger and began attacking him. In the ensuing struggle, according to the coroner's report, Marlowe was accidentally stabbed above the right eye, killing him instantly. The jury concluded that Frizer acted in self-defence, and within a month he was pardoned. Marlowe was buried in an unmarked grave in the churchyard of St Nicholas, Deptford, on 1 June 1593.

== Notable people ==
Among people associated with Deptford are Christopher Marlowe, who was stabbed to death at Deptford Strand; diarist John Evelyn (1620–1706), who lived at Sayes Court, and had Peter the Great (1672–1725) as a guest for about three months in 1698; Sir Francis Drake, who was knighted by Queen Elizabeth I aboard the Golden Hind in Deptford Docks; and Emperor Norton (Joshua Abraham Norton), the San Francisco eccentric and self-proclaimed "Emperor of the United States", who was born in Deptford in 1818.

Other people who have lived in Deptford range from the first governor of the East India Company and ambassador to the court of Russia, Thomas Smythe, whose magnificent house was destroyed by fire in 1618; to early members of the Chartist movement, John Gast and George Julian Harney; and the Cleveleys, John Cleveley the Elder and his sons John and Robert, a family of marine artists who also worked as tradesmen in the Dockyard. Another artist born in Deptford is Henry Courtney Selous, who is known for The Opening of The Great Exhibition, painted in 1851.

Members of rock groups Squeeze and Dire Straits lived on the Crossfield Estate in Deptford in the late 1970s, along with Mark Perry, founder of the punk fanzine Sniffin Glue and punk rock band Alternative TV. The DJ and music journalist Danny Baker lived near the Crossfield Estate, where he was born and brought up. Steve Harley, frontman of the glamrock band Cockney Rebel, was born in Deptford, as was British rapper and filmmaker Rapman (Andrew Onwubolu).

Children's author Robin Jarvis wrote two trilogies of books: The Deptford Mice (and a couple of spin off books called The Deptford Mouselets series) and The Deptford Histories, set in and around Deptford and featuring many of its landmarks.
