= Deptford Cinema =

Cinema in Deptford, London, England

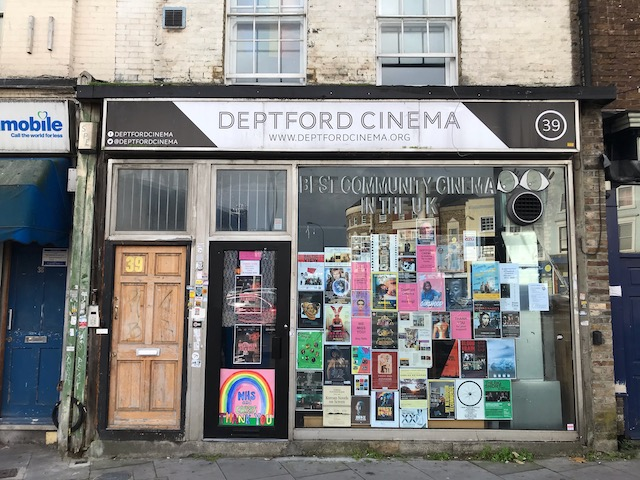
- Deptford Cinema, photographed in 2020
- Interactive map of Deptford Cinema
- Address: 39 Deptford Broadway, London; SE8 4PQ; United Kingdom
- Location: Deptford, Lewisham, London
- Coordinates: 51.474487°N 0.024487°W
- Capacity: 40

Construction
- Opened: 2014
- Closed: 2020

Website
- www.deptfordcinema.org

Deptford Cinema is a volunteer run, not-for-profit, community cinema, art gallery, and occasional music venue, formerly located at 39 Deptford Broadway in the Deptford district of the London Borough of Lewisham. At the time of opening in 2014 it was the borough's only functioning cinema. It had one downstairs screening room with roughly 40 seats, a mixture of traditional velvet movie theatre seating and sofas.

== History ==
The volunteer body transformed the two-floor derelict space, a former shop front that had been closed for about 15 years, into a cinema using funds donated through Kickstarter. Prior to its opening Lewisham had for a time been one of only two London boroughs with no dedicated cinema.

The volunteer body has no hierarchy, meaning anyone can get involved with any aspect of running the cinema; from programming and marketing, to construction, front of house duties etc.

Whilst struggling to pay off a large business rates bill in 2016, despite at the time being registered as a Community Interest Company, Deptford Cinema saw support from notable people such as Glenda Jackson and Sue Perkins.

As of early 2018 the cinema had run, or was planning to run, seasons of films by directors such as Claire Denis, Xavier Dolan, Terry Gilliam, Doris Wishman, Spike Lee, Powell and Pressburger, Akira Kurosawa, Pedro Almodóvar, Andrzej Zulawski, Agnès Varda, Andrei Tarkovsky and more. The cinema also teamed up with streaming company Mubi several times for screenings to showcase films currently available through their service.

In October 2020 the collective announced due to ongoing temporary closures enforced due to the COVID-19 pandemic they had voted not to renew the lease on their current premises and would be seeking a new location.
