= Stone House, Deptford =

House in Deptford, London

Coordinates: 51.4686°N 0.025201°W

Stone House is one of the oldest and most distinctive buildings in the London Borough of Lewisham.

Stone House as seen from the entrance in Lewisham Way, Deptford.

It was built between 1771 and 1773 by George Gibson the younger, for himself.

It is Grade II* Listed. The house has columns with capitals formed of leaves and florets, which are also used on St Mary's church in Lewisham, another of George Gibson's designs.

The land on which the house stands, originally known as "halfpenny's field", was purchased by Gibson in 1766. The 6-acre (24,000 m^{2}) site was then extended in 1768 when Gibson bought additional land known as "Morrice's land".

The building has such an idiosyncratic design that in the 19th century it was commonly known as the Comical House and several maps from the time labeled it as such. On three sides are full height projecting bay windows and on the fourth is a grand column portico which leads to the grounds. Originally the grounds extended on to Lewisham Way but now a wall separates the road from the grounds. The building is built from Kentish Ragstone, a limey sandstone dating from the Cretaceous period. This stone gives the building a distinctive, rustic appearance.

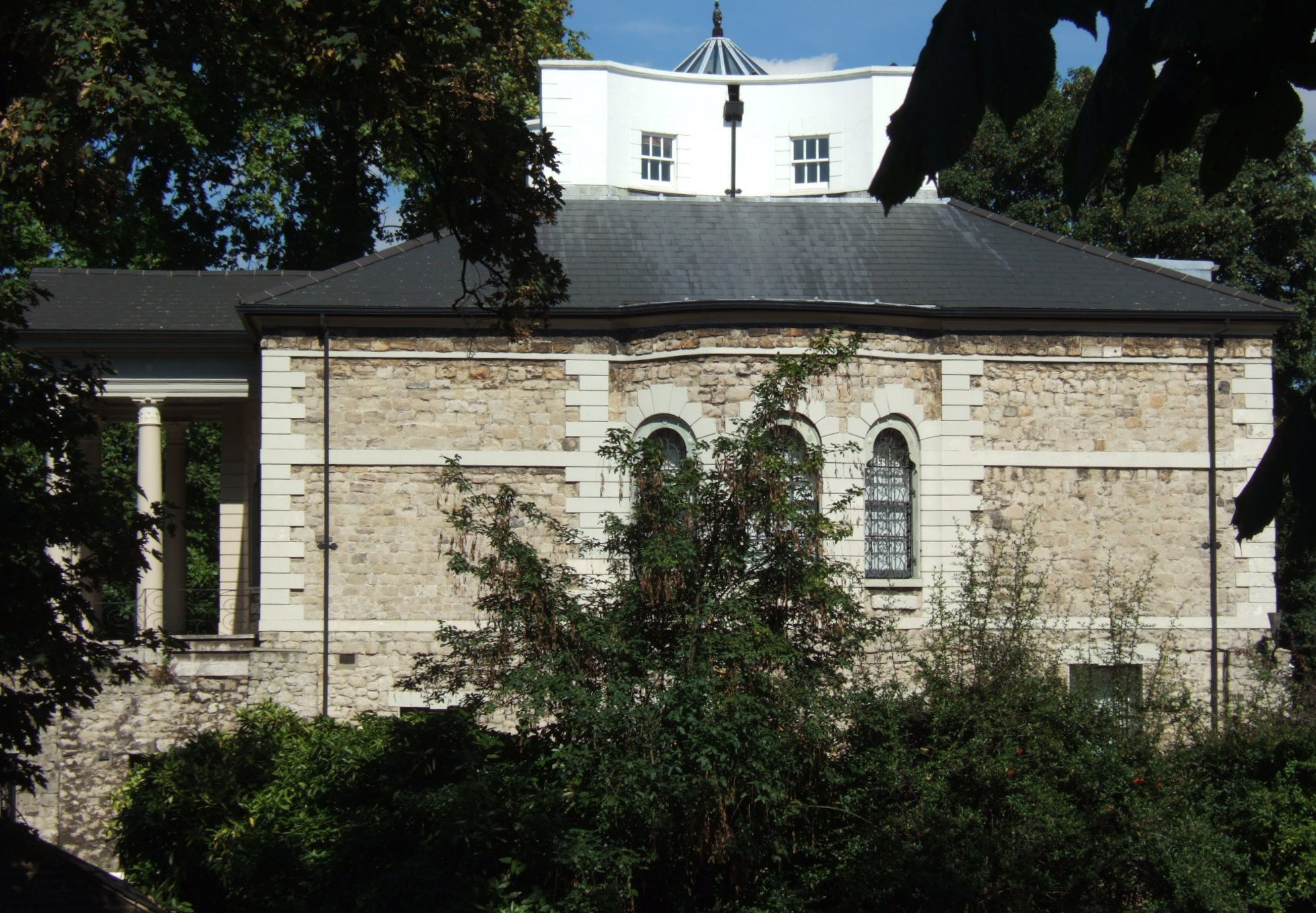
Side view of Stone House as seen from Lewisham College, Deptford. The column portico is clearly visible to the left.
