= Aragon Tower =

Residential building in London

Coordinates: 51.4907°N 0.0315°W

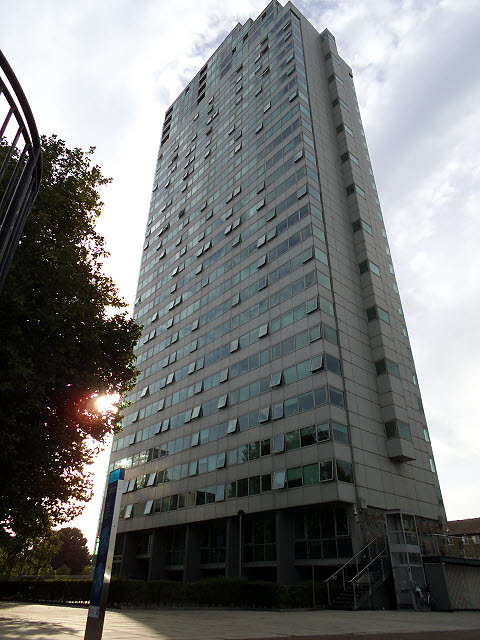
Aragon Tower

Aragon Tower on the Pepys Estate in Deptford, is one of London's tallest privately owned residential towers at 92 metres with 29 floors. It contains 158 residential apartments ranging from 2 to 3 bedrooms, with the original floors being dual aspect maisonettes of the scissor section design.

== History ==
Originally completed in 1962 (along with Eddystone Tower and Daubeny Tower on the Pepys Estate) at a height of 26 floors, Aragon Tower underwent a rebuild in 2006. Previously built and owned by the local authority, the London Borough of Lewisham, the riverside tower was sold in order to aid funding of its regeneration plans for the Pepys Estate. Completed in the summer of 2006 by Berkeley Homes (East Thames), part of the Berkeley Group Holdings plc, Aragon Tower has won numerous industry awards, and its redevelopment, along with that of the Pepys Estate that it formed part of, has served as a catalyst for the regeneration of the wider Deptford area.

Designed by Sprunt Architects as part of their masterplanning and regeneration of the Pepys Estate. Aragon Tower was built by Apex Construction who used Rolfe Judd to do the working drawings. Aragon Tower represents one of the first large-scale tower block regeneration projects within London. 14 Penthouse units were added to the top of Aragon Tower taking the building up to 29 storeys and cementing its position as one of the tallest residential towers in London at 92 metres. The three Barbican towers (Cromwell Tower, Lauderdale Tower and Shakespeare Tower) are higher at 123 metres, Ontario Tower is 155 metres, and other tall residential towers are under construction.

== Location ==
It is situated on the banks of the River Thames in north Deptford, south-east London. Access to the site is provided by the nearby Thames Clippers Riverboat service from Greenland Pier, and via the tube network from Surrey Quays and Canada Water. From the higher floors, residents can see Tower Bridge, the London Eye, Canary Wharf and the Millennium Dome.

== In media ==
It was featured in the BBC One documentary, The Tower: A Tale of Two Cities broadcast in 2007.

The Tower and the surrounding Pepys Estate feature in the video for Elf Kid's Golden Boy.

The Tower was used as Keith Lemon's residence in the early episodes of the mock reality show Lemon La Vida Loca.
