= Perronet House =

Residential tower block in London, England

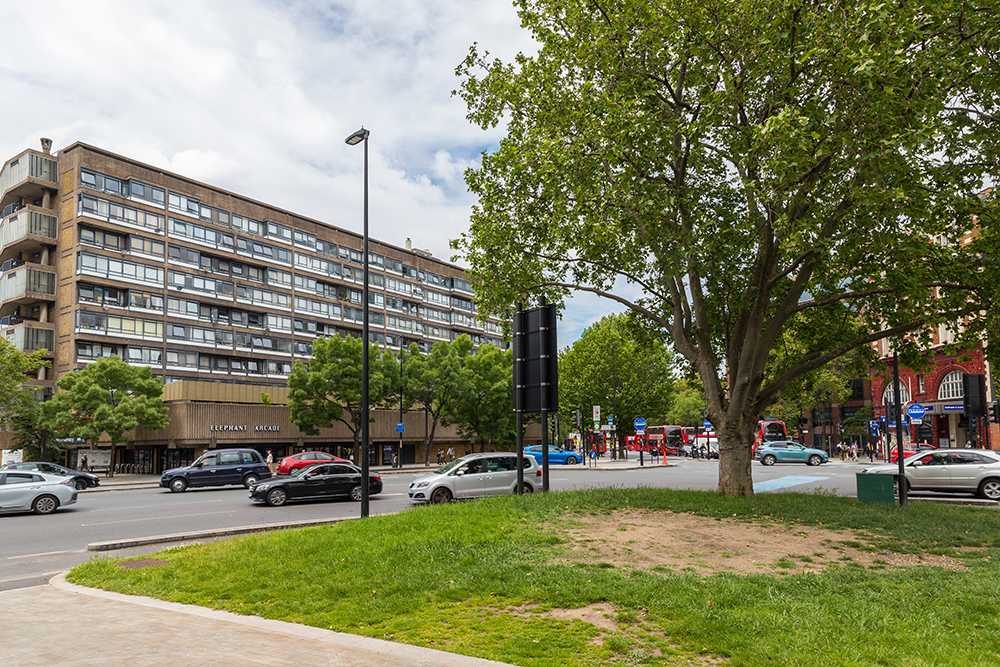
- Perronet House
- Interactive map of the Perronet House area

General information
- Architectural style: Modernist
- Location: London, UK
- Coordinates: 51.4958°N 0.1019°W
- Completed: May 1970 (initial) & 1987 (extension)
- Client: Greater London Council
- Landlord: Southwark Council

Technical details
- Structural system: in-situ concrete
- Floor count: 11

Design and construction
- Architect: Sir Roger Walters
- Main contractor: Hawkins Contractors (Southern) Ltd

Website
- www.perronethouse.com

Perronet House is an 11-storey residential council tower block adjacent to the northern roundabout of the Elephant and Castle, in London.

== Design and layout ==
In 1969 Sir Roger Walters was commissioned by the Greater London Council to design a high density block of social housing to complement the already completed high rise buildings of commercial, educational and governmental establishments in the Elephant and Castle Comprehensive Development Area on what was then known as Site 4. The building was completed in May 1970 and won a commendation in the 1971 Good Design In Housing awards.

Flats are situated on a raised "P" (for PODIUM) level, and on the 2nd, 4th, 6th, 8th and 10th floor. The P level flats are a later 1980s addition but all the flats above it are split level scissor section flats, arranged over three primary floors and wrapped around a central communal corridor. This provides each flat with a dual aspect unobstructed by external corridors more usually found on high rise social housing in the area.

In 2020, the area of the building holding garages was remodelled by the Council to create Elephant Arcade, a series of small business units destined to rehome 11 traders dislodged by the demolition of the nearby shopping centre. However, most of the arcade was closed down in 2025.

== Tenant management ==
Perronet House set itself up as a Tenant Managed Organisation (TMO) under the UK's 'Right to Manage' legislation for council houses. However it was Southwark's first TMO to fail and management of the block returned to the council in 2004. In April 2012 a new Tenants and Residents Association was formed.

== Media coverage ==
- Time Out London used images of the garden of the tenth floor communal sundeck in an article about Food Up Front, part of a feature on slow food.

See a scan of the article here

- The Guardian filmed guerrilla gardeners temporarily retreating to a Perronet House flat after an encounter with police while gardening on the Elephant and Castle north roundabout.

See the video here

- The book On Guerrilla Gardening by Richard Reynolds (Bloomsbury 2008) includes numerous photos and references to Perronet House and the building also appears illustrated on the back cover.

See more about the book here

- In December 2007 Hollywood actress Daryl Hannah made a surprise visit to Perronet House. Her arrival made the front page of the South London Press.

See a scan of the article here
