= Pepys Estate =

Residential estate in London

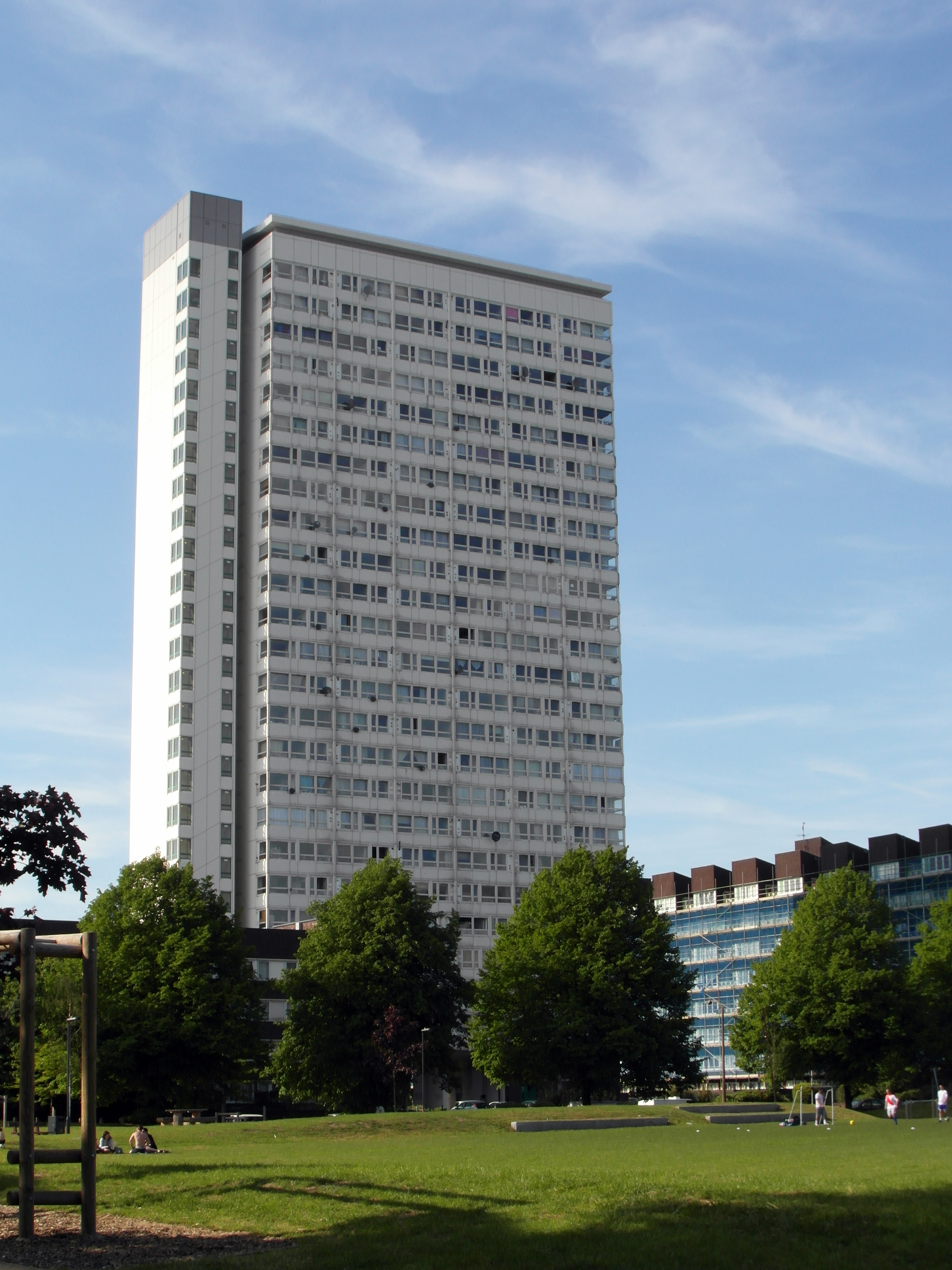
- Daubeney tower block on the Pepys Estate
- Interactive map of Pepys Estate

General information
- Coordinates: 51.4894°N 0.03562°W
- Area: Deptford
- Population: c. 5000
- No. of units: c. 1500

Construction
- Constructed: 1966-1973
- Authority: Greater London Council
- Style: Modernist incorporating existing Georgian buildings

Other information
- Governing body: Lewisham Council

The Pepys Estate is one of the largest council estates in London, England, situated on the banks of the river Thames opposite the Isle of Dogs, and within view of Canary Wharf.

== History ==
The Pepys estate is on the site of the Royal Navy's HM Victualling Yard, Deptford, used for victualling activity from the mid-17th century through to the early 1960s. The site was redeveloped by the Greater London Council, part of its conversion of the disused London Docklands, that had been bombed during World War II.
