= Roger Walters =

British architect

Sir Roger Walters
- Born: 31 March 1917; Chorleywood, Hertfordshire
- Died: 11 September 2010 (aged 93); London
- Education: Architectural Association School of Architecture, Liverpool School of Architecture
- Occupation: Architect
- Awards: Good Design in Housing Awards (1971)
- Practice: London County Council Architects Department
- Buildings: Thames Barrier, London; Covent Garden redevelopment Perronet House, London

Sir Roger Talbot Walters, CBE, FRIBA, FI Struct E, (1917-2010) was a British architect noted for his role in a number of major post-war projects in London from the Thames Barrier to the redevelopment of Covent Garden. He also worked on a number of housing developments across London, including the Palace Road Estate in Tulse Hill, and Brentford Dock and Marina. As Chief Architect of the Greater London Council he developed a more low key style, in contrast to the high rise ethic of the 1970s and pioneered the use of public consultation in architecture.
