= Royal Albert, Deptford =

Pub in Lewisham, London, England

Coordinates: 51°28′31″N 0°01′43″W

The Royal Albert
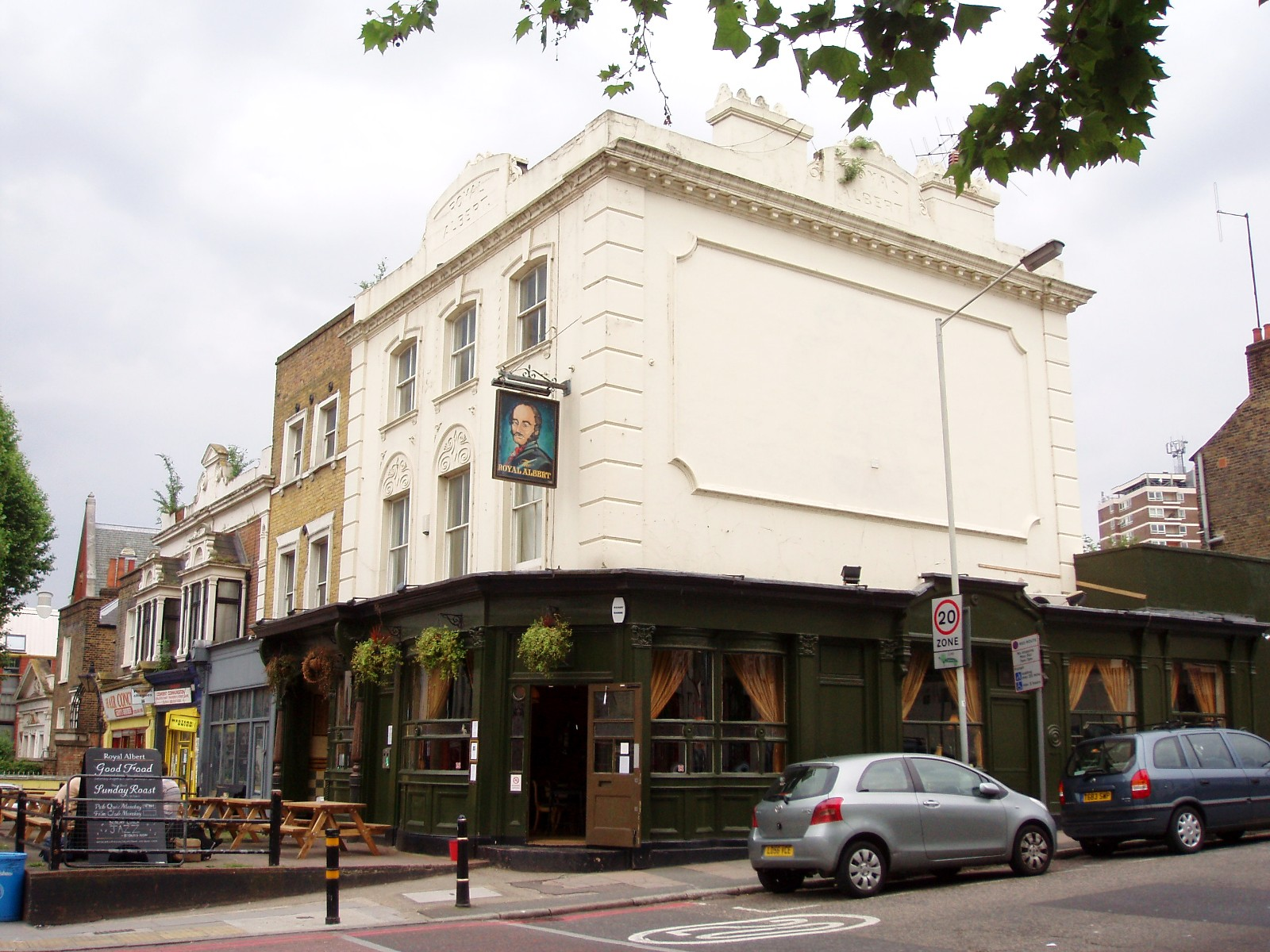

General information
- Location: 460 New Cross Road; Deptford, London, SE14

Design and construction
- Designations

Listed Building – Grade II
- Designated: 12 Mar 1973
- Reference no.: 1079967

The Royal Albert is a Grade II listed pub located at 460 New Cross Road, on the border of the New Cross and Deptford areas of the London Borough of Lewisham in south-east London.

== History ==
The building was designated as Grade II listed in 1973, the entry states it is mid-19th century. It's mentioned in an edition of The Freemasons' Magazine and Masonic Mirror from 1858.

It was called The Paradise Bar for a time in the late 20th and early 21st centuries, by 2005 it was called Six Strings, before eventually returning to its original name.

Whilst named The Paradise Bar it regularly held concerts, as well as funk and soul jam sessions that were often attended by students at nearby Goldsmiths University.

The Damron Women's Traveller '98 lists Sunday nights at the bar as Je Suis Music, a popular club night attended by lesbians and gay men.

During the 2000s it was a key venue for what the press briefly called The New Cross Scene, with bands such as Bloc Party and Art Brut playing there early in their careers. These concerts were often at an indie music night called Pop of the Tops run by Caffy St Luce.

It was run by Antic Collective in the late 2000s, but is now run by Portobello Brewing Co. It occasionally hosts jazz concerts, and has seen performers such as Nubya Garcia play there.
