= Arming (ships) =

Act of equipping a military vessel

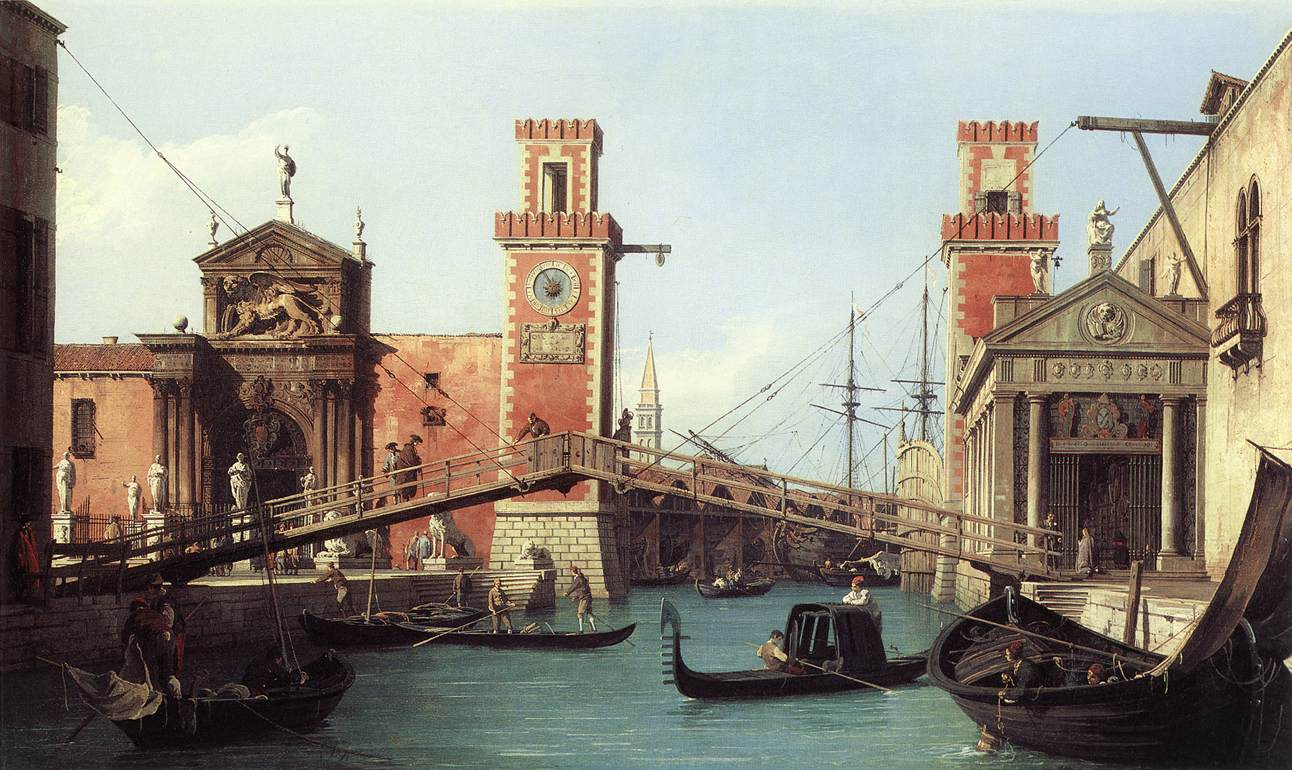
View of the entrance to the Venice Arsenal, by Canaletto, 1732

In the Age of Sail, arming or victualling a war ship or war vessel meant equipping the ship with all the necessary materials to navigate and the victuals necessary for the crew to subsist. In addition to the rigging (masts, sails and ropes), the victualler (or sutler) supplied water and provisions and, in some cases, cannons, offensive weapons and defensive weapons.

Victualling small boats without haste could be done in small facilities. On the contrary, the preparation of military fleets was usually carried out in large arsenals and shipyards.

== Arsenals and shipyards ==
In the Mediterranean there were many large centres where ships were built, armed and victualled, many of which were intended to support large military fleets. Examples include the Piraeus arsenal, the Carthage arsenal, the Tortosa shipyards, the Venice arsenal, the Barcelona shipyards, the Valencia shipyards, and the Mallorca shipyards.

In all cases, there were buildings, closed with a lock and key and with an armed guard, to store the necessary material, for example: pulleys, anchors, masts, yards, sails, auxiliary boats, rudders, oars, bombards, armor, pavises, crossbows, and pins. In the case of the Barcelona shipyards, there are many documents (inventories in particular) that list the variety of items needed to arm a ship.

== Documents ==
- 1283. Ramon Muntaner often talks about arming galleys and other ships.

E com vench l'endemà, lo senyor rey se feu venir l'almirall, e dix-li: Almirall, tantost armats XXV galees e armats-les axí que cascuna haja un còmit cathalà e altre llatí,...

— Crònica de Ramon Muntaner. Capítol LXXVI.

- 1378. Privilege of Peter the Ceremonious in the city of Barcelona to arm a galley (“la galea de l'almoina”) with voluntary donations to defend the waters of Barcelona against pirates and corsairs.
- 1406. Galley armed by Mateu Cardona.
- 1462. Roger, Count of Pallars, asks for a galley to arm it.
