= Mauger (archbishop of Rouen) =

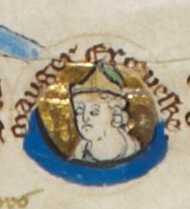

Archbishop of Rouen
- Tenure: 1037 – 1053
- Predecessor: Robert II
- Successor: Maurilius
- Born: Dieppe
- House: House of Normandy
- Father: Richard II, Duke of Normandy
- Mother: Papia of Envermeu
- Religion: Roman Catholicism

Mauger (or Malger according to the Gesta Normannorum Ducum) was the Archbishop of Rouen. He was the younger son of Richard II, Duke of Normandy, and his second wife, Papia of Envermeu.

Mauger was brought up at the abbey of Fécamp as an eminent member of the ducal family, some of whom were later openly hostile to the accession of Duke William II. On the death of his uncle Robert, Archbishop of Rouen in 1037, Mauger, who was only 18 was chosen to succeed him.

Mauger was apparently slow to instill loyalty to the young Duke William. In particular, he was opposed to the marriage of Duke William and Matilda of Flanders in 1049. His full brother William of Talou married a sister of the Count of Ponthieu and was appointed by William as Count of Arques, near Dieppe.

William of Talou, Mauger's brother, was defeated in a failed rebellion against their nephew Duke William in battle near Arques in 1053, after which the former fled into exile at Boulogne. Because of a perceived connection to his brother's rebellion, Mauger was deposed from his archbishopric at the council of Lisieux. Mauger was banished from Rouen to the Isle of Guernsey; he landed at a bay on the south coast that was named "Saint's Bay" in his honour.

Mauger's behaviour as a secular lord who had opposed papal authority enabled William to achieve his deposition on the grounds of inappropriate conduct at a provincial council held at Lisieux in 1054 or 1055, under the bishop Hugh of Lisieux (fl. 1049 - d. 17 July 1077). Stories relating to the end of Mauger's life in the Channel Islands were collected a century later by Wace (1100-1174), himself a native of Jersey. According to Wace, Mauger had a common law wife, who had borne him many children, and Mauger had devoted himself to hawking and reading occult sciences. The dethroned bishop is alleged to have abandoned himself to a pact with the devil and, having gone mad, drowned; his body was buried in a church at Cherbourg-Octeville. He was succeeded by Maurilius.

== Sources ==
- Allen, Richard (2009). The Norman Episcopate 988 - 1100 (2 Vols) (PDF). University of Glasgow.
- Crouch, David (2002). The Normans: The History of a Dynasty. Hambledon Continuum.
- de Boüard, Michel. Guillaume le Conquérant.. Paris: Fayard, 1984.
- Douglas, David C. William the Conqueror. University of California Press, Berkeley and Los Angeles, 1964.
- Gesta Normannorum Ducum of William of Jumièges, Orderic Vitalis, and Robert of Torigni, edited and translated by Elisabeth M. C. Van Houts, Clarendon Press, Oxford, 1995.
- Neveux, François. La Normandie des ducs aux rois, Xe-XIIe s. Rennes: Ouest-France, 1998.

House of Normandy Family tree

Count of Rouen, 911
Rollo d. between 928 and 933; 1st Norman count of Rouen r. 911–927; House of Normandy
William "Longsword" c. 893–942; 2nd Norman count of Rouen r. 927–942
Duke of Normandy, 942
Richard I "the Fearless"; 932–996; 1st Duke of Normandy r. 942–996
Richard II "the Good" d. 1026; 2nd Duke of Normandy r. 996–1027	Robert; Count of Évreux, Archbishop of Rouen	Mauger c. 988–1032 m. Germain, Countess of Corbeil	Geoffrey d. c. 1010; Count of Eu	William I 978–after 1057; Count of Eu and Hiémois
House of Clare
Richard III; 997/1001–1027; 3rd Duke of Normandy r. 1026–1027	Robert I "the Magnificent"; 1000–1035; 4th Duke of Normandy r. 1027–1035	Richard c. 1015–1067; Count of Évreux	Ralph de Gacé d. 1051; Lord of Gacé
Illegitimate
Nicolas of Normandy c. 1027–1092; Abbot of Saint Ouen	William II (of Normandy) "the Conqueror" c. 1028–1087; 5th Duke of Normandy r. 1035–1087, King of England as "William I" r. 1066–1087	William c. 1015–1067; Count of Évreux
Robert II "Curthose" c. 1051–1134; 6th Duke of Normandy r. 1087–1106	Richard c. 1054–1070	Adela c. 1067–1137 m. Stephen II, Count of Blois	William II (of England) "Rufus" c. 1057–1100; King of England r. 1087–1100; Ducal Regent r. 1096–1100	Henry I "Beauclerc" c. 1068–1135; King of England r. 1100–1135, 7th Duke of Normandy r. 1106–1135
Illegitimate→
William Clito; 1102–1128; Count of Flanders; Ducal claimant	Stephen; 1092/1096–1154; King of England r. 1135–1154, 8th Duke of Normandy r. 1135–1144	Henry V 1081/1086–1125; King of Germany, Holy Roman Emperor	Matilda I c. 1102–1167; Lady of the English "Empress Matilda"	Geoffrey Plantagenet; 1113–1151; Count of Anjou, 9th Duke of Normandy r. 1144–1150	William III Adelin; 1103–1120; Duke of Normandy 1120 in his father's lifetime	Robert I c. 1090–1147; 1st Earl of Gloucester	Richard of Lincoln before 1101–1120	Reginald c. 1100–1175; 1st Earl of Cornwall	Robert FitzEdith; 1093–1172 m. Matilda d'Avranches, Baroness of Okehampton	Gilbert FitzRoy	Henry FitzRoy c. 1100/1104–1158	Fulk FitzRoy c. 1092–1132; Monk at Abingdon?
House of Blois	House of Salians	House of Plantagenet
Illegitimate→
Henry II "Curtmantle"; 1133–1189; 10th Duke of Normandy r. 1150–1189; King of England r. 1154–1189	William FitzRobert; 1116–1183; 2nd Earl of Gloucester	Roger of Worcester c. 1134–1179; Bishop of Worcester	Richard d. 1142; Bishop of Bayeux	Meiler Fitzhenry d. 1220; Lord Chief Justice of Ireland
Henry "the Young King"; 1155–1183; Duke of Normandy r. 1170–1183 in his father's lifetime	Richard IV "Lionheart"; 1157–1199; 11th Duke of Normandy, King of England as "Richard I" r. 1189–1199	John "Lackland"; 1166–1216; 12th Duke of Normandy, King of England r. 1199–1216
Henry III; 1207–1272; 13th Duke of Normandy r. 1216–1259; King of England r. 1216–1272
Duchy of Normandy renounced at Treaty of Paris, 1259
