= Rollo =

Viking, Count of Rouen from 911 to 928

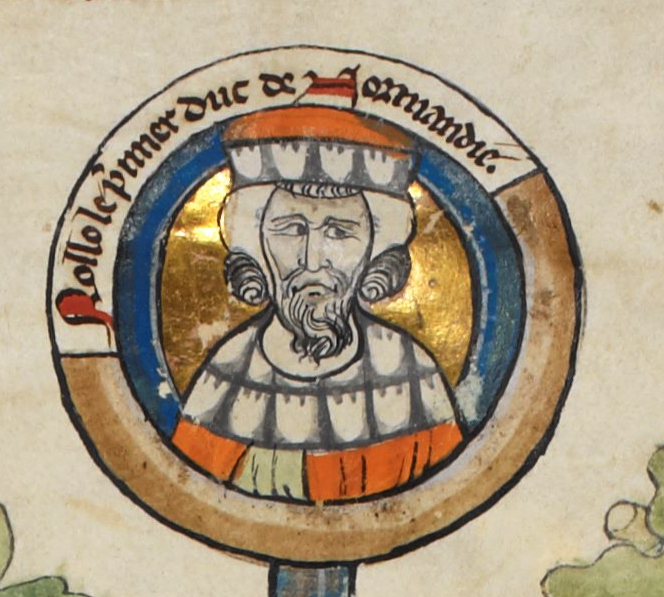
- Rollo as depicted in the 13th century

Count of Rouen
- Reign: 911–928
- Successor: William Longsword
- Born: c. 835/870; Scandinavia
- Died: 933; Duchy of Normandy
- Burial: Rouen Cathedral
- Spouses: Poppa of Bayeux; Gisela of France (possibly)
- Issue more: William Longsword; Gerloc
- House: Normandy (founder)
- Religion: Norse paganism; Later Catholic Christianity

Rollo (Norman: Rou, Rolloun; Old Norse: Hrólfr; French: Rollon; c. 835/870 – 933) was a Viking who, as Count of Rouen, became the first ruler of Normandy, a region in today's northern France. He emerged as a war leader among the Norsemen who had secured a permanent foothold on Frankish soil in the valley of the lower Seine. He was a prominent figure among the Vikings who besieged Paris in 885 and led the ill-fated Siege of Chartres in 911. The latter was nonetheless the catalyst for the consequential Treaty of Saint-Clair-sur-Epte, which saw Charles the Simple, king of West Francia, grant Rollo lands between the river Epte and the sea in exchange for Rollo agreeing to end his brigandage, swear allegiance to Charles, convert to Christianity, and pledge to defend the Seine estuary from other Viking raiders.

Rollo's life was recorded by Dudo of St. Quentin. Historians such as W. Vogel, Alexander Bugge, and Henri Prentout have debated whether Dudo's account is historically accurate, and Rollo's origin and life are heavily disputed. Rollo is usually identified with Hrólfr "the Walker" in Norwegian and Icelandic historiography.

Rollo is first recorded in a charter of 918 as the leader of a group of Viking settlers, and he reigned over the region of Normandy until at least 928. He was succeeded as ruler of the new Duchy of Normandy by his son William Longsword. The offspring of Rollo and his followers, through their intermingling with the local Frankish and Gallo-Roman population, became known as the "Normans". After the Norman conquest of England and of southern Italy and Sicily over the following two centuries, their descendants came to rule England, much of Ireland, Sicily and Antioch from the 11th to 13th centuries, leaving behind an enduring legacy in the histories of Europe and the Near East.

== Name ==
The Heimskringla (written in the 13th century) records that Rolf the Ganger went to Normandy and ruled it, so Rollo is generally presumed to be a Latinisation of the Old Norse name Hrólfr, a theory that is supported by the rendition of Hrólfr as Roluo in the Gesta Danorum by Saxo Grammaticus. It is also sometimes suggested that Rollo may be a Latinised version of another Norse name, Hrollaugr.

The 10th-century French historian Dudo in his Historia Normannorum records that Rollo took the baptismal name Robert. A variant spelling, Rou, is used in the 12th-century Norman French verse chronicle Roman de Rou, which was compiled by Wace and commissioned by King Henry II of England, a descendant of Rollo.

== Origins and historiography ==
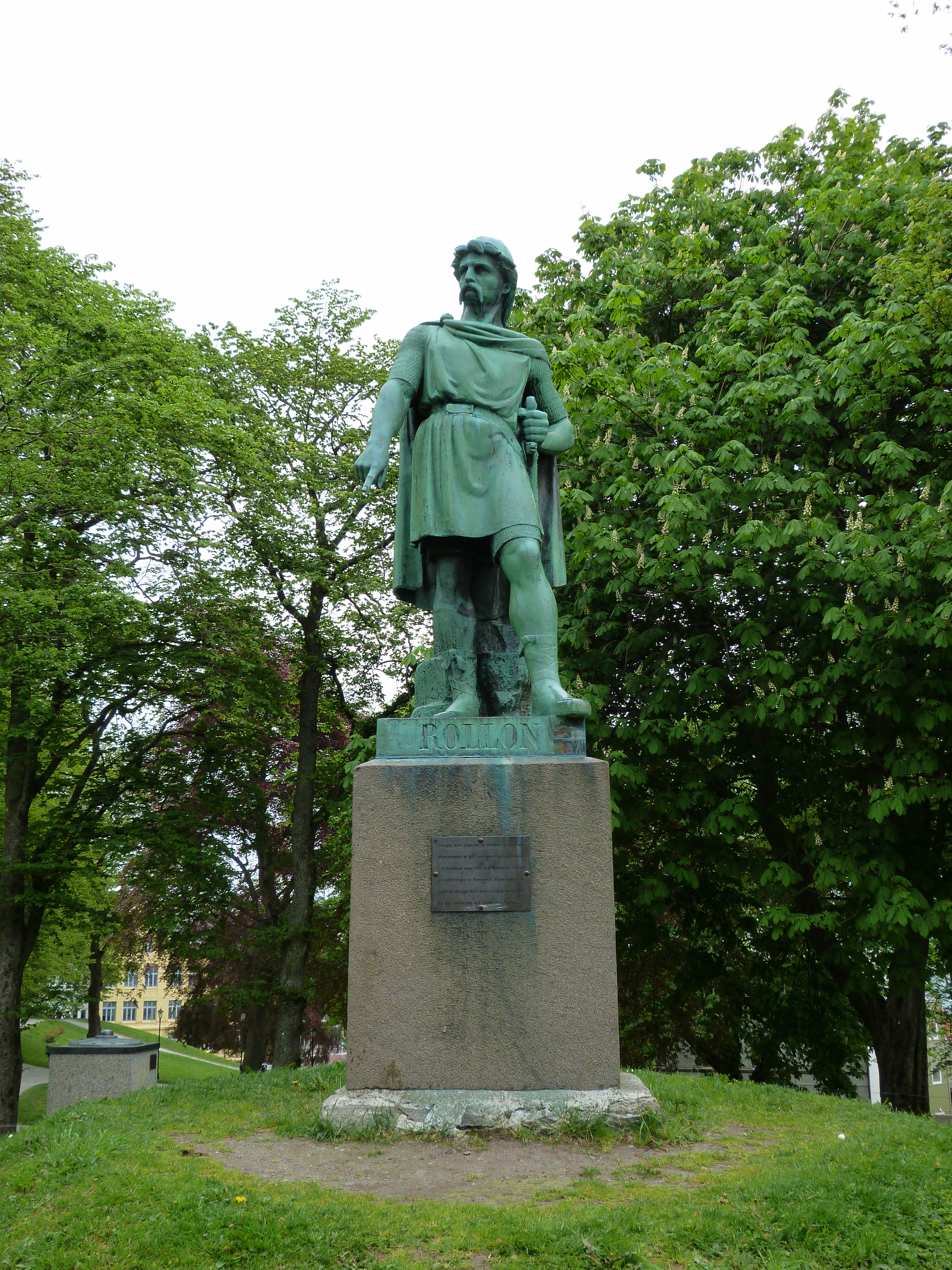
A statue of Rollo in Ålesund, Norway

In medieval Norwegian and Icelandic historiography, Rollo, the Viking leader who established himself in Normandy, was identified with Hrólfr "the Walker" Rǫgnvaldsson, the son of the jarl of Møre in western Norway. The earliest written testimony appears in the Latin Historia Norvegiæ, composed in Norway. In his royal sagas, Snorri relates that Hrólfr conquered Normandy after raiding through the Hebrides, the Irish Sea region, and Francia, and that many Norwegians settled there with him.

In the late nineteenth century, a vigorous debate emerged over Rollo's identity, partly along national lines, with Danish and Norwegian historians often taking opposing positions. Alongside the question of who Rollo was, historians disputed the meaning of terms such as "Norwegians" and "Danes" in medieval sources and the extent to which the Norman settlement should be regarded as Norwegian or Danish.

The debate was initiated by the Danish historian Johannes Steenstrup, whose central argument rested on the explicit claims of the French chronicler Dudo of Saint-Quentin that Rollo was Danish. While British, French, and Norwegian scholars have generally accepted the Norwegian-Icelandic tradition, Danish, Swedish, and German historians have tended to follow Dudo. The question cannot be settled conclusively, but among Norwegian, French, and British historians it is now common to hold that, on balance and given the surviving evidence, the case for a Norwegian origin remains the stronger.

The point on which the evidence is comparatively unambiguous, however, is that Rollo was almost certainly born in Scandinavia—either in Norway or Denmark—in the mid-9th century, as his tomb states he was in his eighties when he died in 933.

Among biographical remarks about Rollo written by the cleric Dudo of Saint-Quentin in the late 10th century, he claimed that Rollo "the Dane" was from Dacia, and had moved from there to the island of Scandza. Dacia originally referred to the region near the Black Sea, but Dudo identified it with Denmark by making a false etymology between Daci (Dacians) and Dani (Danes). One of Rollo's great-grandsons and a contemporary of Dudo was known as Robert the Dane. However, Dudo's Historia Normannorum (or Libri III de moribus et actis primorum Normanniae ducum) was commissioned by Rollo's grandson, Richard I of Normandy and while Dudo likely had access to family members and/or other people with a living memory of Rollo, this fact must be weighed against the text's potential biases, as an official biography.

According to Dudo, an unnamed king of Denmark was antagonistic to Rollo's family, including his father – an unnamed Danish nobleman – and Rollo's brother Gurim. Following the death of their father, Gurim was killed and Rollo was forced to leave Denmark. Dudo appears to have been the main source for William of Jumièges (after 1066) and Orderic Vitalis (early 12th century), although both include additional details.

A Norwegian background for Rollo was first explicitly claimed by Goffredo Malaterra (Geoffrey Malaterra), an 11th-century Benedictine monk and historian, who wrote: "Rollo sailed boldly from Norway with his fleet to the Christian coast." Likewise, the 12th-century English historian William of Malmesbury stated that Rollo was "born of noble lineage among the Norwegians".

A chronicler named Benoît (probably Benoît de Sainte-More) wrote in the mid-12th-century Chronique des ducs de Normandie that Rollo had been born in a town named "Fasge". This has since been variously interpreted as referring to Faxe in Sjælland (Denmark), Fauske in Sykkylven (Norway), or perhaps a more obscure settlement that has since been abandoned or renamed. Benoît also repeated the claim that Rollo had been persecuted by a local ruler and had fled from there to "Scanza island", by which Benoît probably means Scania (Swedish Skåne). Benoît says elsewhere in the Chronique that Rollo is Danish.

Snorri Sturluson identified Rollo with Hrólfr the Walker (Old Norse Gǫngu-Hrólfr; Norwegian Gange-Rolv or Gongu-Rolv) from the 13th-century Icelandic sagas, Heimskringla and Orkneyinga Saga. Hrólf the Walker was so named because he "was so big that no horse could carry him". The Icelandic sources claim that Rollo was from Møre in western Norway, in the late 9th century and that his parents were the Norwegian jarl Rognvald Eysteinsson ('Rognvald the Wise') and a noblewoman from Møre named Hildr Hrólfsdóttir.

There may be circumstantial evidence for kinship between Rollo and his historical contemporary Ketill Flatnose, King of the Isles – a Norse realm centred on the Western Isles of Scotland. Both Irish and Icelandic sources suggest that Rollo, as a young man, visited or lived in northern Scotland, where he had a daughter named Cadlinar (Kaðlín Kathleen). Icelandic sources name Ketill Flatnose's father as Björn Grímsson, which would imply that the name of Ketill Flatnose's paternal grandfather was Grim. That would be limited, onomastic evidence for a connection to Rollo, whose father (according to Richer) was named Ketill, while Rollo also (according to Dudo) had a brother named Gurim – a name likely cognate with Grim. In addition, Icelandic sources report that Rollo's ancestral home was Møre, where Ketill Flatnose's ancestors were also said to have originated. However, there are no surviving sources explicitly claiming a connection; Ketill was a common name in Norse societies, as were names like Gurim/Grim.

== Biography ==
Dudo's chronicle about Rollo seizing Rouen in 876 is supported by the contemporary chronicler Flodoard, who records that Robert of the Breton March waged a campaign against the Vikings, nearly levelling Rouen and other settlements. Eventually, he conceded "certain coastal provinces" to them. Although, scholars have debated this and have said that Rollo did not even arrive in West Francia until after the year 876, making this timeline given by Dudo wrong.

According to Dudo, Rollo struck up a friendship in England with a king called “Alstem”. This has puzzled many historians, but recently this person has been identified as Guthrum, the Danish leader whom Alfred the Great baptised with the name “Athelstan”, and was recognised as King of the East Angles in 880.

The earliest well-attested historical event associated with Rollo is when he was a prominent leader of the Vikings who besieged Paris in 885–886 but were fended off by Odo of France.

Dudo recorded that when Rollo controlled Bayeux by force, he carried off the beautiful Popa or Poppa, a daughter of Berenger, Count of Rennes. He married her, and they had a son and heir, William Longsword. Her parentage is uncertain, and may have been invented after the fact to legitimize her son's lineage, as many of the fantastic genealogical claims made by Dudo were. She may have come from any country with which the Norse had contact, as Dudo is a highly unreliable source who may have written his chronicle primarily as a didactic tool to teach courtly values.

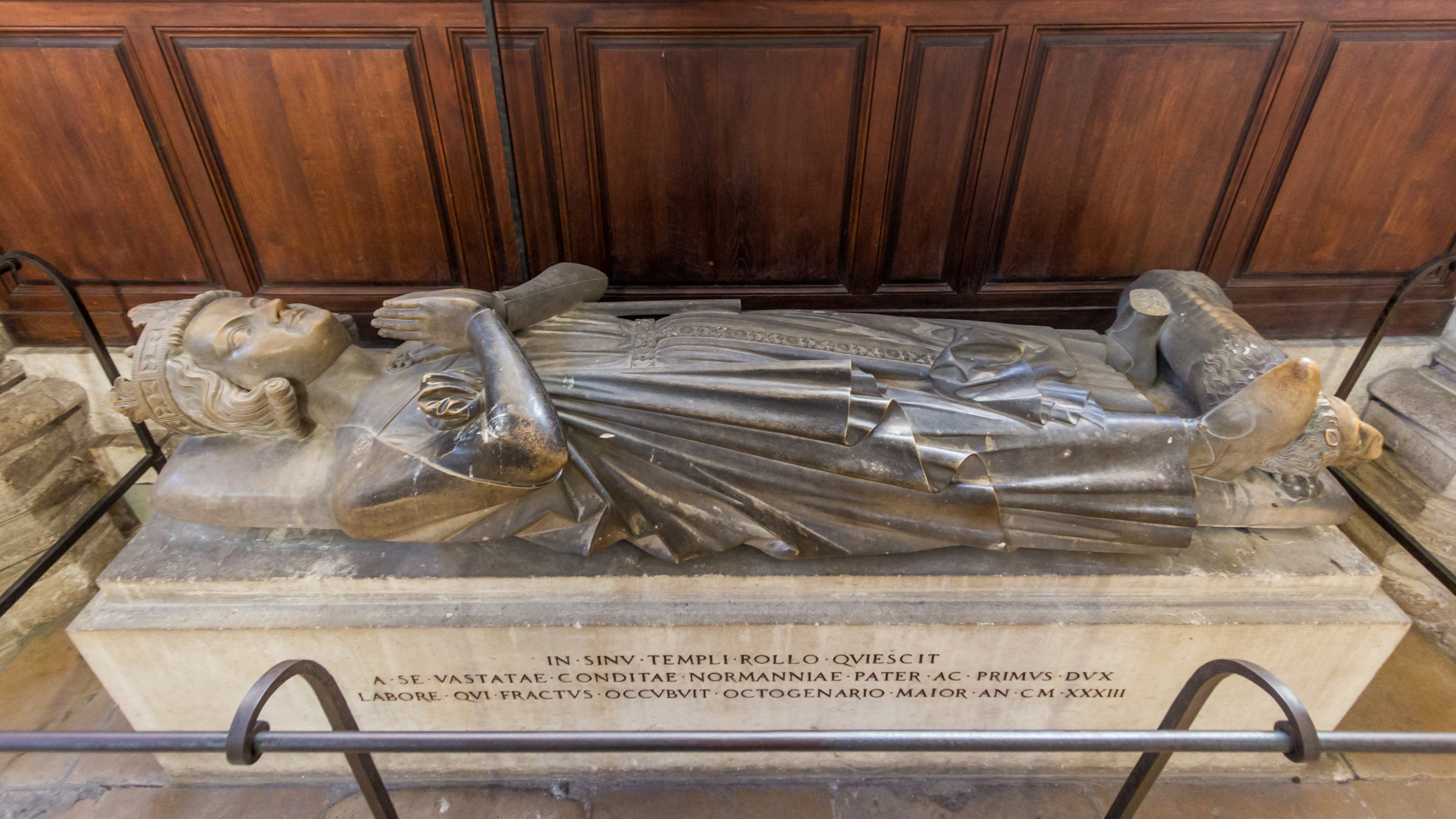
Rollo's grave at the Cathedral of Rouen

There are few contemporary mentions of Rollo. In 911, Robert I of France, brother of Odo, again defeated another band of Viking warriors in Chartres with his well-trained horsemen. This victory paved the way for Rollo's baptism and settlement in Normandy. The Treaty of Saint-Clair-sur-Epte set down that in return for formal recognition of the lands he possessed, Rollo agreed to be baptised and assisted the king in defending the realm. As was custom, Rollo took the baptismal name “Robert”, after his godfather, Robert I.

The seal of the agreement was to be a marriage between Rollo and Gisela, daughter of Charles, possibly her legitimate father. Since Charles first married in 907, that would mean that Gisela was at most 5 years old at the time of the treaty of 911 which offered her in marriage. It has therefore been speculated that she could have been an illegitimate daughter. However, a diplomatic child betrothal need not be doubted.

The earliest record of Rollo is from 918, in a charter of Charles III to an abbey, which referred to an earlier grant to "the Normans of the Seine", namely "Rollo and his associates" for "the protection of the kingdom". Dudo retrospectively stated that this pact took place in 911 at Saint-Clair-sur-Epte.

Dudo narrates a humorous story not corroborated by other primary sources about Rollo's pledge of fealty to Charles III as part of the Treaty of Saint-Clair-sur-Epte. The attendant bishops urged Rollo to kiss the king's foot to prove his allegiance. Rollo refused, saying "I will never bow my knees at the knees of any man, and no man's foot will I kiss." Instead, Rollo commanded one of his warriors to kiss the king's foot. The warrior complied by raising the king's foot to his mouth as the king was standing, which "caused the king to topple backward" much to the amusement of their entourage. On taking his oath of fealty, Rollo divided the lands between the rivers Epte and Risle among his chieftains and made Rouen his capital.

Given Rouen and its hinterland in return for the alliance with the Franks, it was agreed upon that it was in the interests of both Rollo himself and his Frankish allies to extend his authority over Viking settlers. This would appear to be the motive for later concessions to the Vikings of the Seine, which are mentioned in other records of the time. When Charles III was being deposed by Rudolph of France he appealed to Rollo and Ragenold, another one of his Norman allies. With their combined army they marched to his aid in fulfilment of their pledge to the Carolingians, but were stopped at the Oise River by Charles' opponents who traded their cooperation for more territorial concessions. The need for an agreement was particularly urgent when Robert I, successor of Charles III, was killed in 923.

Rudolph was recorded as sponsoring a new agreement by which a group of Norsemen conceded the provinces of the Bessin and Maine. These settlers were presumed to be Rollo and his associates, moving their authority westward from the Seine valley. It is still unclear as to whether Rollo was being given lordship over the Vikings already settled in the region to domesticate and restrain them, or the Franks around Bayeux to protect them from other Viking leaders settled in eastern Brittany and the Cotentin Peninsula.

Rollo died sometime between a final mention of him by Flodoard in 928, and 933 – the year in which a third grant of land, usually identified as being the Cotentin and Avranchin areas, was given to his son and successor William.

== Rollo's role in Norman conversion to Christianity ==
In Dudo's story of Rollo, he had a vision in which he was on a high mountain on a Frankish dwelling, where he washed himself in a stream and rid himself of the diseases with which he was infected. He then saw birds of all kinds gather around the mountain and wash themselves in this stream, which remained together as a whole group and found twigs to build nests. This dream was interpreted to mean that the mountain was the Church, the diseases of which he rid himself were his sins being washed away and his being born again in the baptism. The birds of different types represented the different armies and common people having their sins washed away and communities joined. The nests were the walls of the city to be rebuilt, and all were to bow down to Rollo to serve him. Rollo carried this vision with him throughout his journey to Normandy. Once he arrived and was granted land, he dedicated different sections of land to God, saints, and various churches. He was baptised and spread the word of Christianity to his followers.

This account of Rollo's role in Christianity has been long debated by scholars. Recently, Gilduin Davy has emphasized the role of Rollo's law-making (over his conversion) as the cause of the civilization of Normandy. D. C. Douglas has argued that Rollo's and his companions' conversion was only formal at first and paganism was still practiced.

== Descendants ==
A genealogical chart of the Norman dynasty

Rollo's son and heir, William Longsword, and grandchild, Richard the Fearless, forged the Duchy of Normandy into West Francia's most cohesive and formidable principality. The descendants of Rollo and his men assimilated with the Frankish culture and became known as the Normans, lending their name to the region of Normandy.

Rollo was the great-great-great-grandfather of William the Conqueror, the progenitor of House of Normandy in England. As such, Charles III and the current British royal family are descendants of Rollo, albeit not in the direct male line. Henry I of England was the last monarch of the House of Normandy. His daughter Empress Matilda was an ancestor of the English House of Plantagenet and subsequent English monarchs.

A genetic investigation into the remains of Rollo's grandson Richard the Fearless, and his great-grandson Richard the Good, was launched in 2011 to discern the origins of the historic Viking leader. On 29 February 2016, Norwegian researchers opened Richard the Good's tomb and found a lower jaw with eight teeth in it. However, the skeletal remains in both graves turned out to significantly predate Rollo and therefore are not related to him.

House of Normandy Family tree

Count of Rouen, 911
Rollo d. between 928 and 933; 1st Norman count of Rouen r. 911–927; House of Normandy
William "Longsword" c. 893–942; 2nd Norman count of Rouen r. 927–942
Duke of Normandy, 942
Richard I "the Fearless"; 932–996; 1st Duke of Normandy r. 942–996
Richard II "the Good" d. 1026; 2nd Duke of Normandy r. 996–1027	Robert; Count of Évreux, Archbishop of Rouen	Mauger c. 988–1032 m. Germain, Countess of Corbeil	Geoffrey d. c. 1010; Count of Eu	William I 978–after 1057; Count of Eu and Hiémois
House of Clare
Richard III; 997/1001–1027; 3rd Duke of Normandy r. 1026–1027	Robert I "the Magnificent"; 1000–1035; 4th Duke of Normandy r. 1027–1035	Richard c. 1015–1067; Count of Évreux	Ralph de Gacé d. 1051; Lord of Gacé
Illegitimate
Nicolas of Normandy c. 1027–1092; Abbot of Saint Ouen	William II (of Normandy) "the Conqueror" c. 1028–1087; 5th Duke of Normandy r. 1035–1087, King of England as "William I" r. 1066–1087	William c. 1015–1067; Count of Évreux
Robert II "Curthose" c. 1051–1134; 6th Duke of Normandy r. 1087–1106	Richard c. 1054–1070	Adela c. 1067–1137 m. Stephen II, Count of Blois	William II (of England) "Rufus" c. 1057–1100; King of England r. 1087–1100; Ducal Regent r. 1096–1100	Henry I "Beauclerc" c. 1068–1135; King of England r. 1100–1135, 7th Duke of Normandy r. 1106–1135
Illegitimate→
William Clito; 1102–1128; Count of Flanders; Ducal claimant	Stephen; 1092/1096–1154; King of England r. 1135–1154, 8th Duke of Normandy r. 1135–1144	Henry V 1081/1086–1125; King of Germany, Holy Roman Emperor	Matilda I c. 1102–1167; Lady of the English "Empress Matilda"	Geoffrey Plantagenet; 1113–1151; Count of Anjou, 9th Duke of Normandy r. 1144–1150	William III Adelin; 1103–1120; Duke of Normandy 1120 in his father's lifetime	Robert I c. 1090–1147; 1st Earl of Gloucester	Richard of Lincoln before 1101–1120	Reginald c. 1100–1175; 1st Earl of Cornwall	Robert FitzEdith; 1093–1172 m. Matilda d'Avranches, Baroness of Okehampton	Gilbert FitzRoy	Henry FitzRoy c. 1100/1104–1158	Fulk FitzRoy c. 1092–1132; Monk at Abingdon?
House of Blois	House of Salians	House of Plantagenet
Illegitimate→
Henry II "Curtmantle"; 1133–1189; 10th Duke of Normandy r. 1150–1189; King of England r. 1154–1189	William FitzRobert; 1116–1183; 2nd Earl of Gloucester	Roger of Worcester c. 1134–1179; Bishop of Worcester	Richard d. 1142; Bishop of Bayeux	Meiler Fitzhenry d. 1220; Lord Chief Justice of Ireland
Henry "the Young King"; 1155–1183; Duke of Normandy r. 1170–1183 in his father's lifetime	Richard IV "Lionheart"; 1157–1199; 11th Duke of Normandy, King of England as "Richard I" r. 1189–1199	John "Lackland"; 1166–1216; 12th Duke of Normandy, King of England r. 1199–1216
Henry III; 1207–1272; 13th Duke of Normandy r. 1216–1259; King of England r. 1216–1272
Duchy of Normandy renounced at Treaty of Paris, 1259

== Legacy ==
Rollo's dynasty survived through a combination of ruthless military action and infighting among the 10th-century Frankish aristocracy, which left them severely weakened and unable to resist the Rouen Vikings' growing determination to stay put. After Rollo's death, his direct male descendants continued to rule Normandy until Stephen of Blois became King of England and Duke of Normandy in 1135. The duchy was later absorbed into what became the Angevin Empire following its conquest by Geoffrey of Anjou, who in 1128 had married Matilda of England, herself a descendant of Rollo.

Rollo left a legacy as the founder of Normandy, and his leadership and integration of Viking settlers into the region transformed it into a stable political entity. His lineage played a key role in shaping medieval Europe, as it was William the Conqueror, another descendant of Rollo, who famously led the Norman Conquest of England in 1066. Rollo's baptism also marked a significant point in the assimilation of Viking settlers into Frankish society.

== Depictions in fiction ==
Rollo is the subject of the 17th-century play Rollo Duke of Normandy, also known as The Bloody Brother, written by John Fletcher, Philip Massinger, Ben Jonson, and George Chapman. The similarities to Rollo are slim, as the play draws inspiration from Herodian's account of the rivalry between Emperor Severus's sons, Geta and Antonine. However, the setting shifts from ancient Rome to medieval France, with the brothers reimagined as Otto and Rollo. Initially appointed as co-rulers of the kingdom, Rollo seizes sole power by killing Otto. His reign, marked by tyranny, ultimately ends when he is killed in retribution for his oppressive rule.

A character, broadly inspired by the historical Rollo but including many events predating the historical Rollo's birth, played by Clive Standen, is Ragnar Lothbrok's brother in the History Channel television series Vikings. Rollo was staying in West Francia to maintain the Viking's hold on the Seine, as a spot to lead future raids. But, the Franks are able to sway him to betray his brother and go through with an acceptance of land and a marriage to the princess Gisla. There are similarities in this story seen in Dudo's, as Rollo settled in West Francia, although there is no mention of betrayal to his brother. He also in the Dudo account marries Charles the Simple's daughter, which is similar to his marriage of princess Gisla.

Rollo is a character in the video game Assassin's Creed Valhalla.

French nobility
New title	Count of Rouen; 911–927	Succeeded by William I
