= Duchess of Normandy =

The Duchess of Normandy was the wife of the Duke of Normandy.

== Duchess of Normandy ==
=== First Creation ===
==== House of Normandy, 911–1135 ====
Picture	Name	Father	Birth	Marriage	Became Duchess	Ceased to be Duchess	Death	Spouse Kieran Real
	Poppa of Bayeux	Berenger of Bayeux (perhaps Berengar II of Neustria)	-	886, or after	911 husband's ascension	after 912 (repudiated) or later	-	Rollo
	Gisela of France (perhaps apocryphal)	Charles the Simple (Carolingian)	-	912		before her husband's death		Rollo
–	Luitgarde of Vermandois	Herbert II, Count of Vermandois (Carolingian)	-	940		17 December 942 husband's death	9 February 978 or 14 November, after 977	William I
–	Emma of Paris	Hugh the Great (Robertian)	-	960		after 19 March 968		Richard I
	Gunnora	-	-	before 989		20 November 996 husband's death	5 January 1031	Richard I
–	Judith of Brittany	Conan I, Duke of Brittany (Rennes)	-	996/1000		16 June 1017		Richard II
–	Papia of Envermeu	-	-	-		28 August 1027 husband's death	after 1047	Richard II
–	Adela of France	Robert II of France (Capet)	1009	1027		1027		Richard III
	Matilda of Flanders	Baldwin V, Count of Flanders (Flanders)	1031	1053		2 November 1083		William II (William I of England)
–	Sybilla of Conversano	Geoffrey, Count of Conversano	-	1100		21 March 1103		Robert II
	Matilda of Scotland	Malcolm III of Scotland (Dunkeld)	1080	11 November 1100	28 September 1106 husband's ascension	1 May 1118		Henry I
–	Matilda of Anjou	Fulk V, Count of Anjou (Anjou)	1101–07	June 1119	1120 husband's ascension	25 November 1120 husband's death	1154	William III Adelin
	Adeliza of Louvain	Godfrey I, Count of Louvain (Louvain)	1103	24 January 1121		1 December 1135 husband's death	23 April 1151	Henry I

==== House of Blois, 1135–1154 ====
Picture	Name	Father	Birth	Marriage	Became Duchess	Ceased to be Duchess	Death	Spouse
	Matilda of Boulogne	Eustace III, Count of Boulogne (Boulogne)	1105	1125	22 December 1135 husband's ascension	19 January 1144; Normandy losted to Anjou	3 May 1152	Stephen

==== House of Plantagenet, 1144–1204 ====
Picture	Name	Father	Birth	Marriage	Became Duchess	Ceased to be Duchess	Death	Spouse
	Matilda of England	Henry I of England (Normandy)	7 February 1101	17 June 1128	19 January 1144 husband's ascension	1150 husband's abdication	10 September 1167	Geoffrey Plantagenet
	Eleanor of Aquitaine	William X, Duke of Aquitaine (Ramnulfid)	1122	18 May 1152		6 July 1189 husband's death	1 April 1204	Henry II
	Margaret of France	Louis VII of France (Capet)	1157	1162	1170 husband's accession	11 June 1183 husband's death	1197	Henry the Young King
	Berengaria of Navarre	Sancho VI of Navarre (Jiménez)	between 1165 and 1170	12 May 1191		6 April 1199 husband's death	23 December 1230	Richard IV (Richard I of England)
	Isabella of Angoulême	Aymer Taillefer, Count of Angoulême (Taillefer)	1188	24 August 1200		1204 husband's loss of Normandy	31 May 1246	John

=== Second Creation ===
==== House of Valois, 1332–1350 ====
Picture	Name	Father	Birth	Marriage	Became Duchess	Ceased to be Duchess	Death	Spouse
	Bonne of Bohemia	John of Bohemia (Luxembourg)	20 May 1315	6 August 1332	c. 1332 title created	11 September 1349		John II
	Joanna I of Auvergne	William XII, Count of Auvergne and Boulogne (Auvergne)	8 May 1326	13 February 1349		22 August 1350 became Queen consort of France	29 September 1360	John II

=== Third Creation ===
==== House of Valois, 1355–1364 ====
Picture	Name	Father	Birth	Marriage	Became Duchess	Ceased to be Duchess	Death	Spouse
	Joan of Bourbon	Peter I, Duke of Bourbon (Bourbon)	3 February 1338	8 April 1350	7 December 1355 husband's accession	8 April 1364 became Queen consort of France	6 February 1378	Charles I (Charles V of France)

=== Fourth Creation ===
==== House of Valois, 1465–1472 ====
None

=== Fifth Creation ===
==== House of Bourbon, 1785–1789 ====
None
