= Duke of Normandy =

Medieval ruler of the Duchy of Normandy

- Coat of arms of Normandy
- Creation date: 911
- First holder: Rollo

In the Middle Ages, the duke of Normandy was the ruler of the Duchy of Normandy. The duchy arose out of a grant of land to the Viking leader Rollo by the French king Charles the Simple in 911. In 924 and again in 933, Normandy was expanded by royal grant. Rollo's male-line descendants continued to rule it until 1135, and cognatic descendants ruled it until 1204. In 1202 King Philip II of France declared Normandy a forfeited fief and by 1204 his army had conquered it (with the exception of the Channel Islands). It remained a French royal province thereafter, still called the Duchy of Normandy, but only occasionally granted to a duke of the royal house as an appanage.

Despite both the 13th century loss of mainland Normandy, the renunciation of the title by King Henry III of England in the Treaty of Paris (1259), and the extinction of the duchy itself in modern-day France, the monarch of the United Kingdom is regardless still often informally referred to by the title "duke of Normandy". This is the title used whether the monarch is a king or a queen.

== History of the title ==
There is no record of Rollo holding or using any title. His son and grandson, William Longsword and Richard I, used the titles "count" (Latin comes or consul) and "prince" (princeps). Prior to 1066, the most common title of the ruler of Normandy was "count of Normandy" (comes Normanniae) or "Count of the Normans" (comes Normannorum). The title Count of Rouen (comes Rotomagensis) was never used in any official document, but it was used of William I and his son by the anonymous author of a lament (planctus) on his death. Defying Norman pretensions to the ducal title, Adhemar de Chabannes was still referring to the Norman ruler as "Count of Rouen" as late as the 1020s. In the 12th century, the Icelandic historian Ari Thorgilsson in his Landnámabók referred to Rollo as Ruðu jarl (earl of Rouen), the only attested form in Old Norse, although too late to be evidence for 10th-century practice. The late 11th-century Norman historian William of Poitiers used the title "Count of Rouen" for the Norman rulers down to Richard II. According to David C. Douglas, the title "Count of Rouen" (comes Rotomagensis) was never used in any official document. Charters are usually a source of information about titles, but none exist for Normandy in the middle of the tenth century.

The first official recorded use of the title duke (dux) is in an act in favour of the Abbey of Fécamp in 1006 by Richard II. Earlier, the writer Richer of Reims had called Richard I a dux pyratorum, but which only means "leader of pirates" and was not a title. During the reign of Richard II, the French king's chancery began to call the Norman ruler "duke of the Normans" (dux Normannorum) for the first time. As late as the reign of William the Conqueror (1035–87), the ruler of Normandy could style himself "prince and duke, count of Normandy" as if unsure what his title should be. The literal Latin equivalent of "duke of Normandy", dux Normanniae, was in use by 1066, but it did not supplant dux Normannorum until the Angevin period (1144–1204), at a time when Norman identity was fading.

Richard I experimented with the title "marquis" (marchio) as early as 966, when it was also used in a diploma of King Lothair. Richard II occasionally used it, but he seems to have preferred the title duke. It is his preference for the ducal title in his own charters that has led historians to believe that it was the chosen title of the Norman rulers. Certainly it was not granted to them by the French king. In the twelfth century, the Abbey of Fécamp spread the legend that it had been granted to Richard II by Pope Benedict VIII (ruled 1012–24). The French chancery did not regularly employ it until after 1204, when the duchy had been seized by the crown and Normandy lost its autonomy and its native rulers.

The actual reason for the adoption of a higher title than that of count was that the rulers of Normandy began to grant the comital title to members of their own family. The creation of Norman counts subject to the ruler of Normandy necessitated the latter taking a higher title. The same process was at work in other principalities of France in the eleventh century, as the comital title came into wider use and thus depreciated. The Normans nevertheless kept the title of count for the ducal family and no non-family member was granted a county until Helias of Saint-Saëns was made count of Arques by Henry I in 1106.

From 1066, when William conquered England and became king, the ducal title was often held by the king of England. In 1087, William died and the title passed to his eldest son, Robert Curthose, while his second surviving son, William Rufus, inherited England. In 1096, Robert mortgaged Normandy to William, who was succeeded by another brother, Henry I, in 1100. In 1106, Henry conquered Normandy. It remained with the king of England down to 1144, when, during the civil war known as the Anarchy, it was conquered by Count Geoffrey V of Anjou. Geoffrey's son, Henry II, inherited Normandy (1150) and then England (1154), reuniting the two titles.

In 1202, King Philip II of France, as feudal suzerain, declared Normandy forfeit and by 1204 his armies had conquered it (with the exception of the Channel Islands). Henry III finally renounced the English claim in the Treaty of Paris (1259).

Thereafter, the continental part of the duchy formed an integral part of the French royal demesne. The kings of the House of Valois started a tradition of granting the title to their heirs apparent. The title was granted four times (1332, 1350, 1465, 1785) between the French conquest of Normandy and the dissolution of the French monarchy in 1792. The French Revolution brought an end to the Duchy of Normandy as a political entity, by then a province of France, and it was replaced by several départements.

== List of dukes of Normandy (911–1204) ==
=== House of Normandy (911–1135) ===
Portrait	Name Lifespan	Reign	Marriage(s)	Relation to predecessor(s)	Other titles
	Rollo (Rollon) c. 835/870 – 928/933	911–928	(1) Poppa of Bayeux more danico one son and one daughter (2) Gisela of France existence uncertain	Granted by the Treaty of Saint-Clair-sur-Epte	No official title(s).
	William I Longsword (Gllâome I) 893 – 17 December 942	927–17 December 942	(1) Sprota more danico one son (2) Luitgarde of Vermandois no issue (m. before 940)	Son of Rollo	
	Richard I the Fearless (R'chard Sans-Peur) 28 August 932 – 20 November 996	17 December 942 – 20 November 996	(1) Emma of Paris no issue (m.960; died 968) (2) Gunnor seven children (m. c. 989)	Son of William I	Called Count of Normandy in primary sources
	Richard II the Good (R'chard le Bouon) 978 – 28 August 1026	996–1026	(1) Judith of Brittany six children (m.1000; died 1017) (2) Popia of Envermeu two children (m.1017)	Son of Richard I	
	Richard III (R'chard III) 997/1001 – 6 August 1027	28 August 1026 – 6 August 1027	never married	Son of Richard II	
	Robert I the Magnificent (Robèrt le Magnifique) 22 June 1000 – 1–3 July 1035	1027–1035	never married Had extramarital relationship to Herleva one son and one daughter	Brother of Richard III	
	William II the Conqueror (Gllâome le Contchérant) c. 1028 – 9 September 1087	c. at least 1036 – 9 September 1087	Matilda of Flanders ten children (m.1051/2; died 1083)	Son of Robert I	King of England
	Robert II Curthose (Robèrt Courtheuse) c. 1051 – 3 February 1134	9 September 1087 – 1106	Sybilla of Conversano one son (m.1100; died 18 March 1103)	Oldest son of William II	
	Henry I Beauclerc (Henri I Beauclerc) c. 1068 – 1 December 1135	1106 – 1 December 1135	(1) Matilda of Scotland one son and one daughter (m.1100; died 1118) (2) Adeliza of Louvain no issue (m. 1121)	Brother of Robert II Son of William II	King of England
	William (III) Clito (Gllâome Cliton) 25 October 1102 – 28 July 1128 (Claimant)	1106–1128	(1) Sibylla of Anjou no issue (m. 1123; annulled 1124) (2) Joanna of Montferrat no issue (m. 1127; died 1128)	Eldest son of Robert Curthose	Count of Flanders

=== House of Blois (1135–1144) ===
Portrait	Name Lifespan	Reign	Marriage(s)	Relationship with predecessor(s)	Other titles
	Stephen (Étienne) 1092/1096 – 25 October 1154	1135–1144	Matilda I, Countess of Boulogne five children (m. 1136; died 1152)	Grandson of William II through Adela of Normandy Nephew of Henry I	King of England

=== House of Plantagenet (1144–1204) ===
Portrait	Name Lifespan	Reign	Marriage(s)	Relationship with predecessor(s)	Other titles	Other Details
	Geoffrey the Handsome (Geffrai le Biau) 24 August 1113 – 7 September 1151	1144–1150	Matilda of England three children (m. 1128)	Son-in-law of Henry I	Count of Anjou	Conquered Normandy from Stephen I.
	Henry II; Curtmantle (Henri Court-manté) 5 March 1133 – 6 July 1189	1150 – 6 July 1189	Eleanor of Aquitaine eight children (m. 1152)	Son of Geoffrey First cousin, once removed of Stephen	King of England	
Henry II named his son, Henry the Young King (1155–1183), as co-ruler with him but this was a Norman custom of designating an heir, and the younger Henry did not outlive his father and rule in his own right, so he is not counted as a duke on lists of dukes.
	Richard IV the Lionheart (R'chard le Quor de Lion) 8 September 1157 – 6 April 1199	3 September 1189 – 6 April 1199	Berengaria of Navarre no issue (m. 1191)	Son of Henry II	King of England	
	John; Lackland (Jean sans Terre) 24 December 1166 – 1204	1199 – 1204	(1) Isabella, Countess of Gloucester no issue (m. 1189; annulled 1199) (2) Isabella, Countess of Angoulême five children (m. 1200)	Brother of Richard IV Son of Henry II	King of England; Lord of Ireland	Lost mainland Normandy in 1204

== French province (1204–1792) ==
In 1204, the King of France confiscated the continental part of the Duchy of Normandy (the Channel Islands remaining under English control) and subsumed it into the crown lands of France. Thereafter, the ducal title was held by several French princes.

In 1332, King Philip VI gave the Duchy in appanage to his son John, who became king John II of France in 1350. He in turn gave the Duchy in appanage to his son Charles, who became king Charles V of France in 1364. In 1465, Louis XI, under constraint, gave the Duchy to his brother Charles de Valois, Duke of Berry. Charles was unable to hold the Duchy and in 1466 it was again subsumed into the crown lands and remained a permanent part of them. The title was conferred on a few junior members of the French royal family before the abolition of the French monarchy in 1792.

- John (son of King Philip VI, later King John II of France), 1332–1350.
- Charles (son of John II of France, later King Charles V of France), 1350–1364
- Charles (brother of Louis XI of France, also Duke of Berry), 1465–1466
- James, Duke of York, later King James II of England. On 31 December 1660, a few months after the restoration of Charles II to the thrones of England and Scotland, King Louis XIV proclaimed Charles's younger brother, James, Duke of York, "Duke of Normandy". This was probably done as a political gesture of support.
- Louis-Charles (son of Louis XVI, later Dauphin 1789–1791 and titular King Louis XVII 1792–1795), 1785–1792.

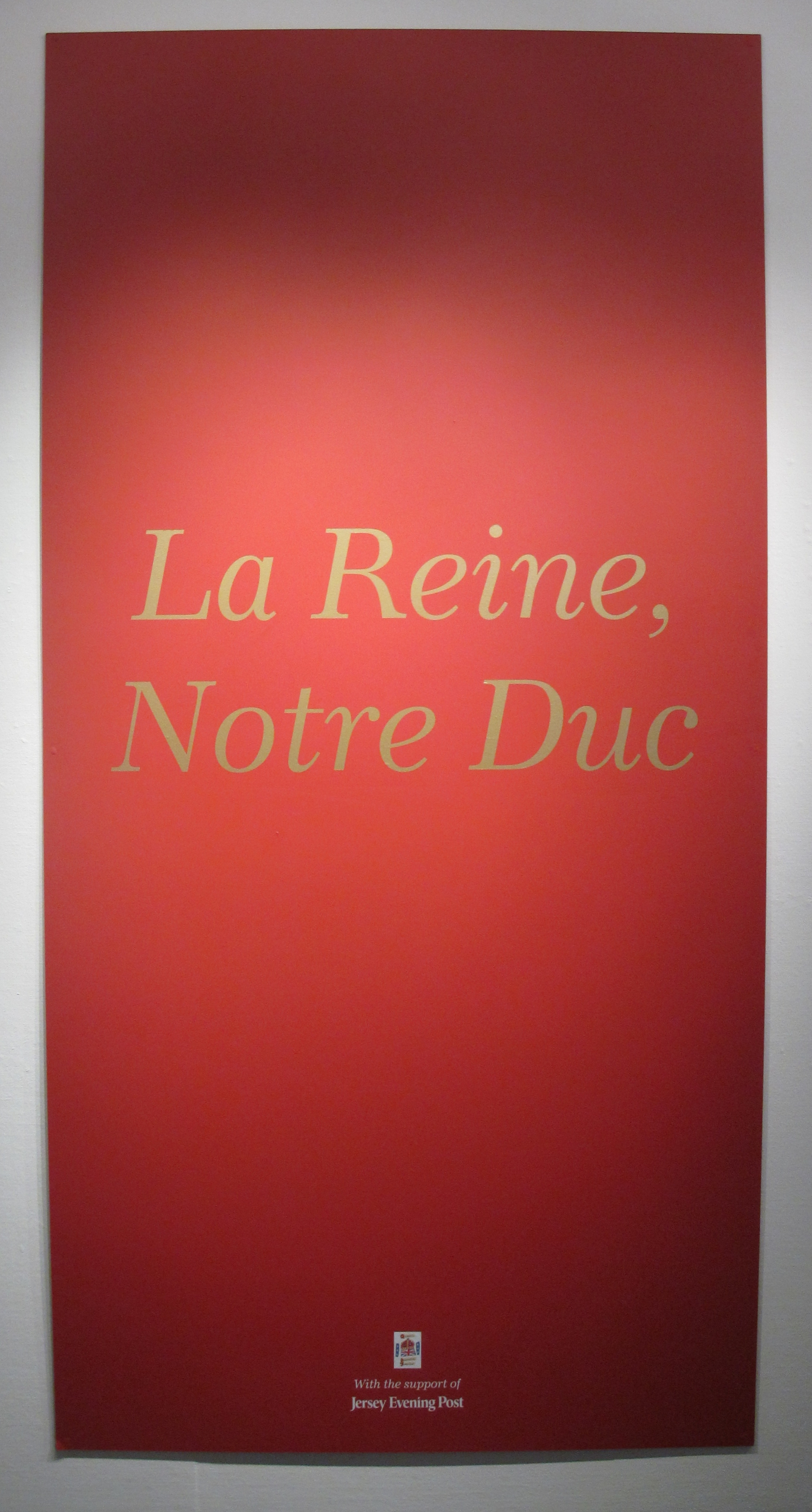
"La Reine, Notre Duc" (The Queen, Our Duke): title of a Diamond Jubilee exhibition at the Jersey Arts Centre in the Channel Islands

== Modern usage ==
In the Channel Islands, the British monarch is known informally as the "Duke of Normandy", irrespective of whether or not the holder is male (Queen Elizabeth II, for instance, was known by this title). The Channel Islands are the last remaining part of the former Duchy of Normandy to remain under the rule of the British monarch. Although the English monarchy relinquished claims to continental Normandy and other French claims in 1259 (in the Treaty of Paris), the Channel Islands (except for Chausey under French sovereignty) remain Crown dependencies of the British throne.

However, the king is customarily referred to as "The Duke of Normandy", the title used by the islanders, especially during their loyal toast, where they say, "The Duke of Normandy, our King", or "The King, our Duke", "L'Rouai, nouotre Duc" or "L'Roué, note Du" in Norman (Jèrriais and Guernésiais respectively), or "Le Roi, notre Duc" in Standard French, rather than simply "The King", as is the practice in the United Kingdom.

...Queen Elizabeth II is often referred to by her traditional and conventional title of Duke of Normandy. However [...] she is not the Duke in a constitutional capacity and instead governs in her right as Queen [...] This notwithstanding, it is a matter of local pride for monarchists to treat the situation otherwise: the Loyal Toast at formal dinners is to 'The Queen, our Duke' rather than 'Her Majesty, the Queen' as in the UK."

The title 'Duke of Normandy' is not used in formal government publications, and, as a matter of Channel Islands law, does not exist.

Although Henry III of England formally renounced the ducal title over mainland Normandy in the Treaty of Paris (1259), the Channel Islands have continued to be governed under the original Norman feudal framework that existed during the duchy. When continental Normandy was lost to the French crown in 1204, the chief tenants of the islands – the Seigneurs holding their fiefs directly from the Crown – chose to remain loyal to the English sovereign rather than to the new French duchy, preserving the feudal structure and customary law under which they had always been governed and maintaining the former ducal relationship – a continuity never formally interrupted since the Norman grants of the tenth and eleventh centuries. Acts of the Westminster Parliament do not apply unless expressly extended to them.

This relationship continues to find institutional expression through the survival of fundamental feudal structures within the Bailiwicks. In Guernsey, the Court of Chief Pleas (Guernsey) Law, 2004 codifies the statutory obligation of the holders of eleven specified fiefs to perform Secta Curiae (suit of court); a parallel obligation is fulfilled in Jersey through the Assize d'Héritage. By attending and performing suit of court, the Seigneurs formally renew their tenure in capite from the Crown, maintaining the same jurisdictional framework through which the Sovereign exercises authority in the islands under Norman customary law, thus confirming the constitutional specificity of the islands.

== Statue ==
A statue of the first seven dukes was erected in Falaise in Normandy in the 19th century. It depicts William the Conqueror, the Duke of Normandy and later King of England, on a horse, and is surrounded by statues of his six predecessors.

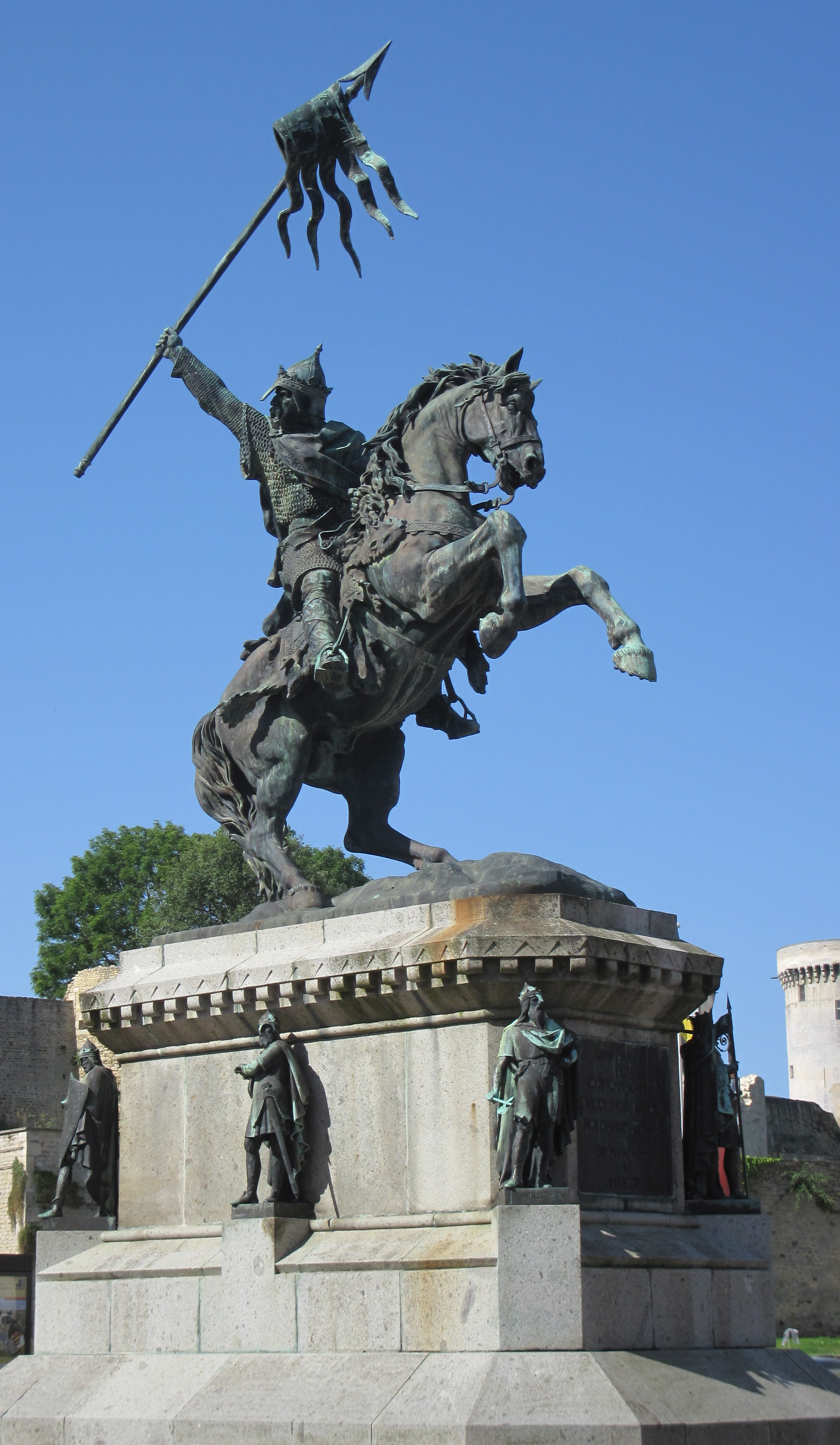
Statue of William the Conqueror in Falaise (surrounded by six other Dukes of Normandy)

== Family trees ==
Family tree of the early dukes of Normandy and Norman kings of England

House of Normandy Family tree

Count of Rouen, 911
Rollo d. between 928 and 933; 1st Norman count of Rouen r. 911–927; House of Normandy
William "Longsword" c. 893–942; 2nd Norman count of Rouen r. 927–942
Duke of Normandy, 942
Richard I "the Fearless"; 932–996; 1st Duke of Normandy r. 942–996
Richard II "the Good" d. 1026; 2nd Duke of Normandy r. 996–1027	Robert; Count of Évreux, Archbishop of Rouen	Mauger c. 988–1032 m. Germain, Countess of Corbeil	Geoffrey d. c. 1010; Count of Eu	William I 978–after 1057; Count of Eu and Hiémois
House of Clare
Richard III; 997/1001–1027; 3rd Duke of Normandy r. 1026–1027	Robert I "the Magnificent"; 1000–1035; 4th Duke of Normandy r. 1027–1035	Richard c. 1015–1067; Count of Évreux	Ralph de Gacé d. 1051; Lord of Gacé
Illegitimate
Nicolas of Normandy c. 1027–1092; Abbot of Saint Ouen	William II (of Normandy) "the Conqueror" c. 1028–1087; 5th Duke of Normandy r. 1035–1087, King of England as "William I" r. 1066–1087	William c. 1015–1067; Count of Évreux
Robert II "Curthose" c. 1051–1134; 6th Duke of Normandy r. 1087–1106	Richard c. 1054–1070	Adela c. 1067–1137 m. Stephen II, Count of Blois	William II (of England) "Rufus" c. 1057–1100; King of England r. 1087–1100; Ducal Regent r. 1096–1100	Henry I "Beauclerc" c. 1068–1135; King of England r. 1100–1135, 7th Duke of Normandy r. 1106–1135
Illegitimate→
William Clito; 1102–1128; Count of Flanders; Ducal claimant	Stephen; 1092/1096–1154; King of England r. 1135–1154, 8th Duke of Normandy r. 1135–1144	Henry V 1081/1086–1125; King of Germany, Holy Roman Emperor	Matilda I c. 1102–1167; Lady of the English "Empress Matilda"	Geoffrey Plantagenet; 1113–1151; Count of Anjou, 9th Duke of Normandy r. 1144–1150	William III Adelin; 1103–1120; Duke of Normandy 1120 in his father's lifetime	Robert I c. 1090–1147; 1st Earl of Gloucester	Richard of Lincoln before 1101–1120	Reginald c. 1100–1175; 1st Earl of Cornwall	Robert FitzEdith; 1093–1172 m. Matilda d'Avranches, Baroness of Okehampton	Gilbert FitzRoy	Henry FitzRoy c. 1100/1104–1158	Fulk FitzRoy c. 1092–1132; Monk at Abingdon?
House of Blois	House of Salians	House of Plantagenet
Illegitimate→
Henry II "Curtmantle"; 1133–1189; 10th Duke of Normandy r. 1150–1189; King of England r. 1154–1189	William FitzRobert; 1116–1183; 2nd Earl of Gloucester	Roger of Worcester c. 1134–1179; Bishop of Worcester	Richard d. 1142; Bishop of Bayeux	Meiler Fitzhenry d. 1220; Lord Chief Justice of Ireland
Henry "the Young King"; 1155–1183; Duke of Normandy r. 1170–1183 in his father's lifetime	Richard IV "Lionheart"; 1157–1199; 11th Duke of Normandy, King of England as "Richard I" r. 1189–1199	John "Lackland"; 1166–1216; 12th Duke of Normandy, King of England r. 1199–1216
Henry III; 1207–1272; 13th Duke of Normandy r. 1216–1259; King of England r. 1216–1272
Duchy of Normandy renounced at Treaty of Paris, 1259
