= Gilbert, Count of Brionne =

French nobleman (1000–1040)

Gilbert de Brionne
- Count of Eu: 1015–1040
- Predecessor: Geoffrey
- Successor: William I
- Born: c. 1000
- Died: 1040; Échauffour, Normandy
- Family: House of Normandy/de Clare
- Issue: Richard Fitz Gilbert; Baldwin FitzGilbert
- Father: Geoffrey, Count of Eu
- Mother: Unknown

Gilbert (or Giselbert) de Brionne, Count of Eu and of Brionne (c. 1000 – c. 1040), was an influential nobleman in the Duchy of Normandy in Northern France. He was one of the early guardians of Duke William II in his minority, and a first cousin to William's father Duke Robert.

== Life ==
Gilbert de Brionne was son of Geoffrey, Count of Eu (otherwise cited as 'Godfrey'), who was an illegitimate child of Richard I of Normandy. He inherited Brionne, becoming one of the most powerful landowners in Normandy. Gilbert was a generous benefactor to Bec Abbey founded by his former knight Herluin in 1031. When Robert I died in 1035, his illegitimate son William inherited his father's title and several powerful nobles, including Gilbert of Brionne, Osbern the Seneschal and Alan of Brittany, became William's guardians.

== Death ==
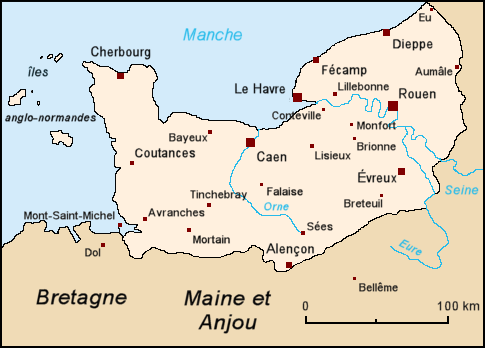
Map of the Duchy of Normandy

A number of Norman barons, including Ralph de Gacé, refused to accept William as their leader. In 1040 an attempt was made to kill William but the plot failed. Gilbert however was murdered while he was peaceably riding near Echauffour. It is believed two of his killers were Ralph of Wacy and Robert de Vitot. This appears to have been an act of vengeance for the wrongs inflicted upon the orphan children of Giroie by Gilbert, and it is not clear what Ralph de Gacé had to do in the business. (Note: Although, Ralph de Gacé was the brother-in-law of Hawisa d'Échauffour, daughter of Giroie. See: Schwennicke, ES II, 79; ES III/4, 697.)

Fearing they might meet their father's fate, Gilbert's sons Richard and Baldwin were conveyed by their friends to the court of Baldwin V, Count of Flanders. Gilbert's children would accompany Duke William on his conquest of England and his descendants would become one of the most powerful noble families in the British isles. They would rule over vast lands in modern-day Ireland, Scotland, and England and become powerful Marcher Lords.

== Children ==
Gilbert de Brionne married Gunnor d'Aunou and with her had the following children:

- Sir Richard fitz Gilbert (Richard de Clare) (bef. 1035 – c. 1090), m. Rohese Giffard (1034 – aft. 1113), daughter of Walter Giffard, Lord of Longueville
- Baldwin FitzGilbert (d. 1090)
- William (died after 29 August 1060)
- Adela (died August 1092), m. Neel II, Viscount of Cotentin (fr)
- Emma, m. Hugh de Waft
- Hesilia, m. William Malet, Honour of Eye (Note: The "Eye Priory Cartulary and Charters" state Hesilia was the daughter of Gilbert of Crispin.)

== Sources ==
- Altschul, Michael (1965). A Baronial Family in Medieval England: The Clares, 1217-1314. The Johns Hopkins University Press.
- Brown, Vivien, ed. (1994). Eye Priory Cartulary and Charters. Vol. 2. The Boydell Press.
- Davis, Paul R. (2013). Three Chevrons Red The Clares: A Marcher Dynasty in Wales, England and Ireland. Logaston Press. ISBN 978-1-906663-80-3.
