= House of Normandy =

Scandinavian rulers of Northern France and England

House of Normandy Rollonides
- Traditional coat of arms of Normandy
- Country: Normandy; England; Flanders
- Founded: 911
- Founder: Rollo
- Final ruler: Henry I of England or Matilda (disputed)
- Titles: King of England; Duke of Normandy; Count of Flanders; Count of Rouen
- Dissolution: 1167
- Deposition: 1135
- Cadet branches: Illegitimate lines: House of Clare; House of FitzWalter, Baron FitzWalter; House of Devereux, Viscounts Hereford; House of FitzRobert, Earls of Gloucester; House of Dunstanville, Earls of Cornwall; House of Eu, Counts of Eu

The House of Normandy (Norman: Maison de Nouormandie [mɛ.zɔ̃ d̪e nɔʁ.mɛnde]), also called the Rollonides, was a noble family originating from the Duchy of Normandy. The House of Normandy's lineage began with the Scandinavian Rollo who founded the Duchy of Normandy in 911.

The House of Normandy includes members who were dukes of Normandy, counts of Rouen, as well as kings of England following the Norman conquest of England in 1066. It lasted until Stephen of the French House of Blois seized the Duchy of Normandy in 1135. The house emerged from the union between the Viking Rollo (first ruler of Normandy) and Poppa of Bayeux, a West Frankish noblewoman. William the Conqueror and his heirs down through 1135 were members of this dynasty.

After that it was disputed between William's grandchildren, Matilda, whose husband Geoffrey was the founder of the House of Plantagenet, and Stephen of the House of Blois (or Blesevin dynasty).

== Members ==
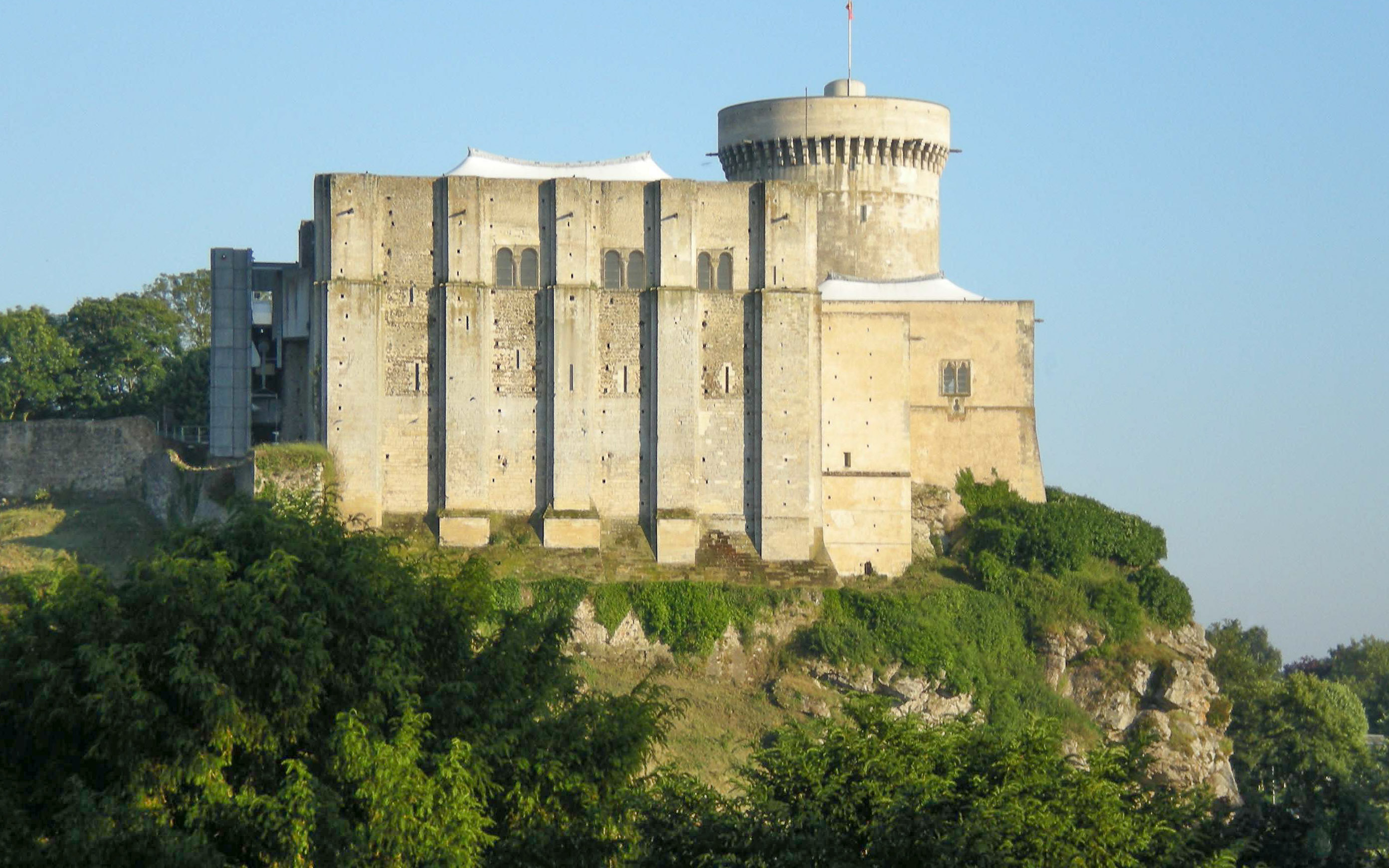
Château de Falaise, a Norman stronghold associated with the Dukes of Normandy

Counts of Rouen:

- Rollo, 911–927
- William Longsword, 927–942

Dukes of Normandy:

- Richard I, 942–996
- Richard II, 996–1027
- Richard III, 1026–1027
- Robert I, 1027–1035
- William II, 1035–1087
- Robert II, 1087–1106
- Henry I, 1106–1135
- William Adelin, 1120

Kings of England:

- William the Conqueror, 1066–1087 (became King of England as William the Conqueror)
- William II, 1087–1100
- Henry I, 1100–1135 (inherited the Duchy of Normandy from Robert II)
- Matilda, 1135–1153 (disputed)
- Stephen (non-agnatic; a member of the House of Blois), 1135–1154

Count of Flanders:

- William Clito (r. 1127–1128), son of Robert Curthose, great-grandson of Baldwin V, designated by Louis VI of France

Richard I had a daughter, Emma of Normandy, who was Queen consort through her two marriages to Æthelred the Unready and Cnut the Great.

== Family tree ==
House of Normandy Family tree

Count of Rouen, 911
Rollo d. between 928 and 933; 1st Norman count of Rouen r. 911–927; House of Normandy
William "Longsword" c. 893–942; 2nd Norman count of Rouen r. 927–942
Duke of Normandy, 942
Richard I "the Fearless"; 932–996; 1st Duke of Normandy r. 942–996
Richard II "the Good" d. 1026; 2nd Duke of Normandy r. 996–1027	Robert; Count of Évreux, Archbishop of Rouen	Mauger c. 988–1032 m. Germain, Countess of Corbeil	Geoffrey d. c. 1010; Count of Eu	William I 978–after 1057; Count of Eu and Hiémois
House of Clare
Richard III; 997/1001–1027; 3rd Duke of Normandy r. 1026–1027	Robert I "the Magnificent"; 1000–1035; 4th Duke of Normandy r. 1027–1035	Richard c. 1015–1067; Count of Évreux	Ralph de Gacé d. 1051; Lord of Gacé
Illegitimate
Nicolas of Normandy c. 1027–1092; Abbot of Saint Ouen	William II (of Normandy) "the Conqueror" c. 1028–1087; 5th Duke of Normandy r. 1035–1087, King of England as "William I" r. 1066–1087	William c. 1015–1067; Count of Évreux
Robert II "Curthose" c. 1051–1134; 6th Duke of Normandy r. 1087–1106	Richard c. 1054–1070	Adela c. 1067–1137 m. Stephen II, Count of Blois	William II (of England) "Rufus" c. 1057–1100; King of England r. 1087–1100; Ducal Regent r. 1096–1100	Henry I "Beauclerc" c. 1068–1135; King of England r. 1100–1135, 7th Duke of Normandy r. 1106–1135
Illegitimate→
William Clito; 1102–1128; Count of Flanders; Ducal claimant	Stephen; 1092/1096–1154; King of England r. 1135–1154, 8th Duke of Normandy r. 1135–1144	Henry V 1081/1086–1125; King of Germany, Holy Roman Emperor	Matilda I c. 1102–1167; Lady of the English "Empress Matilda"	Geoffrey Plantagenet; 1113–1151; Count of Anjou, 9th Duke of Normandy r. 1144–1150	William III Adelin; 1103–1120; Duke of Normandy 1120 in his father's lifetime	Robert I c. 1090–1147; 1st Earl of Gloucester	Richard of Lincoln before 1101–1120	Reginald c. 1100–1175; 1st Earl of Cornwall	Robert FitzEdith; 1093–1172 m. Matilda d'Avranches, Baroness of Okehampton	Gilbert FitzRoy	Henry FitzRoy c. 1100/1104–1158	Fulk FitzRoy c. 1092–1132; Monk at Abingdon?
House of Blois	House of Salians	House of Plantagenet
Illegitimate→
Henry II "Curtmantle"; 1133–1189; 10th Duke of Normandy r. 1150–1189; King of England r. 1154–1189	William FitzRobert; 1116–1183; 2nd Earl of Gloucester	Roger of Worcester c. 1134–1179; Bishop of Worcester	Richard d. 1142; Bishop of Bayeux	Meiler Fitzhenry d. 1220; Lord Chief Justice of Ireland
Henry "the Young King"; 1155–1183; Duke of Normandy r. 1170–1183 in his father's lifetime	Richard IV "Lionheart"; 1157–1199; 11th Duke of Normandy, King of England as "Richard I" r. 1189–1199	John "Lackland"; 1166–1216; 12th Duke of Normandy, King of England r. 1199–1216
Henry III; 1207–1272; 13th Duke of Normandy r. 1216–1259; King of England r. 1216–1272
Duchy of Normandy renounced at Treaty of Paris, 1259

Agnatic descendants of Rollo:

- Rollo, d. ~927, Count of Rouen 911–927
  - William Longsword, 893–942, Count of Rouen 927–942
    - Richard I of Normandy the Fearless, 932–996, Count of Rouen 942–996
      - Richard II, Duke of Normandy, the Good, d. 1026, Duke of Normandy 996–1026
        - Richard III, Duke of Normandy, 998–1027, Duke of Normandy 1026–1027
          - Nicolas of Normandy (illegitimate), 1027–1092, Abbot of Saint-Ouen 1042–1092
        - Robert I, Duke of Normandy, the Magnificent, 1000–1035, Duke of Normandy 1027–1035
          - William the Conqueror (illegitimate but succeeded as duke), 1028–1087, Duke of Normandy 1035–1087, King of England 1066–1087
            - Robert Curthose, 1051–1134, Duke of Normandy 1087–1106
              - William Clito, 1102–1128, Count of Flanders 1127–1128
            - Richard of Normandy, 1054–1070
            - William II of England, King of England 1087–1100
            - Henry I of England, King of England 1100–1135, Duke of Normandy 1106–1135 married Matilda of Scotland - Adeliza of Louvain
              - William Adelin, 1103–1120
              - Empress Matilda, 7 February 1102 – 10 September 1167 married Henry V, Holy Roman Emperor - Geoffrey Plantagenet, Count of Anjou >>> Henry II of England
              - various illegitimate children
        - William of Normandy, 1008–1025
        - Mauger, 1019–1055, Archbishop of Rouen 1037–1053
        - William of Talou, d. 1086, Count of Arques
      - Robert II, Archbishop of Rouen 989–1037, Count of Évreux 989–1037, Regent of Normandy 1035–1037
        - Richard, Count of Évreux, 1015–1067, Count of Évreux 1037–1067
          - William, Count of Évreux, Count of Évreux 1067–1118
        - Ralph de Gacé, the Ass-Headed, d. 1051
          - Robert de Gacé
        - William d'Évreux
        - Hugh De Lacy
          - multiple children
      - Mauger, Count of Corbeil, 988–1032
      - Geoffrey, Count of Eu (illegitimate), d. 1010, Count of Eu 996–1010
        - descendants
      - William I, Count of Eu (illegitimate), d. 1057, Count of Eu 1040–1057
        - descendants

== References and notes ==
Royal House House of Normandy
New title	Ruling House of the Duchy of Normandy; 911–1135	Succeeded by House of Blois
Preceded by House of Godwin	Ruling House of the Kingdom of England; 1066–1135	Succeeded by House of Blois
Preceded by House of Estridsen	Ruling House of the County of Flanders; 1127–1128	Succeeded by House of Alsace
New title	Ruling House of the County of Eu; 996–1246	Succeeded by House of Lusignan
