= Gerard Flaitel =

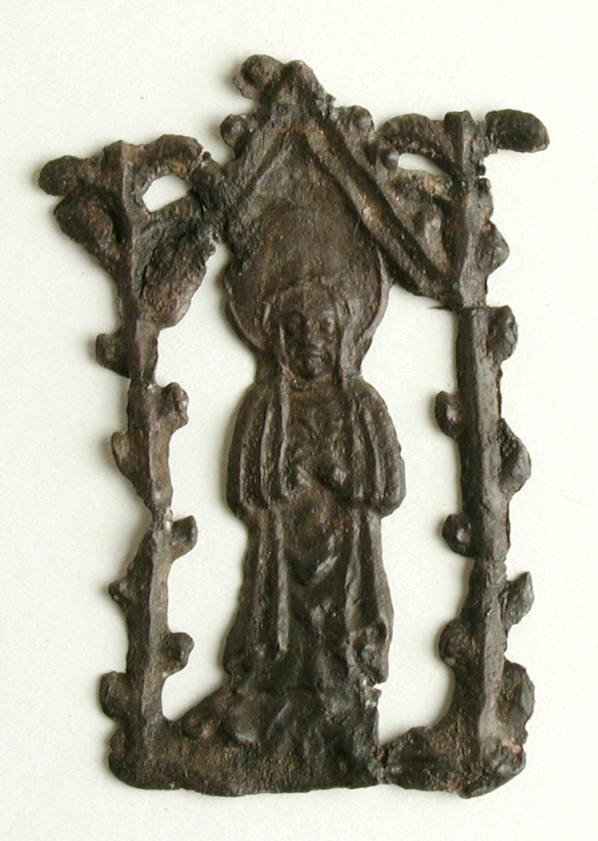
Medieval Pilgrim badge

Gerard Flaitel († c. 1047) was a Norman knight and a 'most powerful lord in Normandy at the time of the Richards' according to Orderic Vitalis.

== Life ==
Gerard was a Norman baron with substantial estates in the Pays de Caux, the Hiemois, the Evrecin and Risle valley. He was a vassal of William of Talou in Arques.

In 1035, when Robert I, Duke of Normandy left on a pilgrimage to Jerusalem, Gerard Flaitel was one of his companions. In the spring of 1035 the group left Normandy probably taking the favored route through the Danube river basin to Constantinople. Duke Robert obtained permission for him and his retinue to continue on to Muslim-controlled Jerusalem. In Turkey Robert paid the required mussella (pilgrim tax). They arrived in time to spend Holy Week in Jerusalem. On their return through Asia Minor, Duke Robert fell ill while they were in Nicaea, and died there about 2 July. As he lay dying, Gerard was asked to take possession of a Holy relic which Robert had acquired in Jerusalem, reputedly a finger-bone of Saint Stephen, and to make a gift of it to the abbey or monastery of his choosing. Gerard returned to Normandy and became a monk at the Abbey of St. Wandrille taking the relic with him. He died after 1047.

== Family ==
While the name of his wife (or wives) is not known Gerard Flaitel had at least the following children:

- William Flaitel, Bishop of Évreux († 1066).
- Ermengarde, wife of Walter Giffard, Lord of Longueville.
- Basilla, wife of Ralph de Gacé, son of Robert, Archbishop of Rouen and secondly of Hugh de Gournay.
- Anscherius
