= Synod of Rouen =

The first synod of Rouen is generally believed to have been held by Archbishop Saint-Ouen about 650. Sixteen of its decrees, one against simony, the others on liturgical and canonical matters, are still extant.

Later synods were presided over by:

- Archbishop St. Ansbert some time between 689 and 693
- Archbishop Mauger in 1048
- the papal legate Hermanfrid of Sitten at Lisieux in 1055, at which Archbishop Mauger of Rouen was deposed for his loose morals
- Archbishop Maurilius in 1055, which drew up a creed against Berengarius of Tours to be subscribed to by all newly elected bishops
- Archbishop John of Bayeux, one in 1072 and two in 1074, urging ecclesiastical reforms
- Archbishop William in 1096, at which the decrees of the Council of Clermont (1095) were proclaimed
- Archbishop Goisfred in 1118, at which the papal legate Conrad asked the assembled prelates and princes to support Gelasius II against Emperor Henry V and his antipope, Burdinus (Gregory VIII)
- the same Archbishop in 1119, and the cardinal legate Matthew of Albano, in 1128, to enforce clerical celibacy
- Archbishop Gualterus in 1190, and the papal legate Robert de Courçon, in 1214 to urge clerical reform.

Other synods were held in 1223, 1231, 1278, 1313, 1321, 1335, 1342, 1445, and 1581. The synod held by Archbishop Jacques-Nicolas Colbert in 1699 condemned Fénelon's Maximes des Saints.

The last provincial synod was held by Archbishop Louis-Marie-Edmont Blanquart de Bailleul in 1830; for its Acts see Collectio Lacensis, IV, 513–36.
