= Ralph de Gacé =

Norman nobleman

Ralph of Gacé (French: Ralph de Gacé; died 1051) was a member of the House of Normandy who played an influential role during the minority of William the Bastard, prior to his conquest of England. Ralph was the lord of Gacé and other estates in Normandy.

== Name ==
Ralph was known to his contemporaries as "Ralph Asshead" or "the Ass-Headed" (Ralph Tête d'Âne) for the supposed resemblance of his large and shaggy head to an ill-kept donkey. His name is also recorded as Raoul.

== Life ==
Ralph was the middle son of Robert, Archbishop of Rouen and his wife Herlevea, making him part of the ducal house of Normandy in 11th-century France. He was the cousin of Robert I, duke of Normandy, and the first cousin once removed of Robert's son William the Bastard. Ralph's older brother Richard received the countship of Évreux, Ralph was given the lordship of Gacé in Lower Normandy. He also held Bavent, Noyon-sur-Andelle (now Charleval), Gravençon (near present-day Lillebonne), and Écouché.

Upon the death of Duke Robert in 1035 while returning from a pilgrimage to Jerusalem, Ralph's father Robert acted as the regent for the duke's young illegitimate son William. The archbishop was able to maintain order in Normandy until his own death in 1037, whereupon rebellions and private wars erupted.

Ralph was one of the rebellious lords. In 1040, assassins acting upon his orders murdered Gilbert, count of Brionne and the chief tutor of young duke William, while he was riding near Eschafour. In 1043, William and his advisors William of Talou and Archbishop Mauger enlisted Ralph's support and gave him command of the duchy's own forces. Ralph then campaigned against Thurstan le Goz who, along with the French king Henry I, had occupied Falaise. Ralph captured Falaise, forced Thurstan into exile, and drove Henry's forces from Normandy. While Ralph remained a key member of Duke William's inner circle, he made large donations to Jumièges Abbey. Ralph died in 1051.

== Family ==
Ralph married Basilla, daughter of Gerard Flaitel. They had a son, Robert de Gacé, who died without heirs. After Ralph's death, Basilla remarried, wedding Hugh de Gournay.

== Legacy ==
Ralph Asshead's former lands were among those demanded by his nephew William, count of Évreux, in exchange for consenting to the marriage of his virgin niece and ward Bertrade to the repeatedly divorced Fulk the Rude of Anjou. This being necessary to Robert Curthose's suppression of a revolt by the Manceaux, Robert yielded and restored almost all of the lands to the family. Bertrade subsequently left Fulk or was abducted and became the queen consort of Philip I.
