= Warner of Rouen =

Start of Moriuht

Warner of Rouen (French: Garnier de Rouen) was a Norman poet who wrote in Latin in the first quarter of the 11th century.

== Life ==
Nothing is known about Warner beyond what he relates about himself in his two surviving poems. He describes himself as a servant (famulus) of the Archbishop Robert II of Rouen (r. 989–1037), which suggests that he was either a canon of Rouen Cathedral or a monk of Saint-Ouen Abbey. He was educated in the classics, but the first direct evidence of a school at Rouen dates from 1028.

== Works ==
Warner's two poems are both found in a single 12th-century manuscript, now Paris, BnF lat. 8121A, at folios 3v–11v. They were both composed during the reign of Robert's brother, Richard II, Duke of Normandy (996–1026). One is the defence of an unnamed master (magister) from the slander of a monk of Mont-Saint-Michel. The slander is said to have been uttered in Saint-Ouen, suggesting that the master may be the abbot, either Hildebert (died 1006) or Henry (after 1006). In this poem, Warner shows familiarity with the Benedictine Rule. The master may even be Benedict of Nursia. Warner poses as his disciple (discipulus).

The other poem is a polemic against an immoral Irish poet named Moriuht. Untitled in the manuscript, it is conventionally known as Moriuht. Both are written in the form of epistles addressed to Archbishop Robert. Moriuht is also addressed to Robert's mother Gunnor and King Robert II of France. The poem tells how the grammarian Moriuht left Ireland in search of his abducted wife Glicerium. He is captured and raped by Vikings, who sell him to a Northumbrian nunnery. There he plans to impregnate every nun, and with his sons march and conquer Italy. Caught in flagrante, he is expelled. Captured once more by Vikings, he is sold into slavery in Saxony. On account of his ravenous sexual appetite for both men and women, he is driven out. By magic, he learns that his wife is a slave in Normandy. With money from an unnamed countess, he buys her and ransoms their child. He tries to make a living in Rouen as a poet, but his poetry is awful. Warner includes an example and critiques it, citing Statius, Virgil, Horace and Bede.

== Bibliography ==
- Bjork, Robert E., ed. (2010). "Warner (Garnier) of Rouen". The Oxford Dictionary of the Middle Ages. Oxford University Press.
- De Jong, F. P. C. (2016). "Rival Schoolmasters in Early Eleventh-century Rouen with Special Reference to the Poetry of Warner of Rouen (fl. 996–1027)". Anglo Norman Studies. 39: 45–64.
- McDonough, Christopher J., ed. (1995). Moriuht: A Norman Latin Poem from the Early Eleventh Century. Pontifical Institute of Mediaeval Studies.
