= Peasants' revolt of 996 in Normandy =

War in medieval Europe

The Norman peasants' revolt
- Date: 996
- Location: Normandy
- Caused by: Peasants wanted concessions on various economic grievances.
- Methods: Complaints sent to central assembly
- Status: Defeated
- Result: Peasants had their hands and feet cut off

The Norman peasants' revolt in 996 was a revolt against the Norman nobility. The revolt was ultimately defeated by the nobles under the early reign of Richard II, Duke of Normandy. His uncle Rodulf of Ivry was the regent of Normandy during the revolt.

The revolt was started in 996 after the peasants had met in local assemblies (conventicula) throughout Normandy. The revolt was coordinated by a central assembly (conventus) that was formed by members of the local assemblies. Each conventicula sent two representatives to the central assembly.

The peasants wanted concessions on various economic grievances. One reason in particular included local barons harassing the peasants with vexatious services. The main reason, however, was the removal of hunting rights for the lower classes; peasants were no longer able to hunt even a single deer. Medieval sources claim that the revolt was caused by demands of free hunting and fishing rights.

The revolt probably only affected the Seine valley rather than the whole of Normandy. Dating of the revolt in 996 has also been disputed.

The revolt may have been a reaction to the rise of serfdom in Normandy. It has been suggested that the revolt resulted in abolishing serfdom in Normandy. Lack of serfdom in Normandy has also been linked to the depopulation of coastal France brought by extensive warfare during the time period. However, evidence for existence and extent of serfdom has been difficult to obtain.

Peasant leaders who brought complaints to the regent Rodulf of Ivry had their hands and feet cut off, after they were captured. Others were blinded, impaled, or burnt alive, and small land owners were made to forfeit their land.

Despite the revolt at the start of his reign, the rest of the Richard II's rule was very peaceful. In May 1023 he did not implement the Peace of God, due to the calm situation in his lands. However, Norman culture retained more of its Frankish and Gallo-Roman characteristics and eventually lost its Scandinavian influences.

== See also ==
- List of peasant revolts
- Richard I of Normandy
- Roman de Rou that recounts the revolt
