= Robert II (archbishop of Rouen) =

Archbishop of Rouen from 989 to 1037

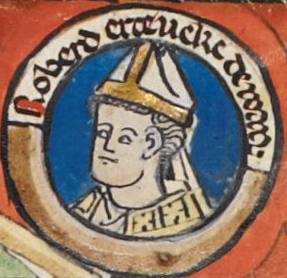
- Depiction of the priest Robert on the family tree

Archbishop of Rouen
- Tenure: 989–1037
- Predecessor: Hugh III
- Successor: Mauger

Count of Évreux
- Reign: c. 989–1037
- Predecessor: New creation
- Successor: Richard
- Born: bef. 989
- Died: 1037
- Spouse: Herlevea
- Issue: Richard, Count of Évreux; Ralph de Gacé; William d'Évreux
- House: House of Normandy
- Father: Richard I, Duke of Normandy
- Mother: Gunnor
- Religion: pre-schismatic Chalcedonian christendom

Robert II, Archbishop of Rouen (bef. 989–1037), (Note: At that point in time the marriage of a secular Bishop was recognized, if not the usual practice.) and Count of Évreux was a powerful and influential prelate, and a family member of and supporter of five dukes of Normandy.

== Life ==
Robert was a son of Duke Richard I of Normandy and his second wife, Gunnor. He was a younger brother of Duke Richard II and uncle of Duke Robert I.

Robert had been appointed archbishop of Rouen by his father c. 989–990 and had been given the county of Évreux at the same time. Robert was well aware he was destined for the church and seemingly accepted his role as both archbishop and count willingly. But he had always been involved in Norman politics and was a powerful adherent of the Norman dukes. Robert had proved himself a powerful ecclesiastical ally of his father, Richard I, as well as his brother, Richard II, and at the latter's death effectively became the senior male adviser to the ducal clan. But his nephew Richard III had a turbulent and short reign of just over a year and when replaced by his brother Robert I, as Duke of Normandy, the prelate Robert had a great deal of trouble restraining the new duke. In 1028 he found himself besieged and then banished by his young nephew. Duke Robert I then besieged Hugh d'Ivry, Bishop of Bayeux who, along with Archbishop Robert had apparently questioned his authority as duke. From exile in France, Archbishop Robert excommunicated his nephew Duke Robert and placed Normandy under an interdict.

The Archbishop and Duke finally came to terms and to facilitate the lifting of the interdict and excommunication, Duke Robert restored the archbishop to his see, to his countship of Evereux, and returned all his properties. To further illustrate his change of heart towards the church, Duke Robert restored property that he or his vassals had confiscated, and by 1034 had returned all church properties including those taken from Fécamp Abbey. By 1033 Duke Robert was mounting a major campaign against his double cousin Duke Alan III of Brittany. He and Alan had been raiding back and forth but finally a peace was negotiated between them by the returned Archbishop Robert, their mutual uncle.

In his last years Robert, realizing his past mistakes, began giving freely to the poor and undertook to rebuild the cathedral church at Rouen. In 1035 Duke Robert had decided on a pilgrimage to Jerusalem. After making his illegitimate son, the future William the Conqueror his heir and arranging for the archbishop to watch over and protect young William, Duke Robert set out on his pilgrimage never to return to Normandy. Archbishop Robert fulfilled his promise and effectively ruled Normandy as regent for William until Robert's death in 1037, which almost immediately caused an increase in lawlessness in Normandy. His title of Archbishop of Rouen was succeeded by his nephew, Mauger.

Orderic Vitalis relates of a psalter given to Archbishop Robert by his sister Queen Emma of England. (Note: Robert de Grentemesnil presented the monks of St. Evroult, as his mother’s gift, “the great psaltery illuminated with pictures,” which the choir frequently used as late as 1130 in chanting the praises of God. The psalter had been presented by Queen Emma to her brother Robert, archbishop of Rouen. William of Evreux, the son of the archbishop, was Hawise’s second husband. According to Orderic, William had ‘secretly abstracted” the book from his father’s chamber and given it to Hawise, to whom he was so much attached that he sought every means of affording her pleasure. The Evreux family retained close ties to the cathedral of Rouen, and may have also facilitated its transfer there after 1130.)

Robert was the recipient of two epistolary poems from Warner of Rouen, who describes himself as the bishop's "servant" (famulus).

== Family ==
Robert married Herlevea, and they had several children including the following:

- Richard, Count of Évreux (d. 1067)
- Ralph d'Évreux, Seigneur of Gacé. He married Basilla Flaitel, daughter of Gerard Flaitel. They had one son, Robert d'Évreux, who died without heirs.
- William d'Évreux, married Hawise de Échauffour, (Note: Judith Green indicates Hawise was previously married to Robert de Grandmesnil.) daughter of Giroie, Lord of Échauffour, (Note: George Garnett indicates Hawise was the daughter of Giroie and doesn't mention a surname.) and had a daughter, Judith d'Évreux, who married Roger I of Sicily.

== Sources ==
- Bates, David (2016). William the Conqueror. Yale University Press.
- Crouch, David (2007). The Normans; The History of a Dynasty. Hambledon Continuum.
- Douglas, David C. (1964). William the Conqueror. University of California Press.
- Fernie, Eric (2000). The Architecture of Norman England. Oxford University Press.
- Francis, Henry James (1923). "Hugh de Grentemesnil & His Family". Transactions of the Leicestershire Archaeological and Historical Society. 13: 155–198. doi:10.5284/1108021.
- Garnett, George (1994). "'Ducal' succession in early Normandy". In Garnett, George; Hudson, John (eds.). Law and Government in Medieval England and Normandy: Essays in Honour of Sir James Holt. Cambridge University Press. pp. 80–111.
- Green, Judith A. (2022). The Normans: Power, Conquest and Culture in 11th Century Europe. Yale University Press.
- van Houts, Elizabeth M.C., ed. (1992). The Gesta Normannorum Ducum of William of Jumièges, Orderic Vitalis, and Robert of Torigni. Vol. I. Clarendon Press.
- van Houts, Elisabeth, ed. (2000). The Normans in Europe. Manchester University Press.
- McDonough, Christopher J., ed. (1995). Moriuht: A Norman Latin Poem from the Early Eleventh Century. Pontifical Institute of Mediaeval Studies.
- Neveux, François (2008). The Normans. Translated by Curtis, Howard. Constable & Robinson, Ltd.

Preceded by Hugh III	Archbishop of Rouen (989–1037)	Succeeded by Mauger
Preceded by new cr.	Count of Évreux (c. 989–1037)	Succeeded by Richard
