= Walter Giffard, Lord of Longueville =

11th-century Anglo-Norman noble

Walter Gautier Giffard, Lord of Longueville, Normandy (also known as 'Giffard of Barbastre'), was a Norman baron, a Tenant-in-chief in England, a Christian knight who fought against the Saracens in Spain during the Reconquista and was one of the 15 or so known companions of William the Conqueror at the Battle of Hastings in 1066.

== Life ==
Walter (Note: This Walter has been confused with his son, Walter Giffard, 1st Earl of Buckingham. Orderic Vitalis (the eleventh century monastic chronicler) confused reports of father and son while Freeman, not realizing that the elder Walter had died in the lifetime of the Conqueror, assumed William Rufus had created the first Walter as earl of Buckingham when in fact it was his son Walter who became the first earl.) was the son of Osbern de Bolbec, Lord of Longueville by a sister of Gunnor, Duchess of Normandy. (Note: Several sisters of Gunnor are named by historical sources but these sources are in conflict regarding which of Gunnor's kin derived from which sister. Robert of Torigni identifies Walter's mother with Gunnor's sister Wevie, and though The Complete Peerage states the mother was instead Avelina without further explanation, more comprehensive studies of Gunnor's siblings accept Robert de Torigni's version.) As such he was first cousin twice removed of William the Conqueror. From the mid 1040s Walter's name appears among the loyal supporters of William the Conqueror. Walter was at the Battle of Mortemer and was among the Norman barons who surprised and defeated Counts Odo and Renaud leading the French contingent attacking Normandy from the east. In particular, he and another great vassal Robert of Eu encountered Odo's army encamped in the village of Mortemer with no sentries and the soldiers were drunk. The Normans attacked the French while they slept, most being either killed or taken prisoner, although Odo himself escaped. When King Henry I learned of the fate of his brother Odo's army he promptly withdrew his remaining forces and left Normandy. In 1054 Walter was in charge of maintaining the siege of Arques castle, against William of Talou, who had rebelled against the Conqueror.

Like many other Norman and French knights during the eleventh and early twelfth centuries, Walter served as a Christian knight in Spain (c. 1064–1065) against the Saracens. His epithet de Barbastre (Note: As examples of some of the pitfalls found in translations of earlier works, Walter Giffard’s epithet de Barbastre appears in a verse by Geoffrey Gaimar. The first of his English translators guessed that De Barbastre referred to Walter being a barber. Geoffrey's second translator thought de Barbastre was a reference somehow to Walter's cousin, William the Conqueror, being a bastard. In fact, 'Walter de Barbastre' was an honorific gained at the successful siege of Barbastro in Aragon, near Saragossa.) was earned when he took part in the Siege of Barbastro, an undertaking sanctioned by Pope Alexander II against the Moors in 1064, one of the more famous exploits of that time. By the time of the Conquest, Walter had returned to Normandy bearing a gift from a king in Spain for Duke William, a magnificent war-horse. The same Spanish war-horse duke William called for on the morning of the Battle of Hastings. The Spanish king in question was in all probability Sancho Ramírez of Aragon (1063–1094) who was known for making friends and recruiting knights and soldiers from Northern France. Walter went on pilgrimage to Santiago de Compostela, after the siege of Barbastro and before returning to Normandy.

In early January 1066, after Duke William received news of the crowning of Harold Godwinson as king of England, he called together a meeting, the Council of Lillebonne, that included six of his key magnates, Walter Giffard being one of them. After telling them of his plan to invade England and take the crown for himself they supported him fully but suggested he should call a meeting of all his vassals, which William did. In the preparation stage for the Battle of Hastings, Walter was one of the Norman magnates who provided ships for William's invasion fleet. In his case, he provided thirty. Walter was one of two who, having been offered the privilege of carrying William's standard in the battle, respectfully refused. Although by this time an older warrior with white hair, he wanted both hands free to fight. As a reward for his participation, Walter was granted the feudal barony of Long Crendon, comprising 107 manors, 48 of which were in Buckinghamshire, of which the caput was at Long Crendon, Buckinghamshire. The date of his death is not recorded, but his son Walter succeeded him before 1085.

== Family ==
Walter was married to Ermengarde, daughter of Gerard Flaitel. Walter and Ermengarde were the parents of:

- Walter Giffard, 1st Earl of Buckingham.
- William Giffard, Bishop of Winchester.
- Rohese Giffard (d. aft. 1113), married Richard fitz Gilbert, Lord of Clare.

== See also ==
- Newton Longville – Village in Buckinghamshire, England
