= William of Talou =

Norman nobleman

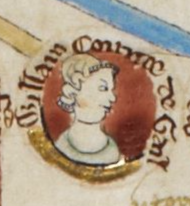
William in the genealogy of the kings of England

William of Talou, Count of Talou (Arques) (Note: He is titled in some sources as Count of Arques while others as Count of Talou.) (before 1035–1086) was a powerful member of the Norman ducal family who exerted his influence during the early reign of William the Conqueror Duke of Normandy.

== Background ==
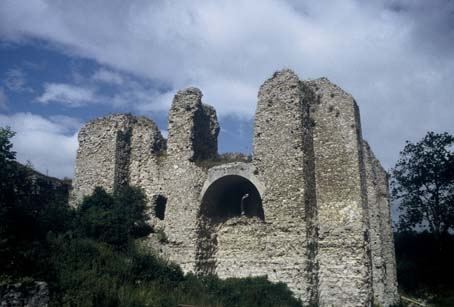
Castle of Arques built by William of Talou

William was born in ~1020 and was the son of duke Richard II of Normandy by Papia of Envermeu. His brother was Mauger, who became archbishop of Rouen in or shortly after 1037.

In 1035, following the death of Robert I of Normandy on a pilgrimage to Jerusalem, William of Talou challenged his nephew's right to succeed his father, basing his own claim on a legitimate descent from Richard II. But the young Duke William had the backing of his powerful great-uncle, Robert II, the archbishop of Rouen. When Archbishop Robert died in 1037 there was a power vacuum and all of Normandy fell into disorder. In an apparent attempt to help stabilize the situation Mauger was made archbishop in Robert's place; and his brother William was made count of Talou, but, according to William of Jumièges, he was to hold his countship as a benefice in return for his faithful service to the young Duke William.

== Rebellion ==
Archbishop Mauger and Count William occupied themselves with increasing their wealth and power in their new respective positions, independent of Duke William. But William of Talou continued to intrigue in plots against his young nephew, being careful his name did not come up in any of the revolts or conspiracies. But in 1049 at the battle of Domfront, Count William of Talou deserted his suzerain Duke William in the midst of the battle, and denouncing his oath of vassalage he returned to his castle at Arques and began organizing his own rebellion. Duke William repeatedly sent messengers summoning his uncle, Count William, to attend him and show his allegiance; but in his arrogance the Count of Talou scorned each of these and secured himself in his castle. The events that followed are as recalled by the Conqueror himself in his deathbed speech in 1087:

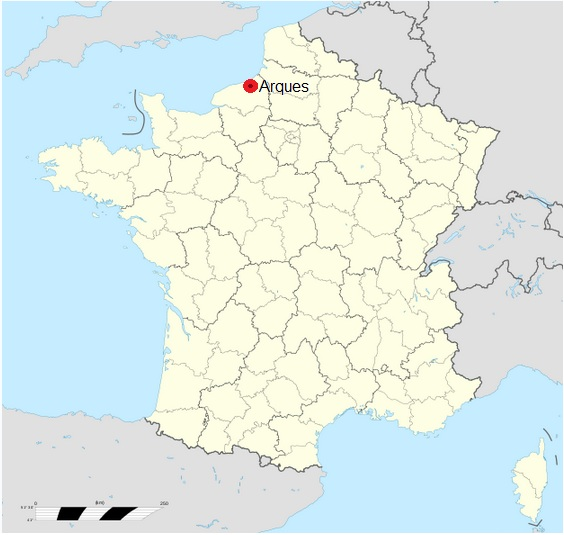
Map showing Arques in Upper Normandy

My uncles, Mauger, archbishop of Rouen, and his brother William, to whom I had gratuitously given Arques and the county of Talou, treated me with contempt as a bastard, and induced King Henry and Engelran, count of Penthieu, to take up arms against me. I received this intelligence in the Cotentin, and lost no time in beginning my march contrary to the opinions of most of my advisers. Sending forward to Arques some light troops who were eager for the fray, I followed myself with the main body, which was far from considerable, to lay siege to the castle. But before I reached the country between the two rivers, the Sie and Garenne, the advanced guard fell in with Count Engelran pushing forward to occupy the fortress, and killed him, fighting bravely, for he was a valiant knight, and routed his squadrons. Pressing the siege closely, I compelled the perjured count to go into banishment, and did not permit him to return to the domains he lost during all the days of his life. I also, by virtue of a papal decree, deposed the insolent archbishop, who neither observed his fealty to me, nor his duty to God, and raised to the see the venerable monk Maurilius who was providentially sent from Florence, an Italian city.

William of Talou's rebellion lasted from 1052 to 1054 at which time he was expelled from Normandy and fled to the court of Eustace II, Count of Boulogne. Both uncles, William of Talou and Mauger, despite being defeated and exiled were provided with generous incomes to live on by the Conqueror. William was the last Count of Talou. William of Talou died in 1086.

== Additional references ==
- The Gesta Normannorum Ducum of William of Jumièges, Orderic Vitalis, and Robert of Torigni, edited and translated by Elisabeth M. C. Van Houts, Clarendon Press, Oxford, 1995.
