= Papia of Envermeu =

11th-century Duchess of Normandy

Papia of Envermeu, also called Poppa of Envermeu, was the second consort of Richard II, Duke of Normandy.

Papia belonged to the local Norman aristocracy as the daughter of Richeldis of Envermeu. She married Richard II after the death of his first spouse, Judith of Brittany in 1017. She became the mother of Mauger, Archbishop of Rouen, and William of Talou. Papia is documented to have made a donation to the cathedral of Rouen together with her mother.

== Issue ==
- Mauger (c. 1019), Archbishop of Rouen
- William (c. 1020/5), count of Arques

== Sources ==
- Van Houts, Elisabeth (2013). The Normans in Europe. Manchester University Press.

Preceded by Judith of Brittany	Duchess consort of Normandy; 1024–1027	Succeeded by Adela of France
