= Poppa of Bayeux =

French mistress or wife of Viking conqueror Rollo

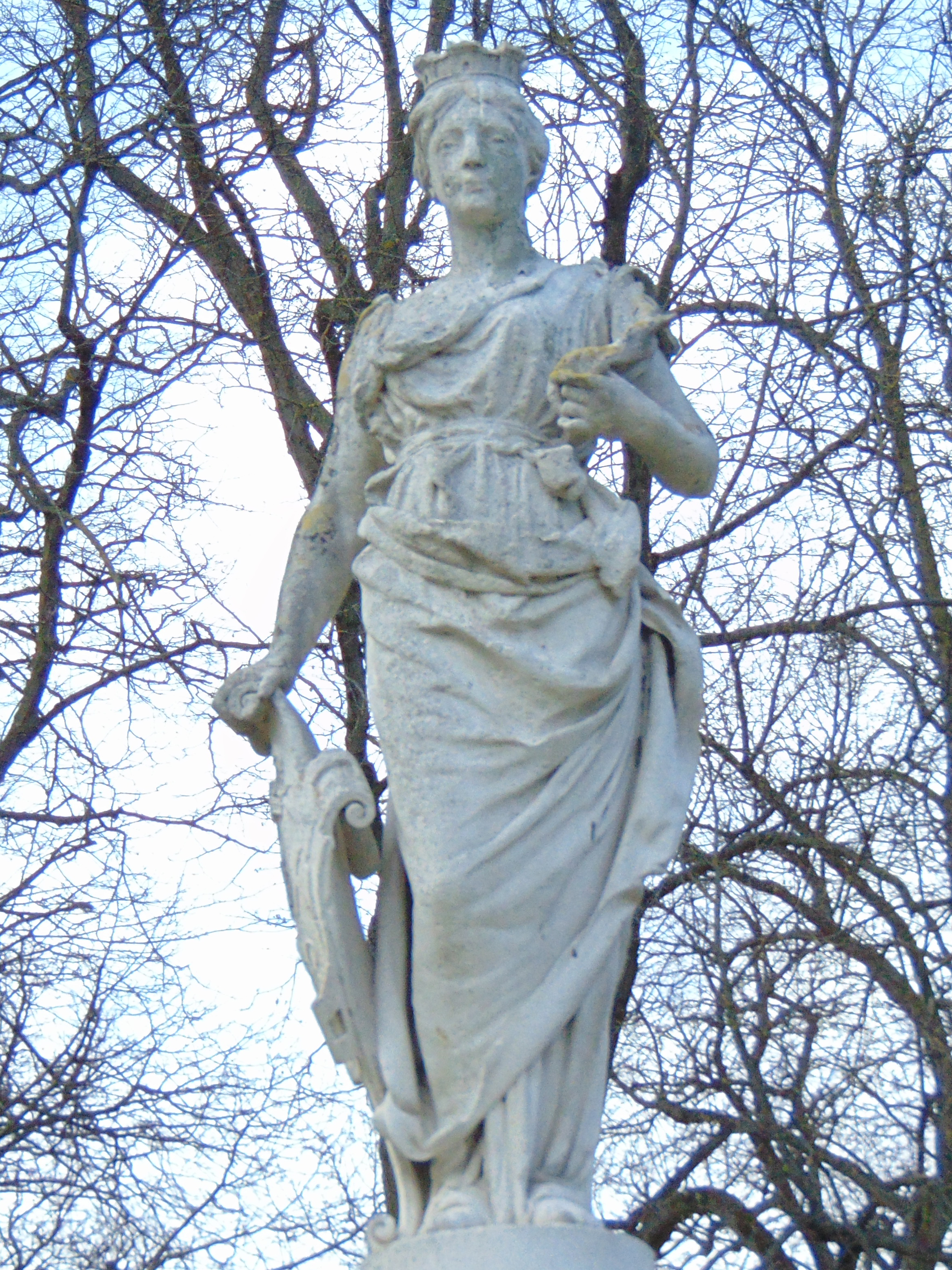
- Poppa of Bayeux's statue, Place de Gaulle, Bayeux
- Born: c. 880; Bayeux, West Francia
- Noble family: House of Normandy (by marriage)
- Spouse: Rollo (perhaps more danico)
- Issue: William I Longsword; Gerloc (baptismal name Adela)
- Father: Berengar II of Neustria or Guy de Senlis
- Mother: Adelind, Adela of Vermandois or Cunegundis

Poppa of Bayeux (French: [pɔpa d(ə) bɛjø]; born c. 880) was the wife more danico of the Viking leader Rollo. She was the mother of William I Longsword and Gerloc, and grandmother of Richard the Fearless, who forged the Duchy of Normandy into a great fief of medieval France. Dudo of Saint-Quentin, in his panegyric of the Norman dukes, describes her as the daughter of a "Count Berengar", the dominant prince of that region, who was captured at Bayeux by Rollo in 885 or 889, shortly after the siege of Paris. This has led to speculation that she was the daughter of Berengar II of Neustria.

There are different opinions among medieval genealogy experts about Poppa's family. Christian Settipani says her parents were Guy de Senlis and Cunegundis, the daughter of Pepin, Count of Vermandois, and sister of Herbert I, Count of Vermandois. Katherine Keats-Rohan states she was the daughter of Berengar II of Neustria by Adelind, whose father was Henry, Margrave of the Franks, or Adela of Vermandois. Her parentage is uncertain and may have been invented after the fact to legitimize her son's lineage, as many of the fantastic genealogical claims made by Dudo were. Based on her separate more danico status that differentiates her from Rollo's Christian wife Gisela of France, Poppa's family was unlikely to have been powerful Christian nobility who would have insisted—by force if necessary—on a legal and monogamous Christian marriage for their daughter. Poppa was likely a common woman taken from a country with which the Norse had trade contact.

A statue of Poppa stands at the Place de Gaulle in Bayeux.
