= Maurilius =

Norman Archbishop of Rouen from 1055 to 1067

Maurilius (c. 1000–1067) was a Norman Archbishop of Rouen from 1055 to 1067.

Maurilius was originally from Reims, and was born about 1000. He trained as a priest at Liege and became a member of the cathedral chapter of Halberstadt. He became a monk at Fecamp Abbey, but then became a hermit at Vallombrosa. From there he was elected abbot of the monastery of St Marry of Florence, but his austerity caused a revolt amongst the monks and he was forced to return to Fecamp.

Maurilius held the office of Archbishop of Rouen from 1054, when he first occurs in documents as archbishop. The Annals of Jumieges, however, place his elevation as archbishop in 1055. Maurilius succeeded Mauger, who was deposed by a council held in 1054 or 1055 at Lisieux under the guidance of a papal legate. After Mauger's deposition, Maurilius was appointed because of his support for church reform. Contemporaries praised his saintly character which gained him respect from his fellow clergy. He was also known for his scholarly interests and knowledge. He was a benefactor of the abbeys of Saint-Ouen, Jumièges, Le Tréport, and Saint-Ymer. Along with Lanfranc, he convinced the future St Anselm to take monastic vows in 1060. As archbishop, he built a large church to replace Rouen Cathedral. He also held at least one provincial synod - the 1063 Synod of Rouen, and perhaps held another ecclesiastical council sometime between 1055 and 1063.

The archbishop's last appearance in documents happens in 1067, and he died in the summer of 1067. His last public act was to consecrate the new abbey church at Jumièges on 1 July 1067 in the presence of Duke William, newly returned from his conquest of England in 1066. Two different dates are given for Maurilius' death, with a notice of his death appearing for 11 July at the monastery of Mont Saint-Michel but Jumièges Abbey recorded his death on 9 August. He was buried in Rouen Cathedral. After his death, the archbishopric was offered to Lanfranc, who refused the office.

== Sources ==
- "St Anselm", The Oxford Dictionary of the Christian Church, 3rd ed., Oxford: Oxford University Press, 2005, pp. 73–75, ISBN 978-0-19-280290-3.
- Douglas, David C. (1964). William the Conqueror: The Norman Impact Upon England. Berkeley, UK: University of California Press.
- Freeman, Edward A. (1875). The History of the Norman Conquest of England: Its Causes and Its Results. Vol. III (second ed.). Oxford: Clarendon Press. pp. 99–102.
- Spear, David S. (2006). The Personnel of the Norman Cathedrals during the Ducal Period, 911–1204. Fasti Ecclesiae Anglicanae. London: Institute of Historical Research. ISBN 1-871348-95-1.
