= Richard of Lincoln (son of Henry I) =

Illegitimate son of Henry I of England

- Born: 1101
- Died: 25 November, 1120 (aged 18–19) near Barfleur, Normandy
- House: House of Normandy
- Father: Henry I of England
- Mother: Ansfride

Richard of Lincoln (before 1101 – 25 November 1120) was the illegitimate son of Henry I of England.

Richard was born before 1101 to Henry and a woman named Ansfride, widow of Aanskill (origins unknown). She is often referred to as Henry’s third mistress. Richard was brought up and educated by Robert Bloet, the Bishop of Lincoln. Bloet had also educated Richard’s half-brother Robert, 1st Earl of Gloucester. Richard is sometimes confused with Richard de Lincoln, an Anglo-Norman prelate who died in 1203.

Richard supported his father in his war with Louis VI of France, although it is unclear at what point he joined the fight with the English forces. According to Orderic Vitalis, he avoided capture by French forces at Les Andelys in 1119 through the help of Ralph the Red of Pont-Echanfray.

Richard continued to fight at his father’s side during the siege of the castle of Évreux being held by Henry’s most detested enemy, Amaury III de Montfort. His last known military adventure was at the Battle of Brémule on 20 August 1119, for which the decisive win by the English led to Louis’ accepting Richard’s half-brother William Adelin as Duke of Normandy.

In 1120, Richard became betrothed to Amice, the daughter of the defender of Brémule, Raoul II de Gael, seigneur of Gael and Montfort, son of Ralph de Gael, Earl of East Anglia. The marriage never took place as Richard died in the wreck of the White Ship on 25 November 1120. Amice did not accompany him and lived until 1168, marrying the king's ward Robert de Beaumont, 2nd Earl of Leicester, and one of many descendants included Ida de Tosny, a mistress of Henry II Curtmantle, King of England.

== Sources ==
- Thompson, Kathleen, Affairs of State: the Illegitimate Children of Henry I, in Journal of Medieval History 29 (2), 2003, pg. 129–151
- Chibnall, Marjorie (translator), The Ecclesiastical History of Orderic Vitalis, 6 volumes (Oxford Medieval Texts), Oxford, 1968–1980
- Hollister, C. Warren, Frost, Amanda C., Henry I, Yale University Press, New Haven, 2003
- The Anglo-Saxon Chronicles, Translated by Anne Savage, Dorset Press, 1983
- Farrer, W., An Outline Itinerary of King Henry the First, Part II, The English Historical Review, Mandell Creighton, et al., Longman, 1919 (available on Google Books)
