= William I of Eu =

Illegitimate son of Richard I of Normandy

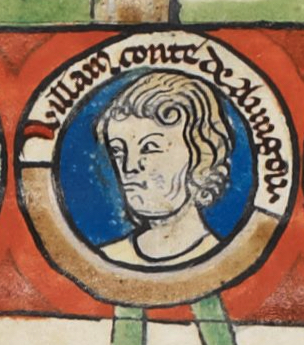
William of Eu

William I, Count of Eu (c. 978 – after 1057), illegitimate son of Richard I, Duke of Normandy, was Count of Eu and Count of Hiémois. William succeeded his nephew, Gilbert, as Count of Eu and Hiémois after his murder in 1040.

William rebelled against his half-brother Richard II, Duke of Normandy, and was captured by Raoul d’Ivry and imprisoned by Turquetil of Harcourt, former governor of William the Conqueror. He escaped five years later, and eventually was pardoned by Richard and given leave to marry into the Harcourt family.

William married Lesceline, daughter of Turquetil. William and Lesceline had three children:

- Robert of Eu (died between 1089 and 1093)
- William Busac, for a time Count of Eu, then Count of Soissons, de jure uxoris.
- Hugues d'Eu (died 17 July 1077), bishop-count of Lisieux from 1049 to 1077.

William's son, Robert, succeeded him as count of Eu.

== Sources ==
- Douglas, David (1946). "The Earliest Norman Counts". The English Historical Review. 61 (240). Oxford University Press: 129–156. doi:10.1093/ehr/LXI.CCLX.129. JSTOR 555396.
- Bauduin, Pierre, La première Normandie: Sur les frontières de la haute Normandie : Identité et Construction d'une Principauté, Caen, Presses universitaires de Caen, 2006.
