= Richard (son of William the Conqueror) =

11th-century son of William the Conqueror

Richard of Normandy
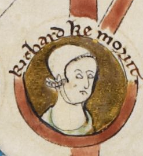
- Portrait of Richard in the Genealogical Chronicle of the English Kings (1275-1300)
- Born: c. 1054; Normandy, France
- Died: c. 1070 (aged 15 or 16); New Forest, England
- Burial: Winchester Cathedral
- House: Normandy
- Father: William the Conqueror
- Mother: Matilda of Flanders

Richard of Normandy (c. 1054 – c. 1070) was the second son of William the Conqueror, King of England, and Matilda of Flanders.

Richard died in a hunting accident in the New Forest in a collision with an overhanging branch, probably in 1070 or shortly afterwards. He was buried at Winchester Cathedral. His younger brother, King William Rufus, was also killed in the New Forest in 1100.

Richard is sometimes referred to as the "Duke of Bernay", as if part of his father's continental possessions, as in Burke's Peerage; this is a mistake based on the misinterpretation of a 16th-century inscription on his tomb, which was also intended for the Earl Beorn, nephew of Cnut the Great.
