= Nicolas of Normandy =

Anglo-Norman abbot (c. 1027–1092)

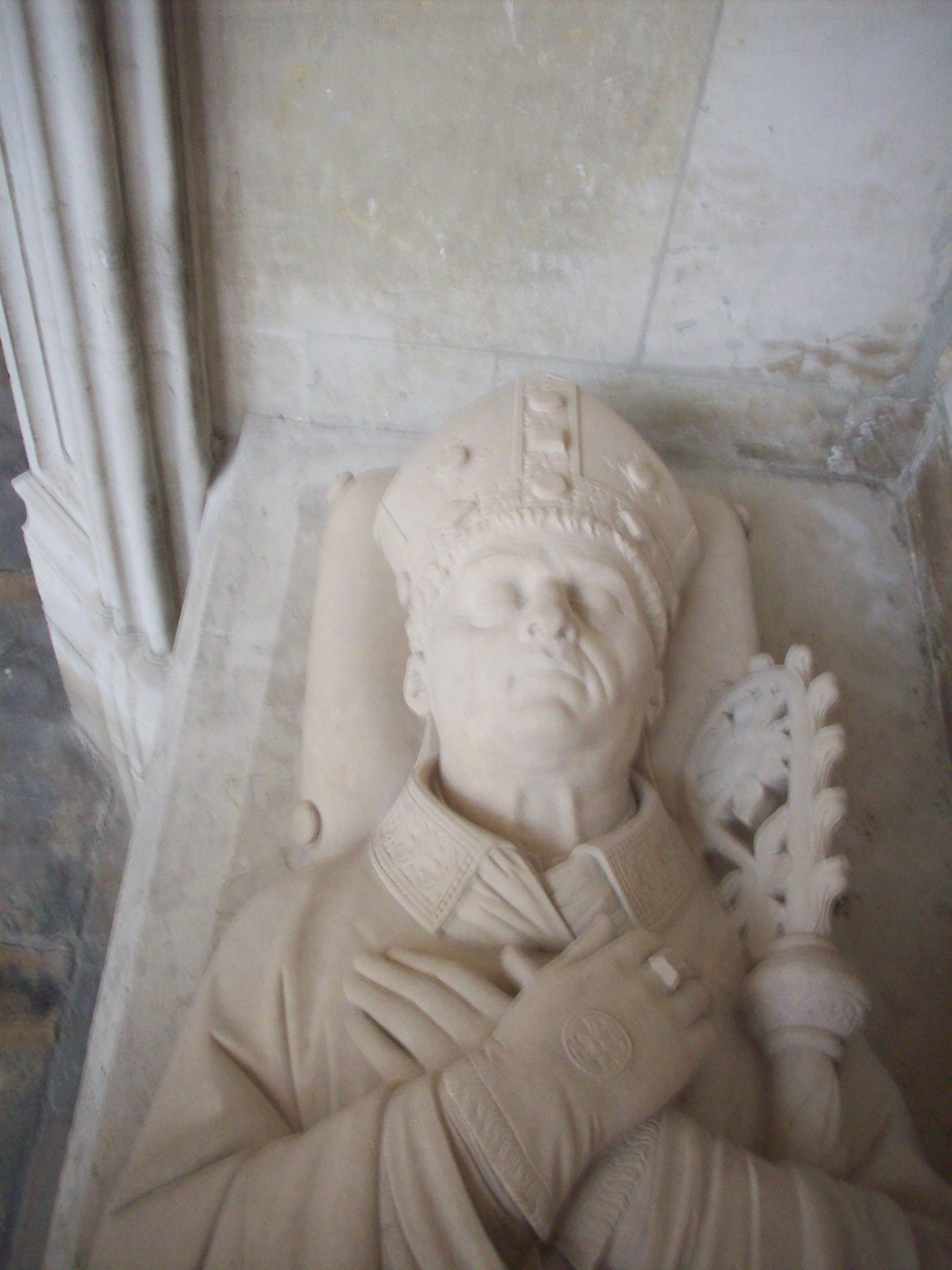
- Recumbent statue of Nicolas of Normandie in the chapel of the Virgin of the Saint-Ouen Abbey, Rouen.

Abbot of Saint-Ouen
- In office 1042–1092
- Preceded by: Herfast
- Succeeded by: Helgot

Personal details
- Born: 1026–1027
- Died: 1092 Nicaea, Asia Minor
- Occupation: Abbot

Nicolas of Normandy (or Nicholaus; c. 1027–1092) was the fourth abbot of Saint-Ouen Abbey, Rouen.

== Origins ==
Nicolas of Normandy was born in 1026–1027, the illegitimate or natural son of Richard III, Duke of Normandy. He is nicknamed Nicolas the Levite by Orderic Vitalis. The first names of the Norman princes are generally William, Robert and Richard. Véronique Gazeau suggests that the first name Nicolas is not the one given by his father, but one assigned to him by the abbot Isembert.

== Abbot ==
There is uncertainty about the date Nicolas became abbot. Orderic Vitalis says that he was chosen “in adolescentia” a few years after being sent as an oblate to Fécamp, appointed by his uncle Robert the Magnificent. It seems possible that his cousin William the Conqueror sought to establish his authority by appointing Nicolas abbot of Saint-Ouen and thus preventing factions which were hostile to him from claiming the duchy in Nicolas's name. Nicolas provided William with 15 ships and 100 soldiers for the conquest of England.

Starting in 1062 Abbot Nicolas of Normandy rebuilt the Carolingian church in Romanesque style, according to Orderic Vitalis. Dedicated to Saint-Pierre, it hosted his tomb in 1095. In 1090 he had acquired through the abbot Odon of Saint-Médard de Soissons the head of Saint Romain, the arm of Saint Godard, the relics of Saint Rémi, Saint Médard, the Saints Innocent and Saint Sérène. He also undertook the restoration of monastic buildings. The abbey church was dedicated after his death on 17 October 1126. It was burnt down in 1248. Today a two-storey apse of the Romanesque abbey called the Tower of the Clerics remains. According to excavations carried out in 1885, the dimensions of the Romanesque abbey are comparable to the Gothic one visible today. The choir followed the Benedictine plan. The nave had aisles and the transept was 54 metres (177 ft) wide.

Nicolas left at the end of 1091 for Jerusalem. He died during his return trip on 27 February 1092 in Nicaea. First buried in Nicaea, he was brought back and buried in front of the altar of the abbey's Church of Our Lady, in the middle of the choir, according to the Interpolations of Orderic Vital to William of Jumièges. Today one can see his recumbent statue, which was erected by Jean Roussel, destroyed and then recreated in 1869, on the north side of the axial chapel dedicated to the Virgin.

== Sources ==
- Deshoulières, François (1943), Au début de l'art roman : les églises de l'onzième siècle en France (in French), Paris: Les Éditions d'Art et d'Histoire
- Gazeau, Véronique (2007), Normannia monastica (xe – xiie siècle)–Princes normands et abbés bénédictins (in French), Preface by David Bates et Michel Parisse, Caen: Publications du CRAHM, p. 492, ISBN 978-2-902685-43-1
- Gazeau, Véronique (2007b), Normannia monastica (xe – xiie siècle)–Prosopographie des abbés bénédictins (in French), vol. II, Caen: Publications du CRAHM, p. 403, ISBN 978-2-902685-44-8
- van Houts, Elisabeth (1987), "The ship list of William the Conqueror", Anglo-Norman Studies, X
