= Geoffrey, Count of Eu =

Norman noble

Geoffrey de Brionne 1st Count of Eu 1st Count of Brionne

Hereditary
- Count of Eu: 996–1010
- Predecessor: None. First Creation
- Successor: Gilbert, Count of Brionne
- Died: c. 1010
- Buried: Duchy of Normandy
- Family: de Clare
- Issue: Gilbert, Count of Brionne
- Father: Richard I of Normandy
- Occupation: Norman Peerage

Geoffrey of Brionne (mid-10th century – c. 1010), also called Godfrey was Count of Eu and Brionne (Note: While there is little doubt Geoffrey (Godfrey) was Count of Eu, there is an open question as to whether Geoffrey was ever "Count" of Brionne.) in the late tenth and early eleventh centuries.

== Life ==
Geoffrey was a son of Duke Richard I of Normandy, by an unnamed wife or concubine. (Note: The early Normans followed the Viking custom of marriage called mos danicus that they considered a legitimate form of marriage. It was the Church that considered this the same as concubinage. Legitimacy would not have been an issue at this time.) The county of Eu was an appanage created for Geoffrey by his half-brother Richard II of Normandy in 996 as part of Richard's policy of granting honors and titles for cadet members of his family. The citadel of Eu played a critical part of the defense of Normandy; the castle and walled town were on the river Bresle, just two miles from the English Channel. It had long been an embarkation point for England, and in time of war was often one of the first places attacked.

The castle of Brionne had been held by the Dukes of Normandy as one of their own homes, but Richard II also made a gift of Brionne to his half-brother Geoffrey, (Note: Orderic in a speech attributed to Roger, Count of Mullent to Robert II, Duke of Normandy, in asking for the castle of Brionne stated that it was Duke Richard the elder (I) who gave Brionne to his son Geoffrey (Godfrey).) who held it for life, passing it to his son Gilbert, and was only returned to the demesne of the Duke after his murder.

Both Geoffrey and his son Gilbert are styled counts in a diploma to Lisieux given by Duke Richard II, but without territorial designations. Geoffrey died c. 1010.

== Issue ==
Geoffrey was married, but the name of his wife is unknown.

Geoffrey was the father of:

- Gilbert, Count of Eu and Brionne

Upon his death, Geoffrey was succeeded as Count of Eu and Count of Brionne by his son Gilbert.
