= Richard III of Normandy =

Duke of Normandy from 1026 to 1027

Richard III
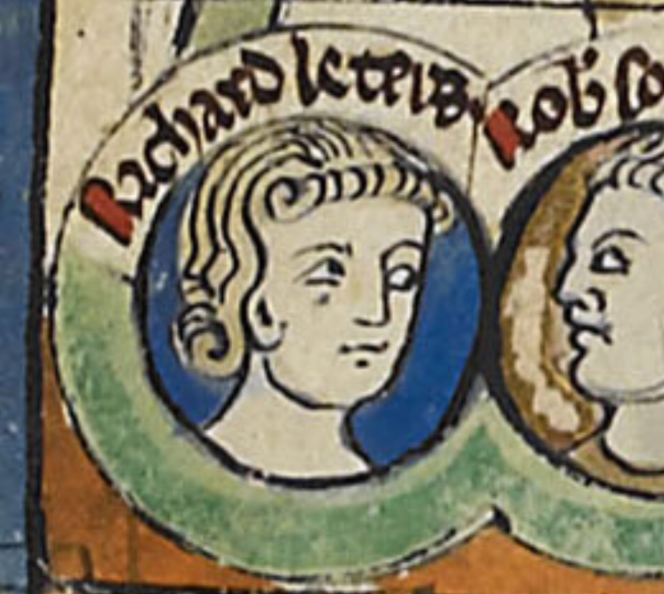

Duke of Normandy
- Reign: 28 August 1026 – 6 August 1027
- Predecessor: Richard II
- Successor: Robert I
- Born: 997/1001; Duchy of Normandy
- Died: 6 August 1027; Duchy of Normandy
- Issue: Illegitimate: Alice; Nicholas
- House: Normandy
- Father: Richard II, Duke of Normandy
- Mother: Judith of Brittany

Richard III (997/1001 – 6 August 1027) was the duke of Normandy who reigned from August 1026 to his death. His brief reign opened with a revolt by his brother.

== Life ==
Richard III was the eldest son of Richard II of Normandy and Judith of Brittany. Around 1026, Richard was sent by his father in command of a large army to rescue his brother-in-law, Reginald, later Count of Burgundy, by attacking bishop and count Hugh of Chalon, who had captured and imprisoned Reginald in Chalon-sur-Saône.

When Richard II died in August 1026, his eldest son, Richard III, became Duke of Normandy. Shortly after his reign began his brother Robert, discontented with his province of Hiemois on the border of Normandy, revolted against his brother. He laid siege to the town of Falaise, but was soon brought to heel by Richard who captured him, then released him on his oath of fealty. No sooner had Richard disbanded his army and returned to Rouen, when he died suddenly (some say suspiciously). The duchy passed to his younger brother Robert I.

== Marriage ==
In January 1027, he was married to Adèle, of a noble lineage. She is usually identified with Adela, a younger daughter of King Robert II of France, who married to Baldwin V, Count of Flanders after Richard's 6 August 1027 death.

== Issue ==
Richard's marriage to Adela was childless.

By an unknown woman, he had two children:

- Alice, who married Ranulph, Viscount of Bayeux
- Nicholas, monk at Fecamp, Abbot of Saint-Ouen Abbey, Rouen (died 26 Feb 1092)

French nobility
| Preceded by Richard II | Duke of Normandy; 1027 | Succeeded by Robert the Magnificent |
