= Fulk FitzRoy =

Illegitimate son of King Henry I of England

- Born: c. 1092
- Died: 1132 (aged 39–40)
- Parents: Henry I of England (father); Ansfride (possibly) (mother)

Fulk FitzRoy (c. 1092 – 1132) was an illegitimate son of Henry I of England. He was perhaps the son of Ansfride, one of Henry's mistresses. He may have been a monk at Abingdon Abbey. Little is known about him.
