= Richard II of Normandy =

Duke of Normandy from 996 to 1026

Richard II
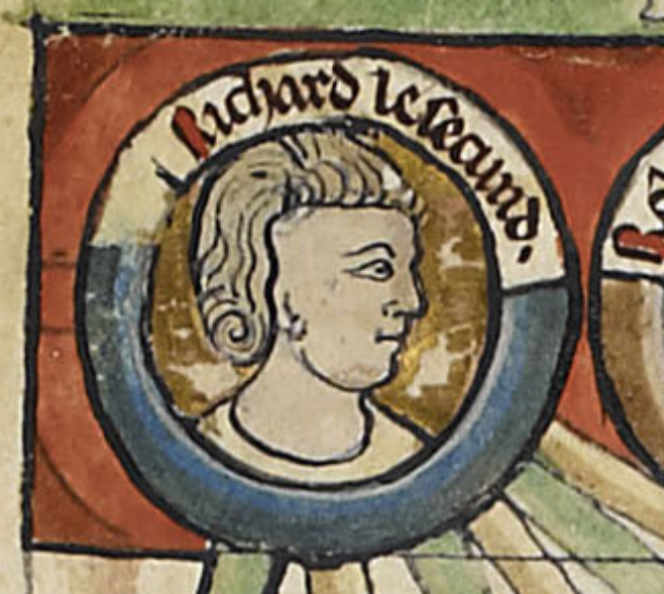

Duke of Normandy
- Reign: 996–1026
- Predecessor: Richard I (as Count of Rouen)
- Successor: Richard III
- Born: c. 980
- Died: 28 August 1026; Normandy
- Spouses: Judith of Brittany; Poppa of Envermeu (possibly)
- Issue more...: Richard III of Normandy; Alice of Normandy; Robert I of Normandy; Eleanor of Normandy; Mauger (archbishop of Rouen); William of Talou
- House: Normandy
- Father: Richard I, Duke of Normandy
- Mother: Gunnor

Richard II (c. 980 – 28 August 1026), called the Good (French: Le Bon), was the duke of Normandy from 996 until 1026.

== Life ==
Richard was the eldest surviving son and heir of Richard the Fearless and his wife, Gunnor de Crêpon. He succeeded his father as the ruler of Normandy in 996. During his minority, the first five years of his reign, his regent was Count Rodulf of Ivry, his uncle, who wielded the power and put down a peasant insurrection at the beginning of Richard's reign.

Richard had deep religious interests and found he had much in common with King Robert II of France, whom he helped militarily against the Duchy of Burgundy. He forged a marriage alliance with Duke Geoffrey I of Brittany by marrying his sister Hawise to him and by his own marriage to Geoffrey's sister Judith.

By 1000, Vikings had begun raiding England again, where they would subsequently cross the channel to Normandy and sell their plunder. Richard provided the Vikings with sanctuary and even welcomed them. This act violated a treaty signed between his father, Richard I, and King Æthelred II of England, in which he agreed not to aid enemies of England following similar events of assisting the Danes. As a result, Richard was forced to repel an English attack on the Cotentin Peninsula that was led by Æthelred. Æthelred had given orders that Richard be captured, bound, and brought to England. But the English were not prepared for the rapid response of the Norman cavalry and were utterly defeated.

Richard attempted to improve relations with England through the marriage of his sister Emma to Æthelred. This marriage was significant in that it later gave his grandson, William the Conqueror, the basis of his claim to the throne of England. Emma with her two sons, Edward and Alfred, fled to Normandy, followed shortly thereafter by her husband, King Æthelred. Soon after the death of Ethelred in 1016, Cnut the Great married Emma, forcing Richard to recognize the new regime as his sister was again queen.

Richard had contacts with Scandinavian Vikings throughout his reign, and he employed Viking mercenaries. Following the St Brice's Day Massacre ordered by Æthelred in 1013, King Sweyn Forkbeard of Denmark summoned an army to exact revenge on the English and sailed for England. He stopped in Rouen and was well received and treated courteously by Richard, who concluded an alliance with him.

Richard II carried on his father Richard's commission from his clerk and confessor, Dudo of Saint-Quentin, to compose a history of the dukes of Normandy. While Dudo had access to written records and to eye-witnesses, his history is more panegyric than chronicle: its narrative is of the pagan conversion to Christianity and the consequent legitimacy of rule of the dukes. As such, it is a careful mix of mendacity and veracity, and should not be read uncritically.

In 1025 and 1026, Richard confirmed gifts of his great-grandfather, Rollo, to the Saint-Ouen Abbey at Rouen. His other numerous grants to monastic houses tend to indicate the areas over which Richard had ducal control, namely Caen, the Éverecin, the Cotentin, the Pays de Caux, and Rouen.

Richard II died in 1026. His eldest son, Richard III, became the new duke.

== Marriages and children ==
Richard married firstly, c. 1000, Judith (982–1017), daughter of Conan I of Brittany, by whom he had the following issue:

- Richard III (c. 1002-04), duke of Normandy
- Alice (c. 1003-05), married to Count Reginald I of Burgundy
- Robert I (c. 1005-07), duke of Normandy
- William (c. 1007-09), monk at Fécamp, d. 1025, buried at Fécamp Abbey
- Eleanor (c. 1011-13), married to Count Baldwin IV of Flanders
- Matilda (c. 1013-05), nun at Fécamp, d. 1033.

With his second wife, Poppa of Envermeu, Richard had the following issue:

- Mauger (c. 1019), archbishop of Rouen
- William (c. 1020-25), count of Arques

== Sources ==
- Crouch, David (2007). The Normans: The History of a Dynasty. Hambledon Continuum.
- Douglas, David C. (1964). William The Conqueror. University of California Press.
- Neveux, François (2008). A Brief History of The Normans. Constable and Robinson.
- Potts, Cassandra (1997). Monastic Revival and Regional Identity in Early Normandy. The Boydell Press.
- Searle, Eleanor (1988). Predatory Kinship and the Creation of Norman Power, 840–1066. University of California Press.
- Van Houts, Elizabeth M.C., ed. (1992a). The Gesta Normannorum Ducum of William of Jumièges, Orderic Vitalis, and Robert of Torigni. Vol. I. Clarendon Press.
- Van Houts, E., ed. (1992b). The Gesta Normannorum Ducum of William of Jumièges, Orderic Vitalis and Robert of Torigni. Vol. 2. Clarendon Press.
- Van Houts, Elisabeth, ed. (2000). The Normans in Europe. Manchester University Press.

French nobility
Preceded by Richard I	Duke of Normandy; 996–1026	Succeeded by Richard III
