= Robert I of Normandy =

Duke of Normandy from 1027 to 1035

Robert I
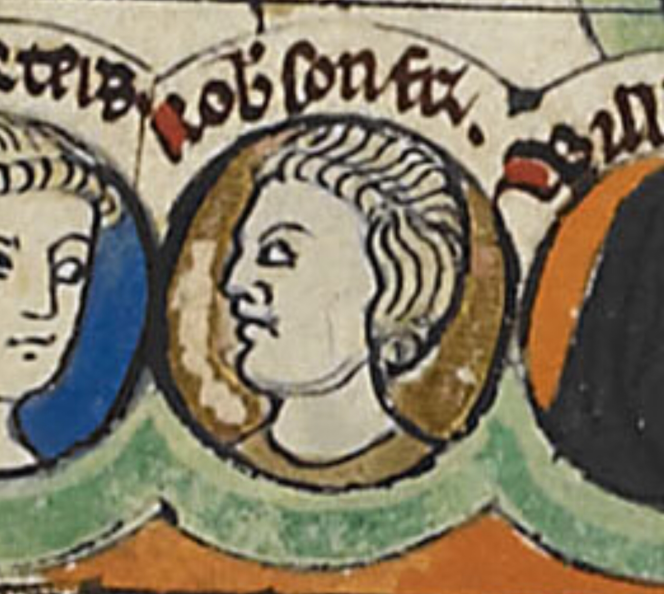

Duke of Normandy
- Reign: 1027–1035
- Predecessor: Richard III
- Successor: William II (the Conqueror)
- Born: 22 June 1000; Duchy of Normandy
- Died: 1, 2, or 3 July 1035 (aged 35); Nicaea
- Partner: Herleva
- Issue: William the Conqueror; Adelaide of Normandy
- House: Normandy
- Father: Richard II, Duke of Normandy
- Mother: Judith of Brittany

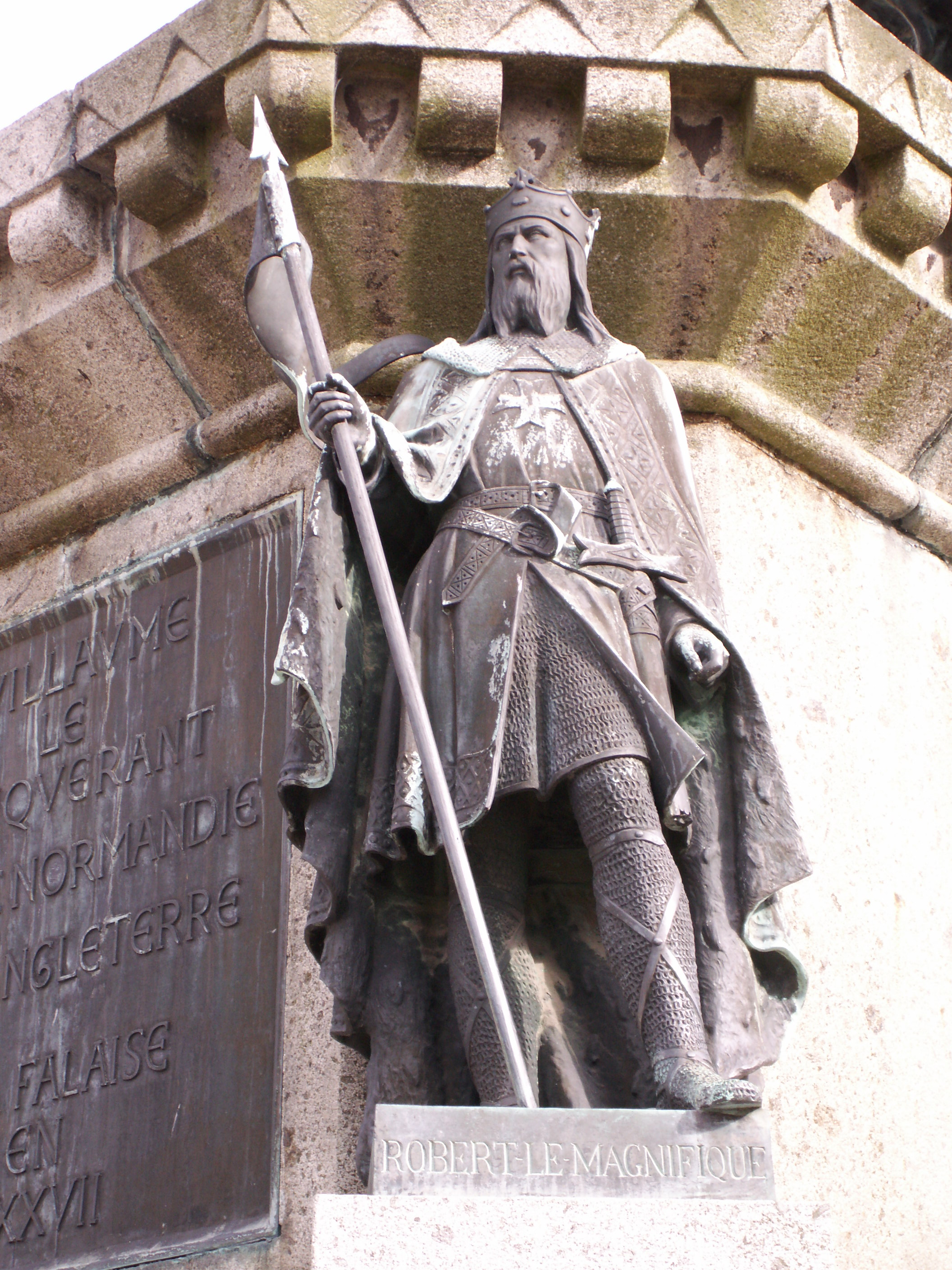
Statue of Robert in Falaise.

Robert I (22 June 1000 – 2 July 1035), also known as Robert the Magnificent and by other names, was a Norman noble of the House of Normandy who ruled as duke of Normandy from 1027 until his death in 1035. He was the son of Duke Richard II; the brother of Duke Richard III, against whom he unsuccessfully revolted; and the father of Duke William who became the first Norman king of England after winning the Battle of Hastings in 1066. During his reign, Robert quarrelled with the church—including his uncle Robert, archbishop of Rouen—and meddled in the disorder in Flanders. He was finally reconciled with his uncle and the church, restoring some property and undertaking a pilgrimage to Jerusalem, during which he died.

== Name ==
Robert is generally enumerated as Robert I of Normandy (French: Robert I^{er} de Normandie), although he is sometimes considered Robert II with his ancestor Rollo listed as Robert I. He is also known as Robert the Generous (Robert le Libéral), Robert the Magnificent (Robert le Magnifique), and Robert the Devil (Robert le Diable). The last is sometimes reckoned a misnomer, as he is not called Robert the Devil in surviving contemporary accounts and the name seems to have been a conflation of the historical figure with a separate fictional one during the late Middle Ages.

== Life ==
Family tree

=== Early life ===
Robert was the son of Richard II of Normandy and Judith, daughter of Conan I, Duke of Brittany, and Ermengarde-Gerberga of Anjou. He was also grandson of Richard I of Normandy, great-grandson of William I of Normandy and great-great grandson of Rollo, the Viking who founded Normandy. Before he died, Richard II had decided his elder son Richard III would succeed him while his second son Robert would become Count of Hiémois. In August 1026, their father Richard II died and Richard III became duke, but soon afterwards Robert rebelled against him, and was subsequently defeated and forced to swear fealty to Richard.

=== Reign ===
When Richard III died a year later, there were suspicions that Robert had something to do with his death. Although nothing could be proven, Robert had the most to gain. The civil war Robert I had brought against his brother Richard III was still causing instability in the duchy. Private wars raged between neighbouring barons, which resulted in a new aristocracy arising in Normandy during Robert's reign.

It was also during this time that many of the lesser nobility left Normandy to seek their fortunes in southern Italy and elsewhere. Soon after assuming the duchy, possibly in revenge for supporting his brother against him, Robert I assembled an army against his uncle, Robert, Archbishop of Rouen and Count of Évreux. A temporary truce allowed his uncle to leave Normandy, and live in exile at the Capetian court.

Robert also attacked another powerful churchman, his cousin Hugo III d'Ivry, Bishop of Bayeux, banishing him from Normandy for an extended period. Robert also seized a number of church properties belonging to the Abbey of Fecamp.

Despite his domestic troubles, Robert decided to intervene in the civil war in Flanders between Baldwin V, Count of Flanders and his father Baldwin IV, whom the younger Baldwin had driven out of Flanders. Baldwin V, supported by king Robert II of France, his father-in-law, was persuaded to make peace with his father in 1030 when Duke Robert promised the elder Baldwin his considerable military support. Robert gave shelter to Henry I of France against his mother, Queen Constance, who favoured her younger son Robert to succeed to the French throne after his father Robert II. For his help Henry I rewarded Robert with the French Vexin.

In the early 1030s, Alan III, Duke of Brittany began expanding his influence from the area of Rennes and appeared to have designs on the area surrounding Mont Saint-Michel. After sacking Dol and repelling Alan's attempts to raid Avranches, Robert mounted a major campaign against his cousin Alan III. However, Alan appealed to their uncle, Archbishop Robert of Rouen, who then brokered a peace between Duke Robert and his vassal Alan III. His cousins, the Athelings Edward and Alfred, sons of his aunt Emma of Normandy and Athelred, King of England, had been living at the Norman Court and at one point Robert, on their behalf, attempted to mount an invasion of England but was prevented in doing so, it was said, by unfavourable winds, that scattered and sank much of the fleet. Robert made a safe landing in Guernsey. Gesta Normannorum Ducum stated that King Cnut sent envoys to Duke Robert offering to settle half the Kingdom of England on Edward and Alfred. After postponing the naval invasion, he chose to also postpone the decision until after he returned from Jerusalem.

=== Pilgrimage and death ===
Robert's attitude towards the Church had changed noticeably certainly since reinstating his uncle's position as Archbishop of Rouen. In his attempt to reconcile his differences with the Church, he restored property that he or his vassals had confiscated, and by 1034 had returned all the properties he had earlier taken from the abbey of Fecamp.

After making his son William his heir, he set out on pilgrimage to Jerusalem. According to the Gesta Normannorum Ducum he travelled by way of Constantinople, reached Jerusalem, fell seriously ill and died (Note: It was reported by William of Malmesbury (Gesta regum Anglorum, Vol. i, pp. 211–12) and Wace (pt. iii, II, 3212–14) that Robert died of poisoning. William of Malmsebury pointed to a Ralph Mowin as the instigator. See: The Gesta Normannorum Ducum of William of Jumièges, Orderic Vitalis, and Robert of Torigni, Ed. & Trans. Elizabeth M.C. Van Houts, Vol. I (Clarendon Press, Oxford, 1992), pp. 84–5, n. 2. However, it was common in Normandy during the eleventh century to attribute any sudden and unexplained death to poisoning. See: David C. Douglas, William the Conqueror (University of California Press, Berkeley and Los Angeles, 1964), p. 411) on the return journey at Nicaea on 2 July 1035. His son William, aged about eight, succeeded him.

According to the historian William of Malmesbury, decades later his son William sent a mission to Constantinople and Nicaea, charging it with bringing his father's body back to Normandy for burial. Permission was granted but, having travelled as far as Apulia (Italy) on the return journey, the envoys learned that William himself had meanwhile died. They then decided to re-inter Robert's body in Italy.

== Family ==
By his mistress or concubine, Herleva of Falaise, he was father of:

- William the Conqueror (c. 1028–1087).

By Herleva or possibly another concubine, (Note: The question of who her mother was seems to remain unsettled. Elisabeth Van Houts ['Les femmes dans l'histoire du duché de Normandie', Tabularia « Études », n° 2, 2002, (10 July 2002), p. 23, n. 22] makes the argument that Robert of Torigny in the GND II, p. 272 (one of three mentions in this volume of her being William's sister) calls her in this instance William's 'uterine' sister' (soror uterina) and is of the opinion this is a mistake similar to one he made regarding Richard II, Duke of Normandy and his paternal half-brother William, Count of Eu (calling them 'uterine' brothers). Based on this she concludes Adelaide was a daughter of Duke Robert by a different concubine. Kathleen Thompson ["Being the Ducal Sister: The Role of Adelaide of Aumale", Normandy and Its Neighbors, Brepols, (2011) p. 63] cites the same passage in GND as did Elisabeth Van Houts, specifically GND II, 270–2, but gives a different opinion. She noted that Robert de Torigni stated here she was the uterine sister of Duke William "so we might perhaps conclude that she shared both mother and father with the Conqueror." But as Torigni wrote a century after Adelaide's birth and in that same sentence in the GND made a genealogical error, she concludes that the identity of Adelaide's mother remains an open question.) he was the father of:

- Adelaide of Normandy, who married firstly, Enguerrand II, Count of Ponthieu. She married secondly, Lambert II, Count of Lens, and thirdly, Odo II of Champagne.

== Notes ==
French nobility
Preceded by Richard III	Duke of Normandy; 1027–1035	Succeeded by William II
