= Mersea Island =

Tidal island in Essex, England

Coordinates: 51.79570°N 0.94°E

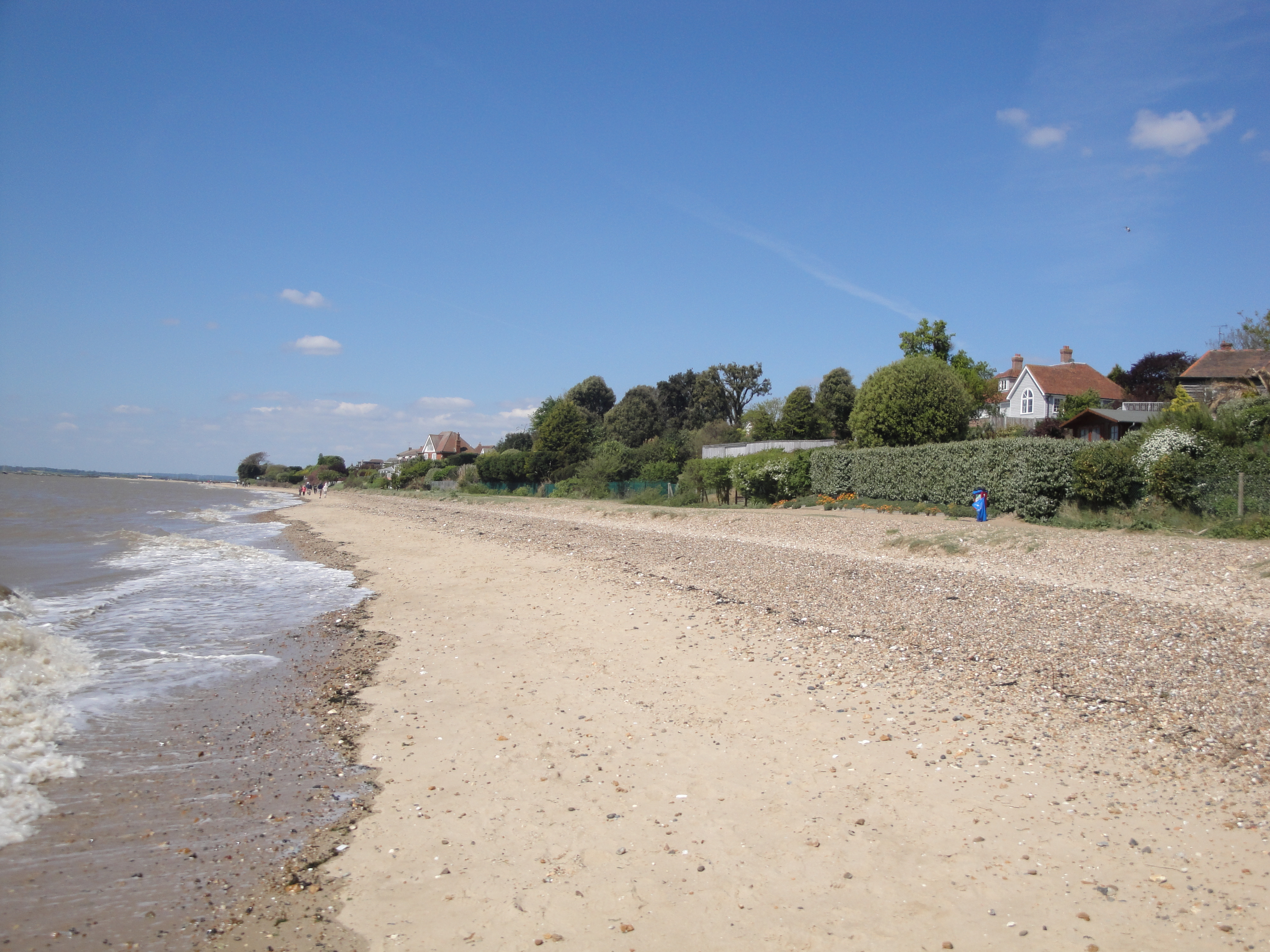
- West Mersea beach

- Location within Essex
- Population: 6,925
- OS grid reference: TM060150
- Civil parish: East Mersea West Mersea
- District: City of Colchester
- Shire county: Essex
- Region: East
- Country: England
- Sovereign state: United Kingdom
- Post town: Colchester
- Postcode district: CO5
- Dialling code: 01206
- Police: Essex
- Fire: Essex
- Ambulance: East of England
- UK Parliament: Harwich and North Essex

Mersea Island /ˈmɜːrzi/ is a tidal island in Essex, England, in the Blackwater and Colne estuaries to the south of Colchester. Its name comes from the Old English word meresig, meaning "island of the pool" and thus is tautological. The island is split into two main areas, West Mersea and East Mersea, and connected to the mainland by the Strood, a causeway that can flood at high tide.

The island has been inhabited since pre-Roman times. It was used as a holiday destination in Roman Britain for occupants of Camulodunum (Colchester). Fishing has been a key industry on the island since then, particularly oysters, and along with tourism makes up a significant part of the island's economy. The Church of St Peter & St Paul in West Mersea is thought to have existed since the 7th century, while the Church of St Edmund in East Mersea dates from around the 12th or 13th century. The island became popular with smugglers from the 16th to the 19th century. It became a focal point for troops in both world wars, and a number of observation posts can still be found on the island. Tourism remains popular, and there are a number of beach huts and holiday parks on the island. A week-long festival of boat racing, Mersea Week, takes place every summer.

== Geography ==
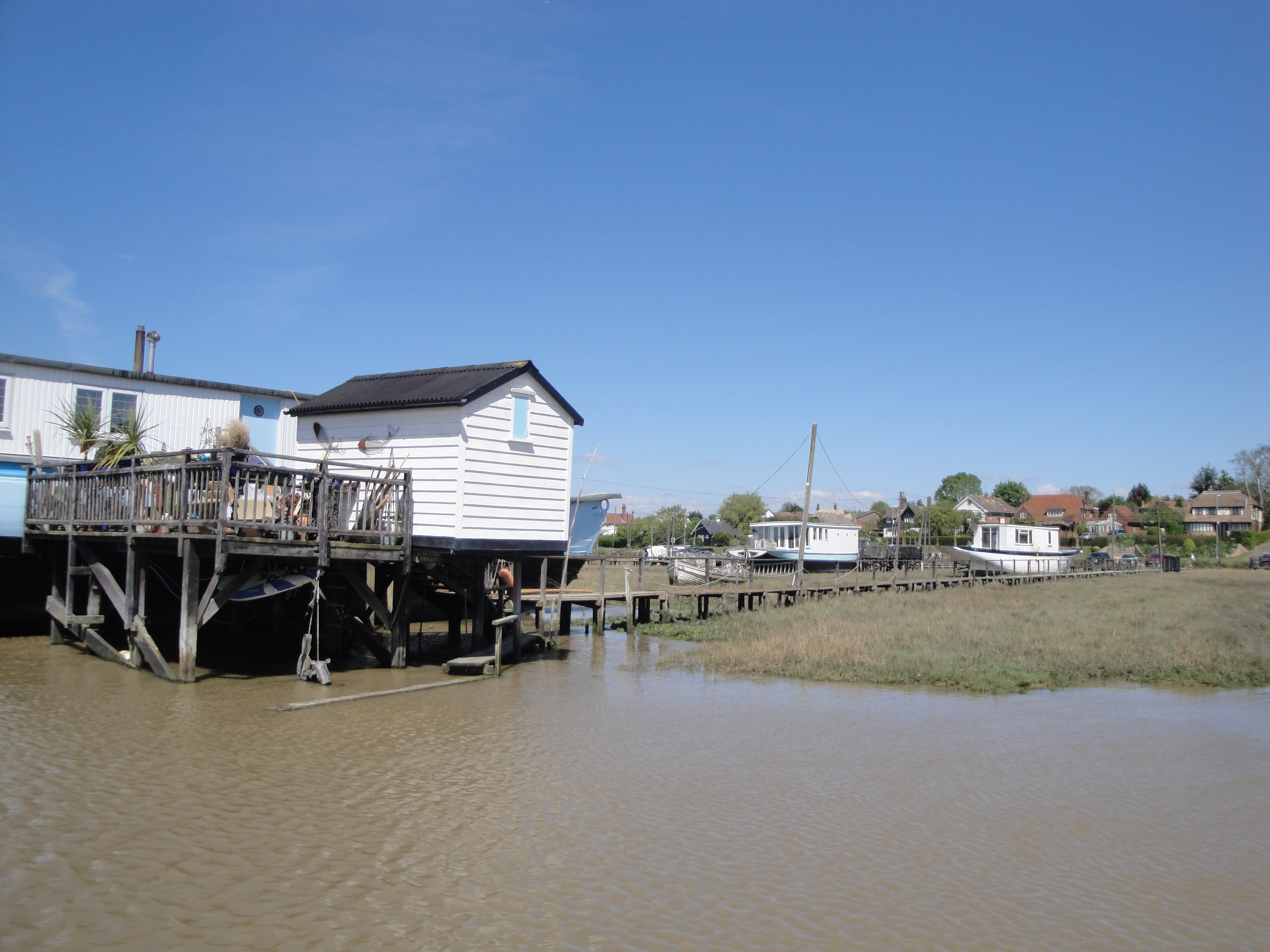
Mudflats by West Mersea Harbour

The island lies 9 miles (14 km) south of Colchester and 26 miles (42 km) east of the county town, Chelmsford. It is the most easterly inhabited and publicly accessible island in the United Kingdom (Note: The sparser Horsey Island is further east in Essex, but is limited to a few farm buildings and is only accessible by boat or private road. Cobholm Island in Norfolk is a former island close to the North Sea.) and is one of 43 (unbridged) tidal islands which can be accessed on foot or by road from the British mainland. It is situated in the estuary area of the Blackwater and Colne rivers and has an area of around 7 square miles (18 km^{2}). It is formed by the Pyefleet Channel to the north and the Strood Channel to the west, which connect the Blackwater to the Colne. The much smaller Ray Island lies adjacent to the north while the uninhabited Packing Marsh and Cobmarsh Islands lie to southwest. Most of the area immediately surrounding the island consists of saltmarsh and mudflats, and is an important sanctuary for wading and migratory birds. The island itself sits on a mix of London Clay, chalky boulder clay, sand and gravel.

Internally, the island is split between West Mersea, which is the main inhabited area containing the jetty and marina, and East Mersea, which is predominantly farmland and includes Cudmore Grove County Park to the east. There is also a small hamlet at Barrow Hill to the north of West Mersea. The land immediately facing the Blackwater is known as the Mersea flats, which is mostly beach that dries at low tide. The former Bradwell Power Station can be seen on the other side. West Mersea can be further divided into three areas. The Old City in the southwest of West Mersea serves the fishing and yachting industries and contains a number of listed buildings. The centre contains the church of St Peter & St Paul, while the beach and esplanade are to the south.

The name 'Mersea' is derived from the Old English word meresig meaning 'island of the pool'. It is mentioned in the Domesday Book as Meresai. The Strood is derived from strod, meaning 'marshy land'.

== Economy ==
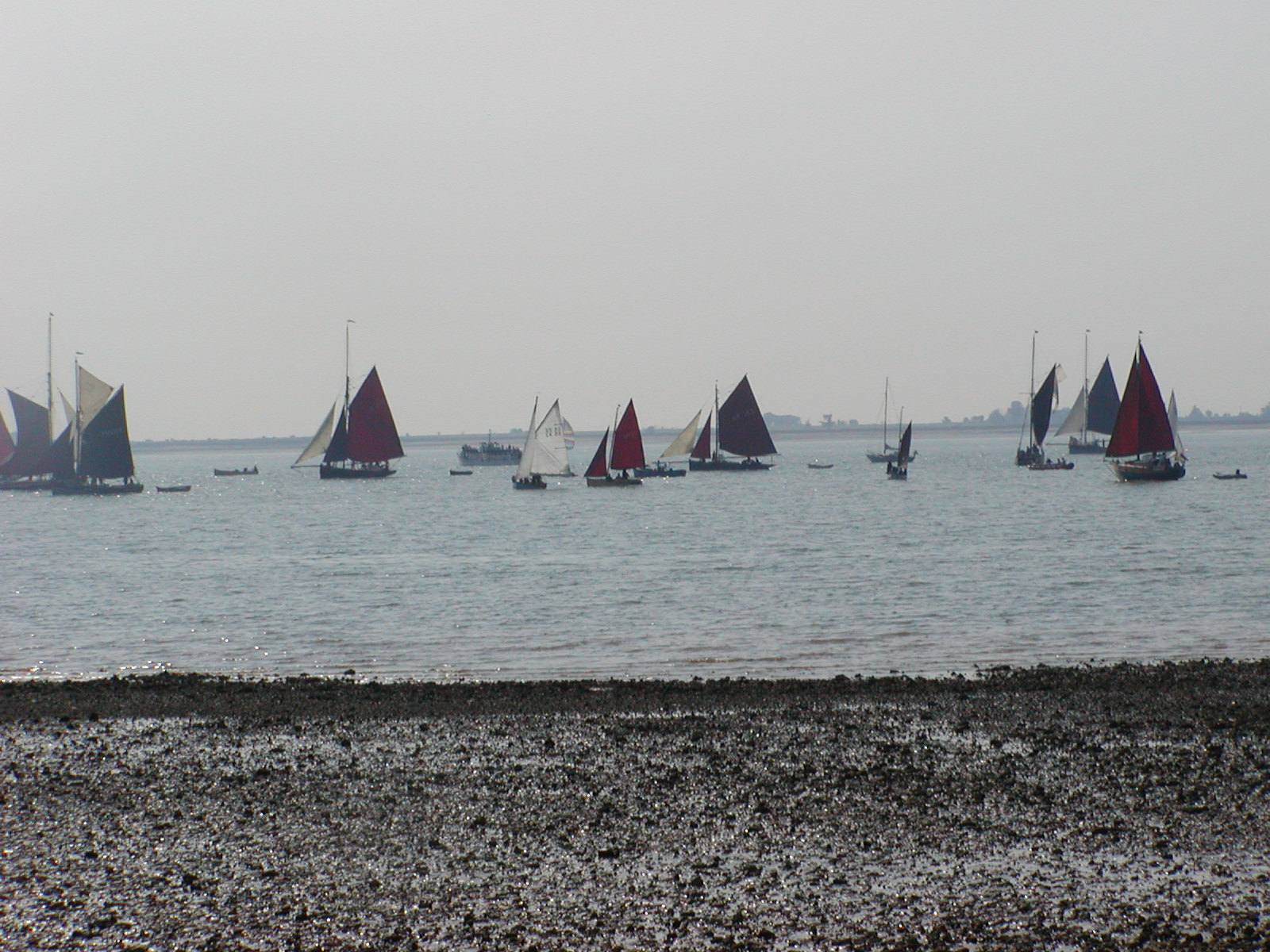
A group of fishing smacks off West Mersea

The main industries on Mersea are farming, fishing and servicing the leisure boating and yachting industry. Oysters have been harvested off the island since Roman times, and are shipped worldwide. The extensive history and association with the oyster trade attracts a significant number of tourists each year, though today the trade is predominantly with Pacific oysters that have been introduced to the area. The Essex oyster fishery is opened by the Mayor of Colchester every September.

Many small shops and ice cream businesses serve the tourism on Mersea's seafront. The Two Sugars Cafe is sited on a former World War II pillbox near the beach.

There are six camping and caravanning sites on the island, which help contribute towards the island's economy during the summer months. The largest is Cooper's Beach, which caters to 3,000 residents.

== History ==
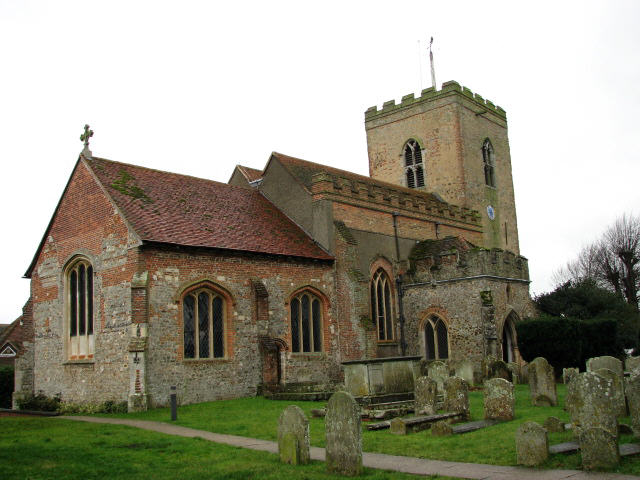
The Church of St Peter & St Paul in West Mersea is believed to have been founded around the 7th century.

There is evidence of pre-Roman settlement on Mersea in the form of "red hills" that are the remains of Celtic salt workings. A large Romano-British round barrow near the Strood contained the remains of a cremated adult in a glass urn, within a lead casket, now in the local Mersea Museum. In 1730, a large mosaic floor was found underneath the Church of St Peter & St Paul at West Mersea and in 1764, Richard Gough discovered further evidence of Roman remains around the church. West Mersea was believed to be a holiday destination for Romans staying at Camulodunum (Colchester).

Evidence has shown a number of fish traps exist around the island, which date from around the 7th century. The Anglo-Saxons established a large fish weir at Besom Fleet to the southwest of the island and built the church at West Mersea. It was damaged by Norse raiders in 894 and rebuilt afterwards. The west tower was added to the church around the 11th century, the south aisle in the 15th and various other rebuilds continued towards the end of the 18th century.

The Strood causeway was also built by the Saxons; oak piles discovered in 1978 have been dated to between 684 and 702 using dendrochronology. By 950, there was a Benedictine priory at West Mersea and land here was granted to the Abbey of St Ouen in France by Edward the Confessor in 1046. The priory survived until the dissolution of the monasteries in 1542.

The Parish Church of St Edmund in East Mersea dates from around the 12th or 13th century, with extensions in the late 15th or 16th. The church and hall are surrounded by a moat that is thought to be the remains of a Danish refuge after their defeat by King Alfred at Farnham.

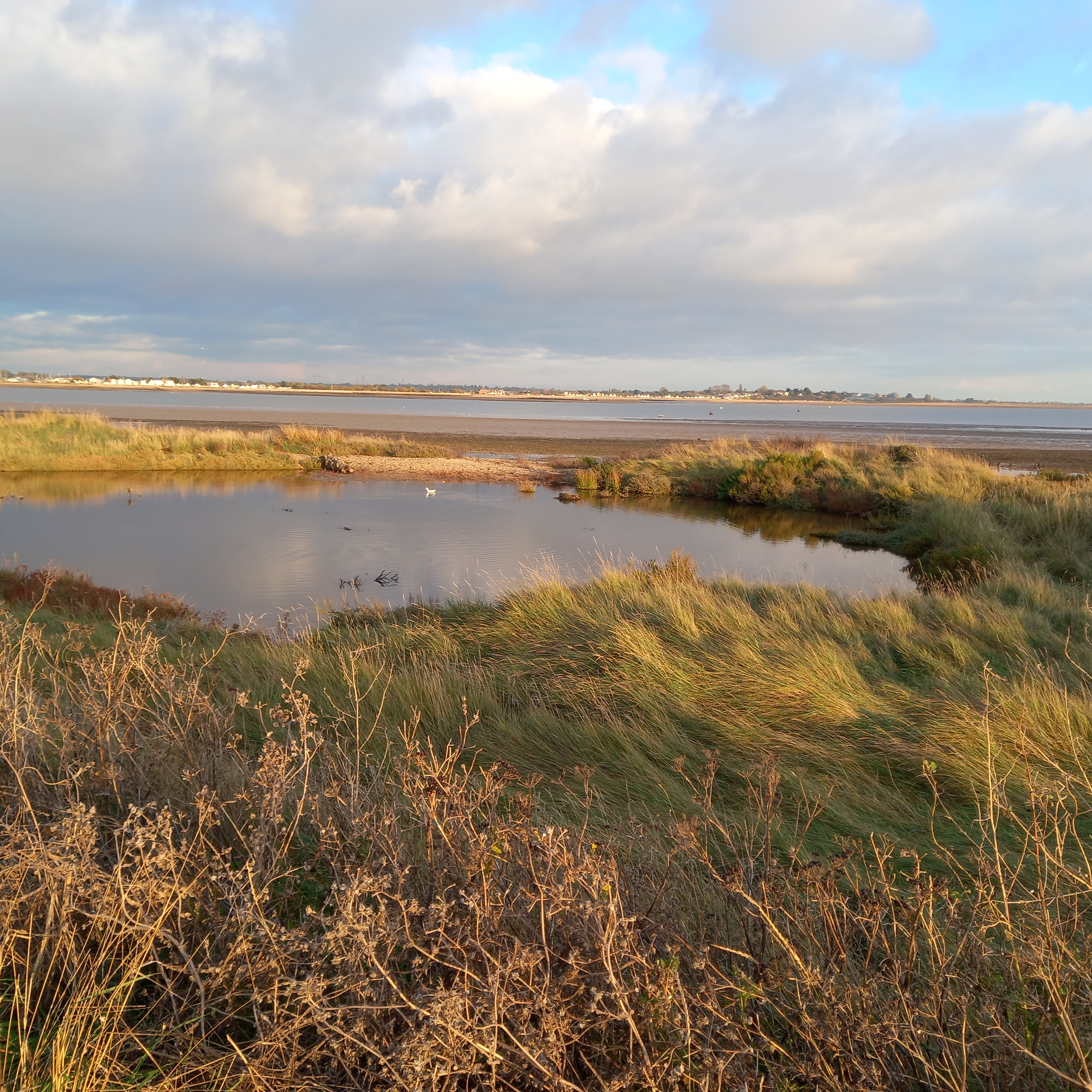
The remains of the Tudor blockhouse at East Mersea.

In 1547, King Henry VIII built a blockhouse or bulwark at East Mersea, an earthwork fort for up to six guns with a drawbridge. The keepers in the 1570s were two veteran soldiers Henry Jordan and Edmund Martyn. In the English Civil War, it was taken in 1648 by the Parliamentary Army, with the aim of blockading the River Colne during the siege of Colchester. Although described as ruinous in 1768, the earthworks were reused in 1798 as a gun battery for six 24-pounder long guns. The remains of this blockhouse are legally protected by Historic England as a scheduled monument. and are known as the Block House Stone.

Fishing grew in importance on the island during this time, with numerous fish weirs being installed. During the 16th and 17th centuries, Dutch and French settlers arrived on the island. Some locals supplemented their income from the oyster trade by smuggling, which remained popular until the mid-19th century. Smugglers favoured the Peldon Rose, immediately north of the Strood, where they would store contraband in the pond alongside the inn. In the early 19th century, the increased demand for oysters despite a limited supply from the Strood and Pyefleet Channel led traders to get oysters from other places and pass them off as native to the island.

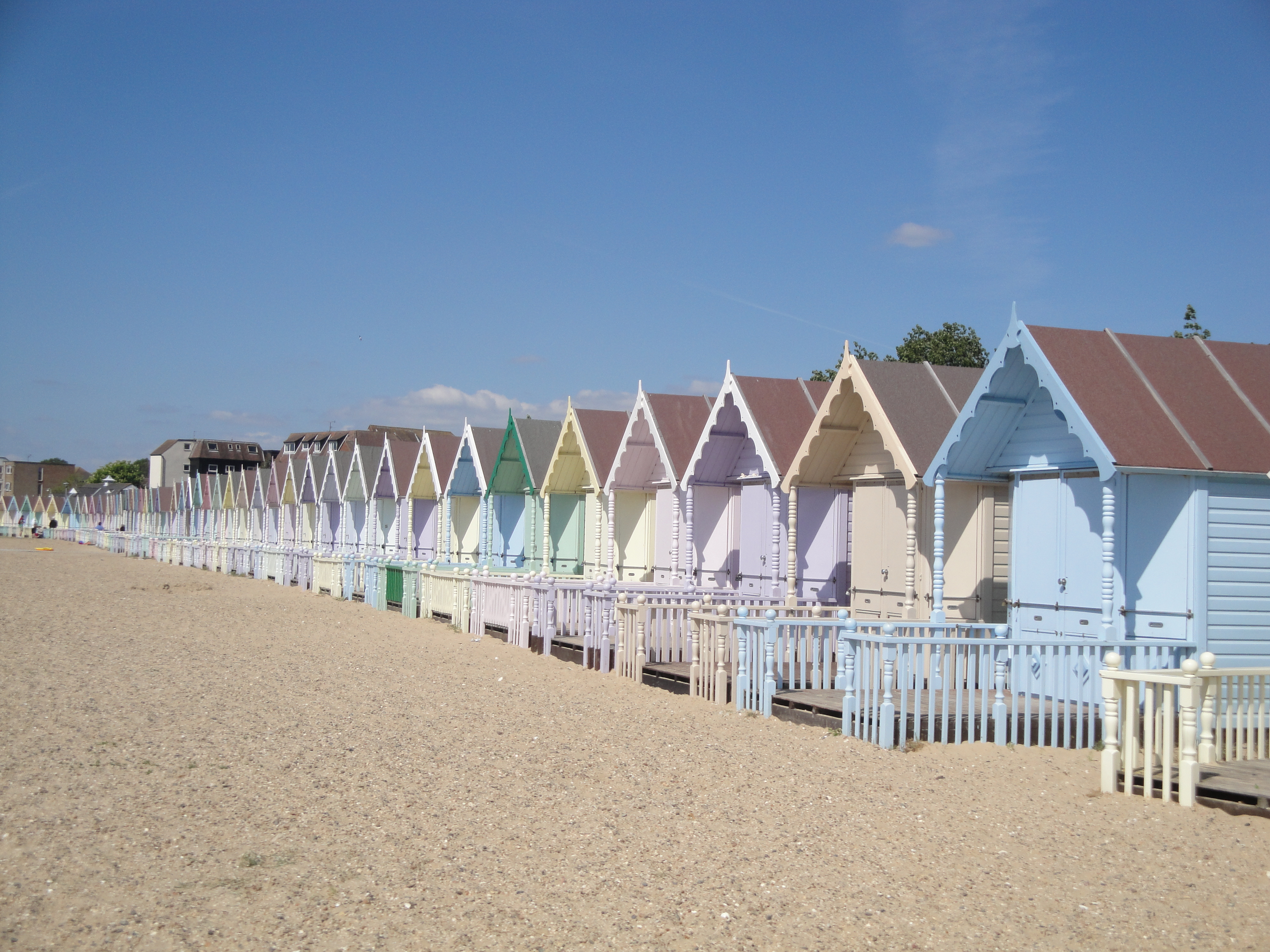
Beach huts have been established on West Mersea beach since the 1920s.

By the end of the 19th century, the land around the island had been partially reclaimed, allowing easier access. A police officer for the island was appointed in 1844 and a school was opened in 1871.

In the First World War, 320 soldiers came from Mersea Island, of which 50 lost their lives. They are commemorated at the War Memorial at the parish church. Troops were stationed at Mersea Island during the war. In 1916, a Zeppelin crash landed at nearby Great Wigborough to the northwest of the island. The survivors were stationed at Mersea before moving to prisoner-of-war camps. In 2013, the Mersea Island Tales Educational Trust obtained a grant from the Heritage Lottery Fund to set up a First World War exhibition at Ivy Farm, which features a 1916 Sopwith Pup biplane and information about soldiers from Mersea who took part in the war.

In 1926, West Mersea became a self-governing urban district, which allowed it to set up a self-contained water and sewer system. Unlike several other coastal resorts, the island did not immediately develop any holidaymaker facilities aside from the beach huts which now stretch along the Esplanade.

At the outbreak of World War II, the island became part of the front line for invasion and was heavily fortified. Along with other coastal resorts, the island drew in evacuees from London, though as the war progressed, these were moved to safer settlements further inland. 2000 troops were stationed on the island to guard against invasion. A battery of 4.7 inch guns was installed along the beach along with a Battery Observation post and a number of searchlights and pillboxes. Several of these installations survived and can still be seen along the south coast of the island, one of which has been converted into a cafe. After the war, the island suffered from severe winter weather in 1947 which destroyed much of the oyster fishery, and from the flooding of 1953, where numerous beach huts were swept out to sea.

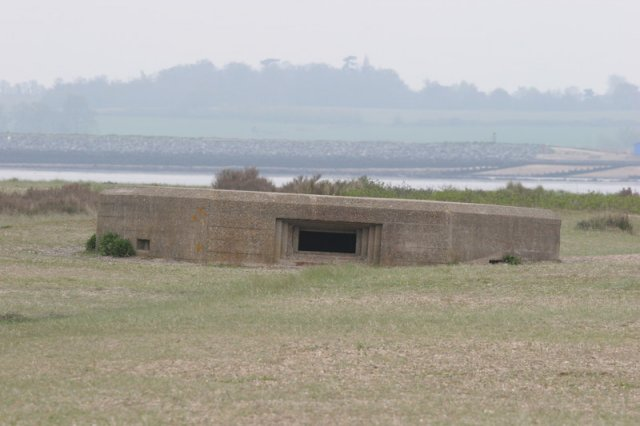
A pillbox on the east edge of Mersea Island, near the Mersea Stone

In 1963, a lifeboat service was launched following an initiative by "Diggle" Hayward who had approached the Royal National Lifeboat Institution (RNLI) about a lifeboat capability on Mersea. The West Mersea Lifeboat Station operates an Atlantic 85 class lifeboat, the RNLB Just George B-879.

Since the 1960s, the population has increased considerably, with the population of West Mersea rising from 3,140 in 1961 to 6,925 in 2001. Mersea Island has suffered less from the increased popularity of holidaying abroad when compared to nearby resorts such as Clacton and Southend, predominantly due to its isolated and rural atmosphere, and the continued popularity of sailing. In 2006, more than a thousand locals signed a petition against the proposed opening of a Tesco Express store on the island, expressing concern that it would take trade away from local businesses. Planning permission was granted the following year.

On 4 June 2012, as part of the Queen's Diamond Jubilee celebrations, the island declared a mock independence from the UK for that day. Anyone travelling to the island across the Strood paid 50p for a "passport", the proceeds of which went towards the war veteran charity Help for Heroes.

== Education ==
Mersea Island School is a foundation primary school in West Mersea with 450 pupils aged 4–11. The school has an additional nursery for 52 children aged 2–4. The school was built by Horace Darken in 1871–72, with additional classrooms added in 1897.

There are no secondary schools on the island. The nearest are Thomas Lord Audley School in Colchester and Thurstable School in Tiptree.

== Transport ==
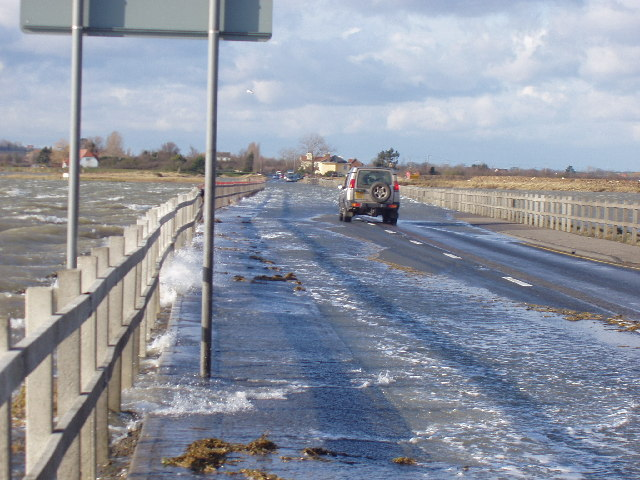
Access to Mersea Island is via the Strood, a causeway that floods at high tide

The main access to the island is via a causeway known as the Strood, carrying the Mersea–Colchester road (B1025). The road can be covered for up to an hour at high tide, especially during spring tides. On average the causeway is flooded at high tide for a week per month. During the 1953 North Sea flood, the Strood was submerged under over 6 feet (2 m) of water, cutting off access to the mainland. In 2012, West Mersea Lifeboats complained to Essex County Council about the lack of adequate signage after 13 people had to be rescued from the Strood at high tide in less than 24 hours. A webcam provides a live view of access across the Strood, while a corresponding website lists upcoming high tides and the likelihood of obstructing the road.

There has never been a railway to Mersea Island. During the railway mania of the mid-19th century, goods were transported by boat and barge. In 1911, local businessmen proposed a railway between Colchester and the island, which would have ended at a pier next to the Esplanade in the south, with an additional station in West Mersea on what is now East Road. The plans were abandoned due to the First World War.

A regular bus service links West and, infrequently, East Mersea to Colchester via the Strood and Abberton. A foot ferry runs from East Mersea to Point Clear and Brightlingsea on the other side of the Colne estuary, including a scheduled service in the summer and a dial-on-demand service in the spring and autumn.

== Culture ==
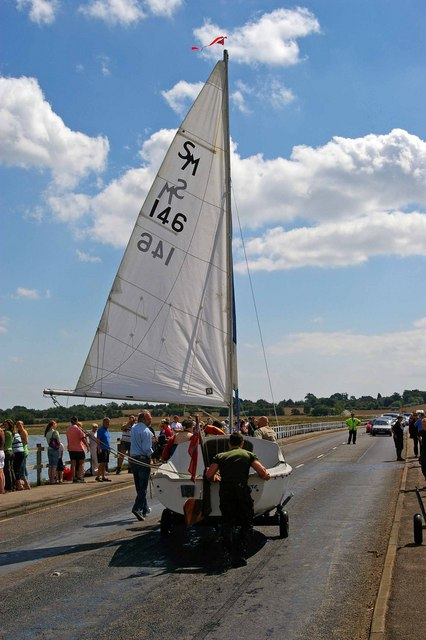
Crossing the Strood in the Round-the-Island race

The island is used as a setting for several works by Margery Allingham, who spent childhood holidays on the island. These include her first novel, Blackkerchief Dick, published in 1923 when she was 19, and her 1930 novel Mystery Mile, although the plot disguises the location as being in Suffolk. Between 1870 and 1881 the Rector of East Mersea was the Reverend Sabine Baring-Gould. Baring-Gould was the writer of the hymn "Onward, Christian Soldiers" and the author of the novel Mehalah: A Story of the Salt Marshes which was set in Mersea.

East Mersea was a site in the Survey of English Dialects in the 1950s. The island retained some rhoticity, which had otherwise died out in eastern England.

The Mersea Week is a week-long August festival of boat racing organised by the West Mersea Yacht Club and Dabchicks Sailing Club, established in 1973. During the week, starting on Monday, there are races for many boat classes in the Blackwater Estuary, from Optimist dinghies to large yachts. The most celebrated event is the Round-the-Island race, where dinghies attempt to sail round the island in either direction, helped over the Strood by volunteers. On Saturday, there is a regatta at West Mersea, followed by a selection of water sports and a firework display at dusk. One of the popular events on Saturday is walking a greasy pole rigged over the side of the hosting Thames sailing barge.

The Mersea Island Food, Drink & Leisure Festival takes place in May in the Mersea Vineyard. It combines a food theatre showing various meals, particularly oysters, with local live music and storytelling.

The island is home to Mersea Island F.C., who compete in the Essex and Suffolk Border Football League Division 1. There is a youth football team, Oyster F.C.

There is a public library on the island, located in West Mersea, run by Essex County Council.

== See also ==
- Osea Island and Northey Island, other islands in the Blackwater Estuary inaccessible at high tide
