= Barrow Hill, Essex =

Hamlet in Essex, England

Coordinates: 51.7915°N 0.9299°E

Barrow Hill
- Location within Essex
- OS grid reference: TM020143
- District: Colchester
- Shire county: Essex
- Region: East
- Country: England
- Sovereign state: United Kingdom
- Post town: COLCHESTER
- Postcode district: CO5
- Dialling code: 01206
- Police: Essex
- Fire: Essex
- Ambulance: East of England
- UK Parliament: Harwich and North Essex

Barrow Hill is a hamlet in Essex, England. It is located on Mersea Island, approximately 2 km (1.2 mi) north-northeast of West Mersea near to where the Strood causeway meets the island. The hamlet is 33 km (21 mi) east-northeast of the county town, Chelmsford. Barrow Hill is in the borough of Colchester and in the parliamentary constituency of Harwich and North Essex. The population of the hamlet is included in the civil parish of West Mersea.

It takes its name from a conspicuous Romano-British barrow.
