= West Mersea Priory =

Monastery in Essex, England

Coordinates: 51.775700°N 0.913582°E

West Mersea Priory was a Benedictine priory in West Mersea, Essex, England. It was founded in 1046 and granted by Edward the Confessor to the Abbey of Saint-Ouen in Rouen. As an alien priory it was taken by Henry V who granted it in 1422 to Henry Chichele, archbishop of Canterbury, for his college at Higham Ferrers. The priory was dissolved in 1542. There are no physical remains.
