= Church of Saint-Maclou =

Church in Normandy, France

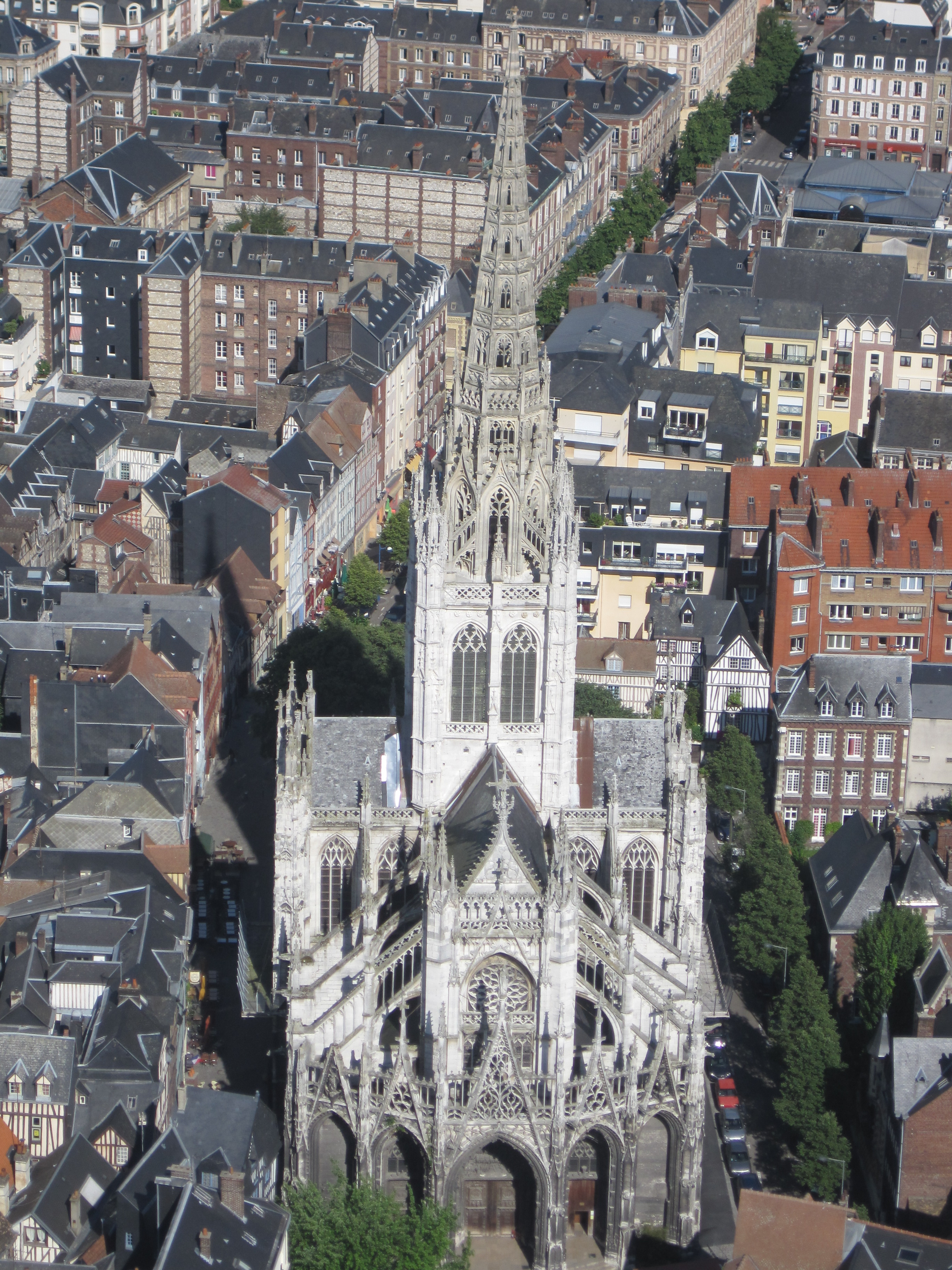
- Aerial view showing west façade and lantern tower

Religion
- Affiliation: Catholic Church
- Province: Archdiocese of Rouen
- Region: Upper Normandy
- Rite: Roman Rite
- Status: Active

Location
- Location: 49°26′23″N 1°05′54″E
- State: France
- Interactive map of Church of Saint-Maclou

Architecture
- Type: Parish church
- Style: French Gothic
- Groundbreaking: 1436
- Completed: 1521
- Monument historique
- Official name: Eglise Paroissiale Saint-Maclou
- Designated: 1840
- Reference no.: IA00021849
- Denomination: Église

Website
- rouen.catholique.fr/spip.php?rubrique934

The Church of Saint-Maclou, (French: Église Saint-Maclou de Rouen) is a Roman Catholic church in Rouen, France, named after the Saint Malo, which is considered one of the best examples of the Flamboyant style of Gothic architecture in France. Saint-Maclou, along with Rouen Cathedral, the Palais de Justice (also Flamboyant), and the Church of St. Ouen, form a famous ensemble of significant Gothic buildings in Rouen. Its spire reaches a height of 83 meters.

== History ==
The original church on the site, constructed in Romanesque style, was named after a Welsh monk, St. Malo, who was the founder of Saint-Malo commune during the 6th century. Inspired by Malo's influence, his followers believed the best way to honor the saint was to construct a church that dominated the skyline of Rouen. The original chapel was elevated to parish status by Louis IX in 1253, allowing for construction of a second cathedral to replace the aging smaller structure. However, this church would suffer from years of neglect and ultimately result in a collapsed transept roof. The third and current cathedral was started in 1437, and finished around the 1520s, and was constructed in a Flamboyant Gothic architecture style. However, the church would suffer damage from Huguenot looting during the Wars of Religion.

Following the outbreak of the French Revolution, the church was officially closed, looted, and repurposed. All religious practices were suspended, and most of the original artworks, statues, and furniture were either destroyed or removed. With all religious services suspended, the church would not be inaugurated until June 25, 1921, by Cardinal II of Ambroise who served as the archbishop of Rouen. Unlike many other churches around the country, the cathedral was spared from destruction during World War I, but would suffer severe damage from heavy bombing during World War II.

== Architecture ==
The decoration of the church is macabre, beckoning back to the church's grim past rooted in the Black Death pandemic. The transept is non-projecting complete with piers that support the above lantern tower. The choir is rather large in size for the structure and has two bays and four radiating chapels that branch off from the ambulatory. Overall, the plan places its emphasis on the transept which is midway between the choir and the nave which also includes three bays. In addition, the church itself is seen to have an emphasis of verticality and unity. Saint-Maclou has the classic three-story elevation of an arcade, triforium, and clerestory. The famous western facade is towerless with five gabled porches with flying buttresses above the aisles that are attached to the western wall featuring a rose window.

The Church of Saint Maclou was built during the transition from the late Gothic period (15th - 16th century) to the Renaissance in the 16th century. The space above a portal within the arch is referred to as the tympanum. Typically, the tympanum is filled with sculpture of a scene alluding to Heaven and Hell. The tympanum of the main entrance of the Church of Saint Maclou displays Christ standing with his hands held out to people surrounding him, those to his right heading for Heaven and those to his left heading for the fiery pits of Hell. This message, commonly depicted during the Gothic period, was designed to scare and evoke emotion from the public. The architectural plan of the church of Saint-Maclou includes radiating chapels. Saint-Maclou, like most Gothic churches, had many exterior stone statues; however, they suffered much of the French wars of religion, weather conditions, and pollution. Most inside statues disappeared during the French Revolution. Nevertheless, the chapels inside had kept their wooden furniture and decorations made in the 18th century, but most of them were destroyed during the allied bombings in 1944. The church was partly damaged by the falling of two bombs. Concerning the Renaissance outside doors with their carvings and the Renaissance organ, they escaped destruction both during the French revolution and the Second World War. In addition, the interior of the Church of Saint-Maclou includes decorations such as stained-glass windows and presents craftsmanship through carvings and sculptural work. A Gothic staircase can also be seen. All of which show off the church's Medieval and Gothic architectural styles. The interior appeals to the idea of maximizing light through the grand arched windows towards the ceiling of the church, light-colored paint on the walls and ceiling, as well as the lantern tower which offers more light to the interior of the church.

== Patrons ==
The patrons of Saint-Maclou were of the wealthy merchant class that had experienced an immense social and economic growth during the fourteenth and fifteenth centuries. The family most closely associated with the rebuilding of the church was the Dufour family. The patrons were responsible for the selection of the master mason, Pierre Robin, as well as for part of the overall style of the church. The Dufours and others are cited as being the impetus behind the similarities between Saint-Maclou and Rouen Cathedral. There were many other famous families, architects, and artists who contributed to the construction of the church as well. The Le Roux family is another example. The Le Roux family's contributions included the financing of the Church of Saint-Maclou. Jean d'Orbais was another artistic contributor who designed the interior of the church. The Church was considered as an important place to the community. This is exemplified through the contributions of wealthy families and famous artists who aided in construction and design of the church.

== Gallery ==
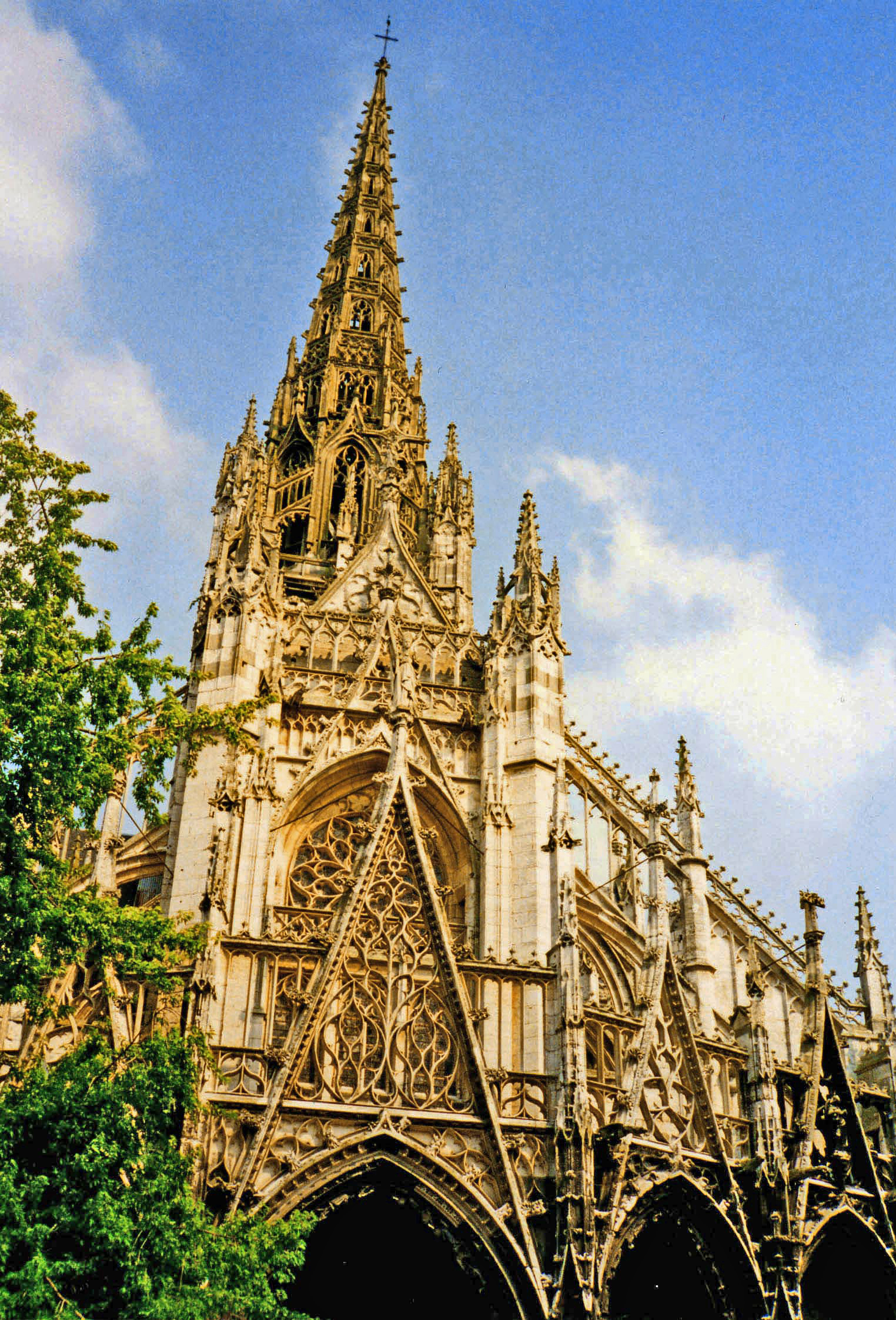
West porch and façade

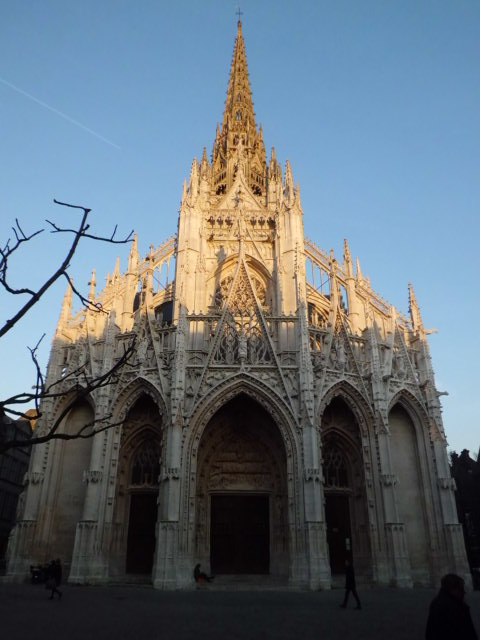
West porch and façade after cleaning in 2014

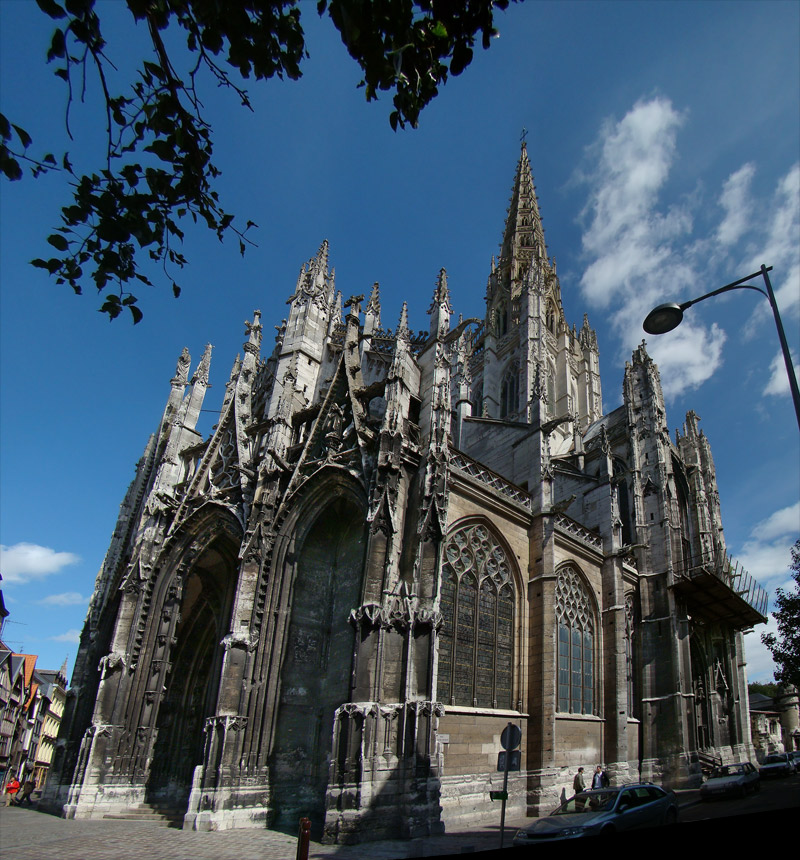
View from the southwest

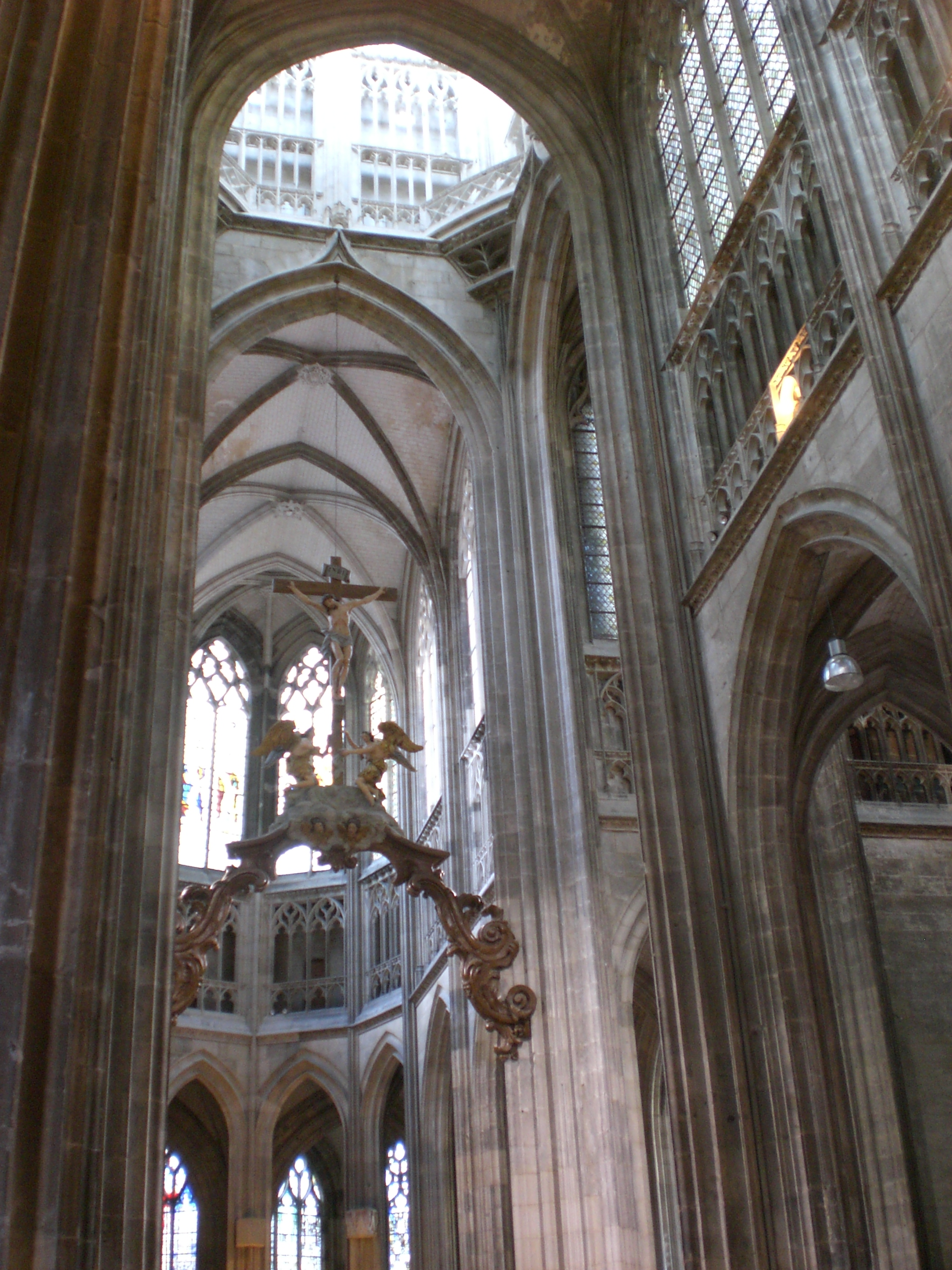
View of the crossing looking east

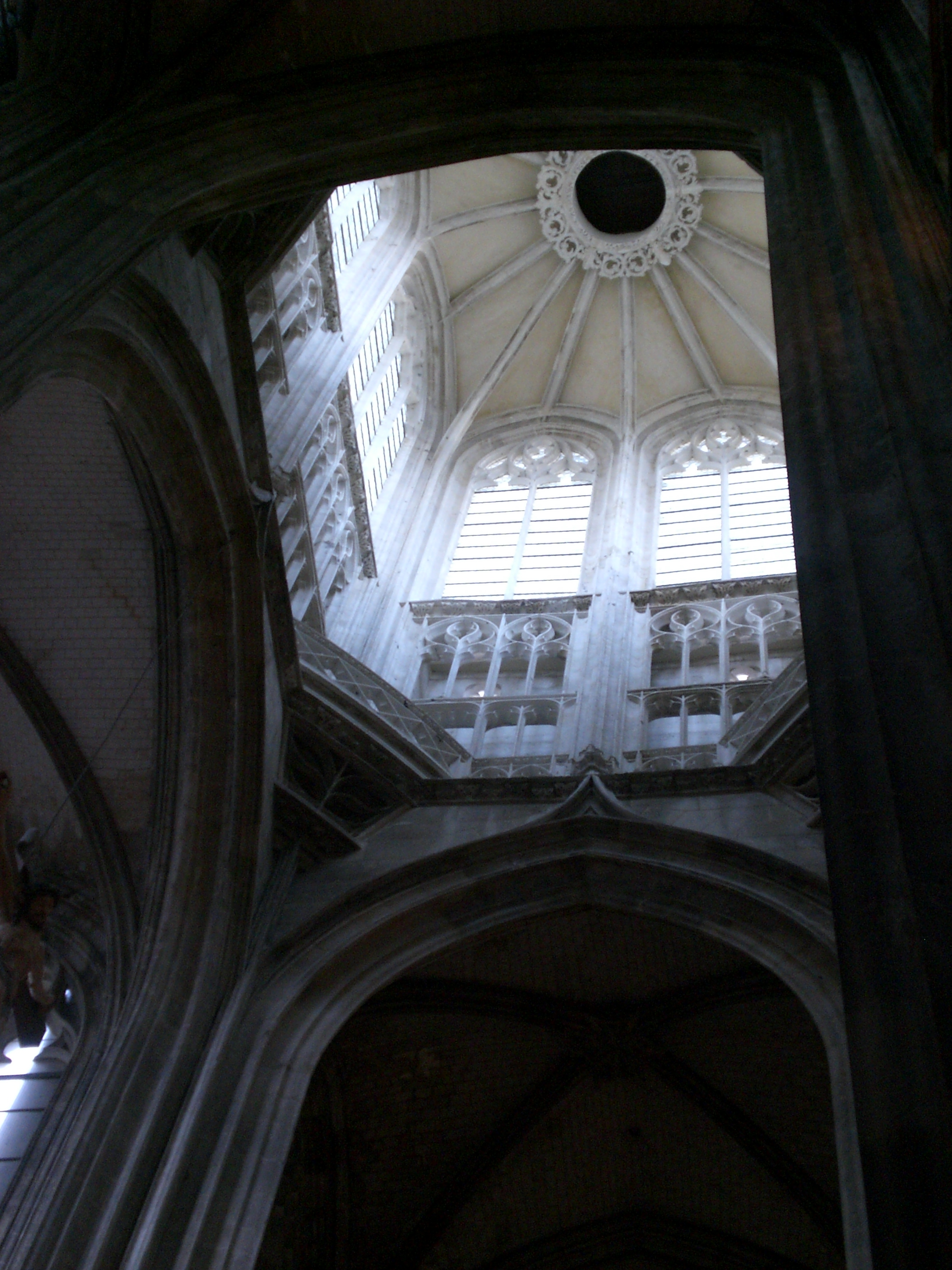
View of the lantern tower

Sculpture of Saint-Maclou

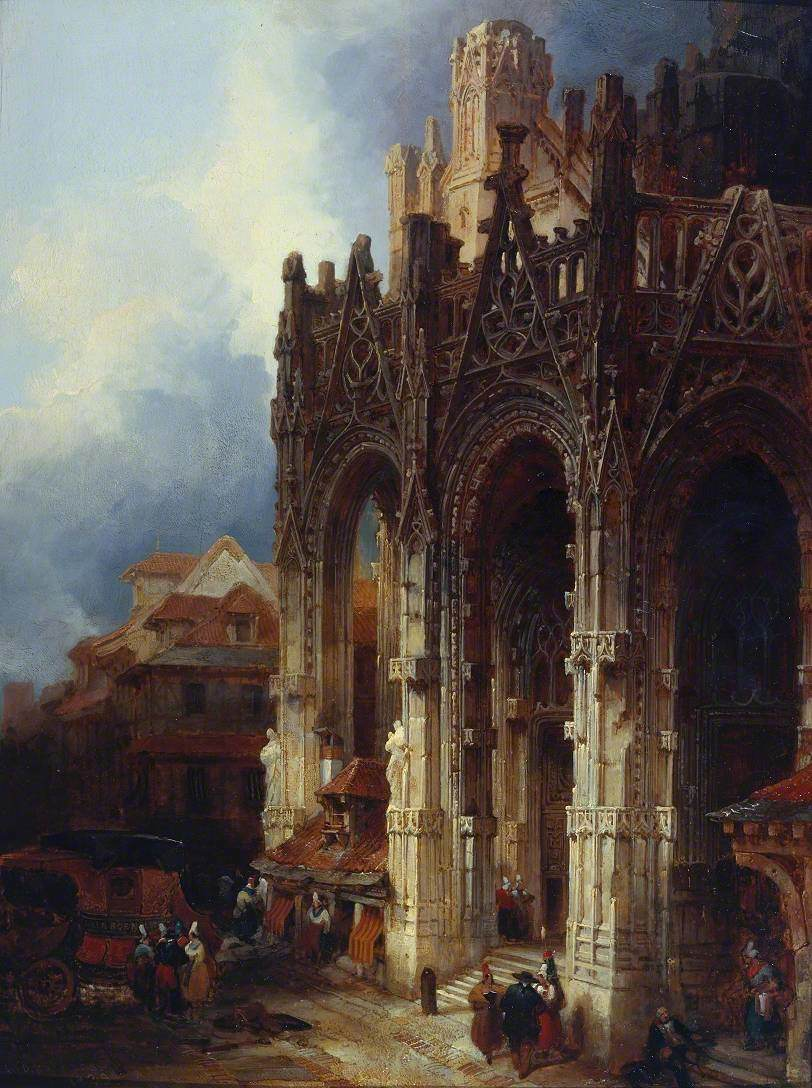
The Porch of St Maclou, Rouen by David Roberts, 1829

== Bibliography ==
- Linda Elaine Neagley, "Elegant Simplicity: The Late Gothic Design of St.-Maclou in Rouen", The Art Bulletin, Vol. 74, No. 3 (1992): 395-422. Elegant Simplicity: The Late Gothic Plan Design of St.-Maclou in Rouen
- Linda Elaine Neagley, "The Flamboyant Architecture of St.-Maclou, Rouen, and the Development of a Style", The Journal of the Society of Architectural Historians, Vol. 47, No. 4 (1988): 374-396. The Flamboyant Architecture of St.-Maclou, Rouen, and the Development of a Style
- Linda Elaine Neagley, "Late Gothic Architecture and Vision: Representation, Scenography, and Illusionism", in Reading Gothic Architecture, ed. Matthew M. Reeve (Turnhout: Brepols, 2008), 37-55.
- Linda Elaine Neagley, Disciplined Exuberance: The Parish Church of Saint-Maclou and Late Gothic Architecture in Rouen. University Park, Penn: The Pennsylvania State University Press, 1998.
