= West Mersea =

Town in Essex, England

Coordinates: 51.7784°N 0.9168°E

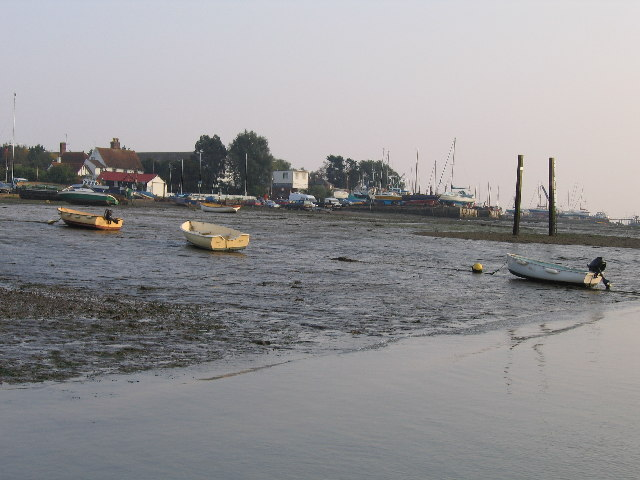

- Location within Essex
- Population: 7,221 (Parish, 2021); 7,065 (Built up area, 2021)
- OS grid reference: TM011127
- Civil parish: West Mersea
- District: Colchester
- Shire county: Essex
- Region: East
- Country: England
- Sovereign state: United Kingdom
- Post town: Colchester
- Postcode district: CO5
- Dialling code: 01206
- Police: Essex
- Fire: Essex
- Ambulance: East of England
- UK Parliament: Harwich and North Essex

West Mersea is a town and civil parish on Mersea Island in the City of Colchester district of Essex, England. It is one of two parishes on the island, the other being East Mersea. At the 2021 census the parish of West Mersea had a population of 7,221 and the built up area had a population of 7,065.

== History ==
Roman buildings and tesselated pavements close to the quayside have led to suggestions that a small Roman settlement and port existed on the site of the modern town, with a road linking it to the nearby town of Camulodunum (modern Colchester). The nearby burial mound to the north of the town is also Roman.

Edward the Confessor granted the island to the abbey of St. Ouen in Rouen, France, in 1046, and the Priory of West Mersea was established.

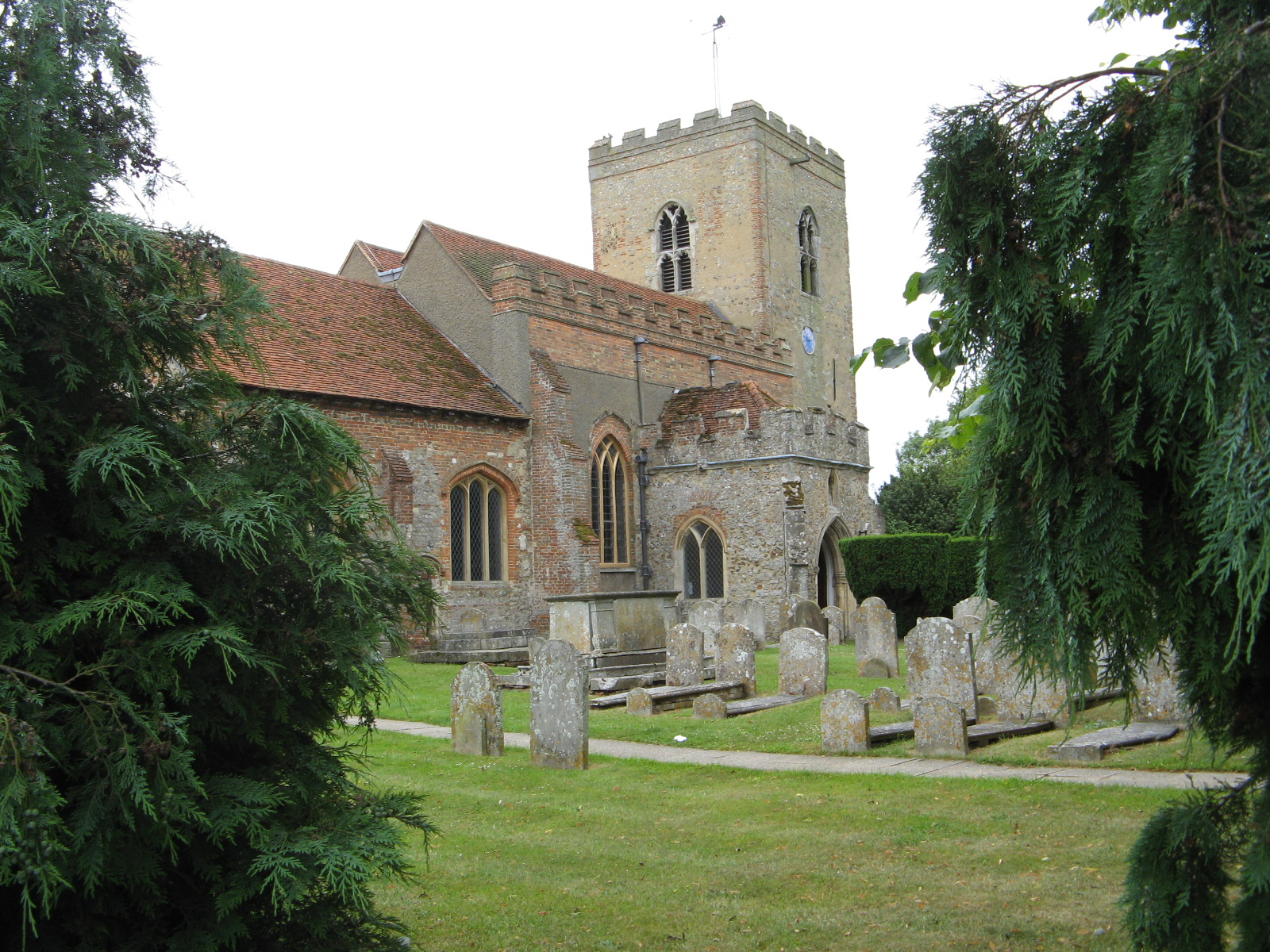
Parish Church of St Peter and St Paul

West Mersea was recorded in the Domesday Book in 1086, at which time it had a population of 84 households. The parish church, dedicated to St Peter and St Paul, dates back to the 11th century and is now a Grade I listed building.

In 1963, the lifeboat station was established next to the West Mersea Yacht Club, one of the first ten inshore lifeboat stations in the British Isles. Originally served by a D class lifeboat, this was replaced by a B class, Atlantic 21, lifeboat in 1972. In 1992, a new boathouse and slipway were opened by the Duke of Kent. In 2001, a B class Atlantic 75 lifeboat was stationed at West Mersea, and then in 2015 this was replaced with the current B class Atlantic 85 named Just George, funded by £210,000 of community donations.

== West Mersea today ==
The town is served by a community centre, various shops, restaurants, small hotels, public houses, a petrol station, bank, library, museum, and several churches, including the Norman St Peter and St Paul (Church of England), Roman Catholic, Methodist, and West Mersea Free Church, affiliated to the Baptist Union. There are four cemeteries under the care of the Town Council including a woodland burial ground.

West Mersea has a high proportion of very old people and many of the town's amenities cater for them.

As well as West Mersea Yacht Club and Dabchicks Sailing Club it also has an RNLI lifeboat station. The town hosts an annual regatta, usually in August, known as Mersea Week.

== Governance ==
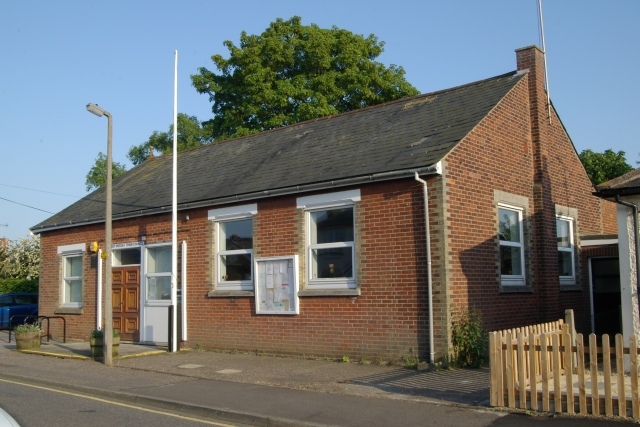
Town Council office, 10 Melrose Road

There are three tiers of local government covering West Mersea, at parish (town), district, and county level: West Mersea Town Council, Colchester City Council and Essex County Council. The town council is based at an office at 10 Melrose Road.

For national elections, West Mersea forms part of the Harwich and North Essex constituency.

=== Administrative history ===
West Mersea was an ancient parish in the Winstree hundred of Essex. When elected parish and district councils were created in 1894, West Mersea was given a parish council and included in the Lexden and Winstree Rural District. The parish was subsequently converted into an urban district in 1926.

West Mersea Urban District was abolished in 1974, becoming part of a much enlarged borough of Colchester (the borough subsequently gained city status in 2022). A successor parish called West Mersea was created as part of the 1974 reforms, covering the area of the former urban district, with its parish council taking the name West Mersea Town Council.

== In popular culture ==
The North Sea at West Mersea is the inspiration for the memoir Footloose in France, beginning there at the seaside and ending at a fish restaurant on the harbour.
