= West Mersea Yacht Club =

British sailing club

Coordinates: 51.7789°N 0.8995°E

- Burgee

- Ensign
- Short name: WMYC
- Founded: 1899; 126 years ago
- Location: West Mersea, Mersea Island, Essex, United Kingdom
- Website: www.wmyc.org.uk

West Mersea Yacht Club (WMYC) is a British yacht club that has its clubhouse in Coast Road, West Mersea, Mersea Island, Essex. It is on the estuary of the River Blackwater, approximately 12 km (7.5 mi) south of Colchester. The Blackwater estuary is a major sailing centre on the English east coast.

Founded in 1899, the club has sponsored national and international yacht racing meetings. The club has competitive offshore racing fleets and run racing throughout the UK sailing season, a cadet week and an annual regatta during 'Mersea Week'. Of its many famous members, the most notable was probably Maurice Griffiths, the yacht designer and author.

A club launch runs from Tuesdays to Sundays during the season; callsign on VHF Channel 37: YC1 (Why - See - One).

The WMYC ensign is the Red Ensign defaced with three Saxon seaxes, the symbol of Essex.
