= The Porch of St Maclou, Rouen =

Painting by David Roberts

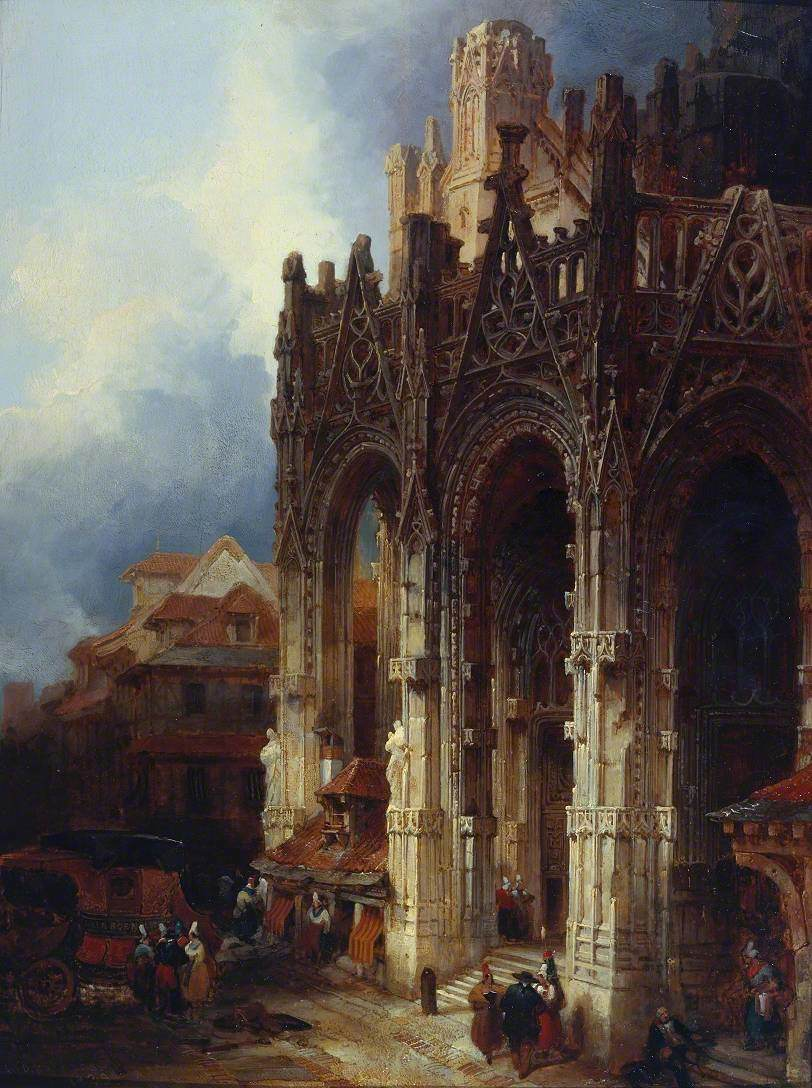
- Artist: David Roberts
- Year: 1829
- Type: Oil on panel, landscape painting
- Dimensions: 54.6 cm × 40.6 cm (21.5 in × 16.0 in)
- Location: Tate Britain, London

The Porch of St Maclou, Rouen is an oil on canvas landscape painting by the British artist David Roberts, from 1829. It depicts the Porch of the Church of Saint-Maclou in Rouen, the capital of Normandy. Roberts had visited Rouen in 1824 and it provided inspiration for numerous paintings based on sketches he had made, a number of which were displayed at the Royal Academy. Originally known as a scenic designer at the Theatre Royal, Drury Lane, Roberts became an established landscape painter of the Romantic movement. This depiction of the Medieval Gothic architecture at Rouen was characteristic of Romanticism. The painting is in the collection of the Tate Britain, having been acquired in 1913.

== Bibliography ==
- Macmillan, Duncan. Scottish Art, 1460-2000. Mainstream Publishing, 2000.
- Sim, Katherine. David Roberts R.A., 1796–1864: A Biography. Quartet Books, 1984.
