= East Mersea =

Village in Essex, England

Coordinates: 51.79570°N 0.98595°E

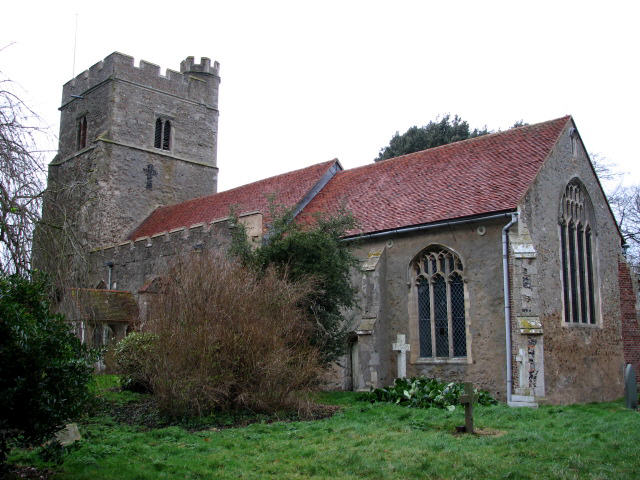
- St Edmund's church, East Mersea

- Location within Essex
- Population: 293 (Parish, 2021)
- OS grid reference: TM060150
- Civil parish: East Mersea
- District: City of Colchester
- Shire county: Essex
- Region: East
- Country: England
- Sovereign state: United Kingdom
- Post town: Colchester
- Postcode district: CO5
- Dialling code: 01206
- Police: Essex
- Fire: Essex
- Ambulance: East of England
- UK Parliament: Harwich and North Essex

East Mersea is a village and civil parish on Mersea Island in the City of Colchester district of Essex, England. The other parish on the island is West Mersea. Both were part of the manor of Mersea mentioned in the Domesday Book of 1086. At the 2021 census East Mersea parish had a population of 293.

== St Edmund's Church ==
The Grade I listed parish Church of St Edmund King and Martyr dates from the 12th or 13th century with the nave and tower dating from the 14th and 15th century respectively. The oak and red-brick south porch is 19th century. Inside there is a 15th-century octagonal font and mid-17th century pulpit.

The rector at East Mersea from 1871 to 1881 was the scholar Sabine Baring-Gould who wrote the words for the hymn Onward Christian Soldiers.

== Grave of Sarah Wrench ==
The grave of Sarah Wrench (1833–1848), by the North wall of the chancel at St. Edmund's Church in East Mersea is unusual for an English grave because it is covered by a mortsafe, a protective cage used at the time in Scotland to protect corpses from graverobbers.

Richard Jones, in Myths of Britain and Ireland, refers to popular speculation that Sarah Wrench was a witch, and that the cage was designed to keep her from escaping her grave after death. Although East Anglia was at one time known for witch trials, this was in the sixteenth and seventeenth centuries, not the mid-nineteenth.
