= Ray Island =

Nature reserve in Essex, England

Coordinates: 51.801°N 0.915°E

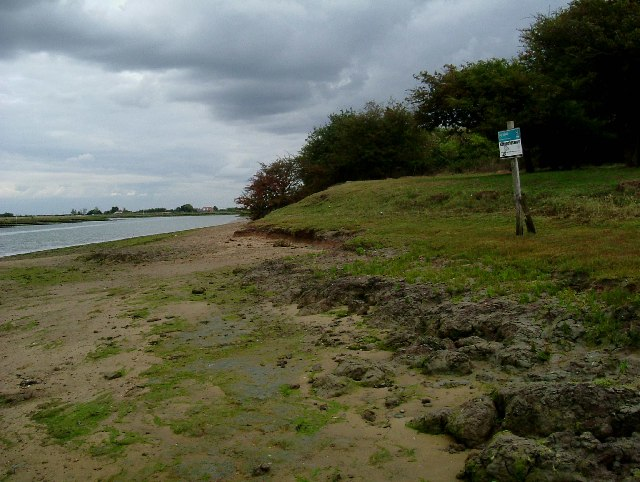
- Interactive map of Ray Island
- Type: Nature reserve
- Location: Mersea Island, Essex, U.K.
- OS grid: TM 011 154
- Area: 40.5 hectares (100 acres)
- Owner: National Trust
- Manager: National Trust (previously managed by Essex Wildlife Trust)

Ray Island, also known as the Ray, is a 40.5-hectare (100-acre) nature reserve west of Mersea Island in Essex. The site is a sandy hill rising out of an area of saltmarsh between Strood Channel and Ray Channel. The island is owned by the National Trust, who bought it in 1970. It was leased by the National Trust to the Essex Wildlife Trust, which managed the site. Following the cessation of the lease, the National Trust has resumed responsibility for the island's management.

== Wildlife ==
The island has rough grassland and a shingle foreshore. Its flora includes saltmarsh plants such as lax flowered sea-lavender, sea rush and golden samphire. Breeding birds include redshank, oystercatcher and shelduck.

== Environmental designations ==
The site has been designated as Site of Special Scientific Interest (SSSI), Marine Conservation Zones (MCZ), Ramsar Site, Special Area of Conservation (SAC) and a Special Protection Area (SPA).

== Literature ==
=== Mehalah ===
Ray Island was the setting for the novel Mehalah: A Story of the Salt Marshes by Sabine Baring-Gould, who was the rector of East Mersea for 10 years from 1871. Baring-Gould describes the island thus in the first chapter:

A more desolate region can scarce be conceived, and yet it is not without beauty. In summer, the thrift mantles the marches with shot satin, passing through all gradations of tint from maiden's blush to lily white. Thereafter a purple glow steals over the waste, as the sea lavender bursts into flower, and simultaneously every creek and pool is royally fringed with sea aster. A little later the glasswort, that shot up green and transparent as emerald glass in the early spring, turns to every tinge of carmine.

=== The Essex Serpent ===
The marshy landscape also formed part of the inspiration for The Essex Serpent, by Sarah Perry.

=== The Turnglass ===
Ray and Mersea are the setting for The Turnglass, by Gareth Rubin.

== Folklore ==
A bear is said to have escaped from a ship onto the island and killed a group of fisherman who had landed there.

There is also the tale is of a drunkard who chased his wife and daughter into the marshes but he was drowned by the rising tide. It has been claimed that his shouts can be heard along with the panting of the mother and the baby's crying.

It is also claimed there is the ghost of a Roman centurion and the sound of a horse's hooves can be heard.

== Access ==
General public access is by boat via the Ray Channel from Mersea. If using your own boat, it is important to check the state and times of the tide. Camping, barbecues and fires are banned by the trust.
