= Saint-Ouen Abbey, Rouen =

Saint-Ouen Abbey
- Saint Owen Abbey
- Abbaye Saint-Ouen de Rouen
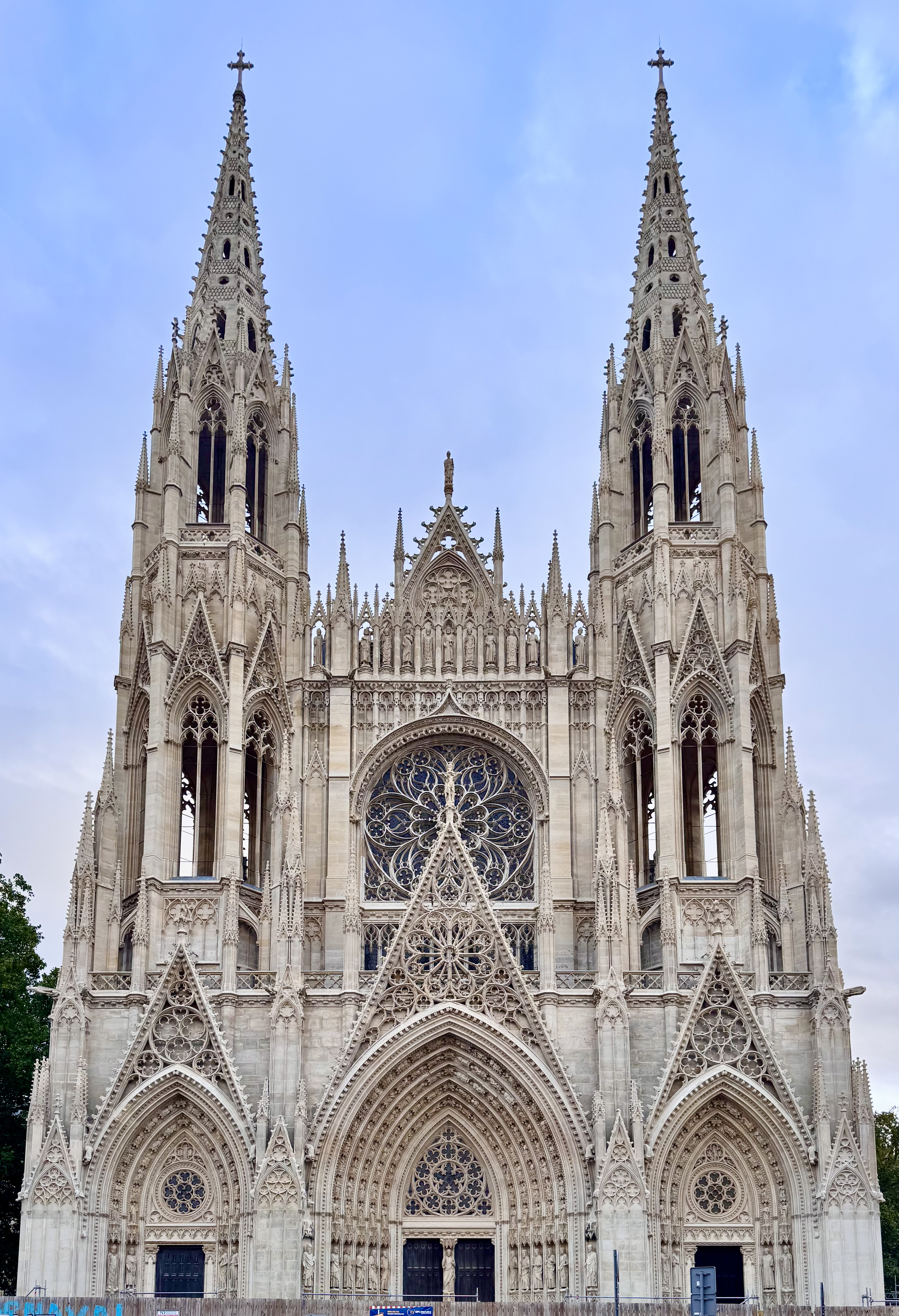
- Westwork of Saint Ouen Abbey Church after its restoration

- Location of Saint-Ouen
- 49°26′33″N 1°05′59″E
- Location: City Hall Square, Rouen, Normandy
- Country: France
- Denomination: Catholic
- Website: rouen.catholique.fr

History
- Status: Abbey Church
- Founded: 750
- Dedication: Saint-Ouen
- Dedicated: 17 October 1126

Architecture
- Functional status: Defunct
- Heritage designation: Classée Monument Historique
- Designated: 1840
- Architectural type: church
- Style: Gothic, Flamboyant
- Groundbreaking: 1318
- Completed: 1537

Administration
- Archdiocese: Rouen

Clergy
- Archbishop: Dominique Lebrun
- Building details

General information
- Location: Rouen, Normandy

Height
- Antenna spire: 82m

Saint-Ouen Abbey, (French: Abbaye Saint-Ouen de Rouen) is a large Gothic Catholic church and former Benedictine monastic church in Rouen. It is named for Audoin (French: Ouen, English: Owen), 7th-century bishop of Rouen in modern Normandy, France. The church's name is sometimes anglicized as St Owen's. Built on a similar scale to nearby Rouen Cathedral, the abbey is famous for both its architecture and its large, unaltered Cavaillé-Coll organ, which was described by Charles-Marie Widor as "a Michelangelo of an organ". With the cathedral and the Church of Saint-Maclou, Saint-Ouen is one of the principal French Gothic monuments of the city.

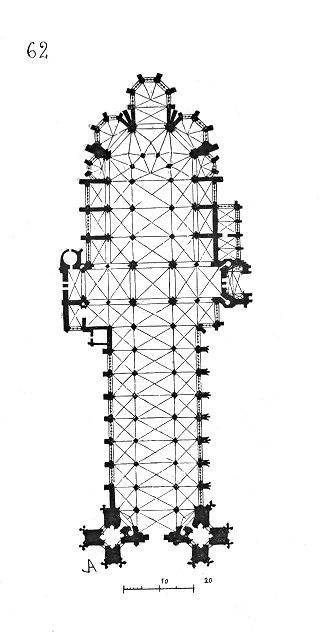
Plan.

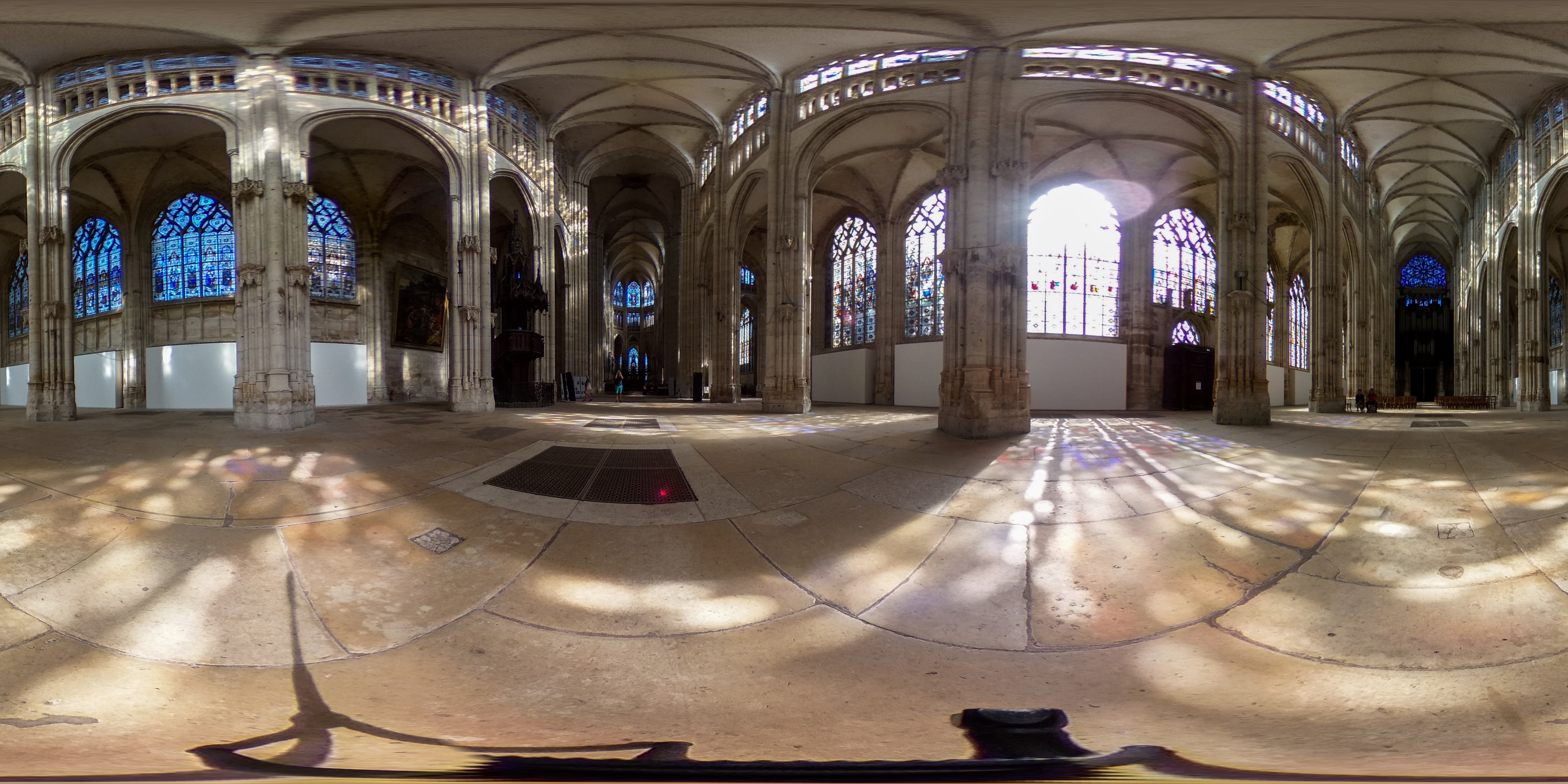
360° panorama, interior (view as a 360° interactive panorama)

== The Abbey ==
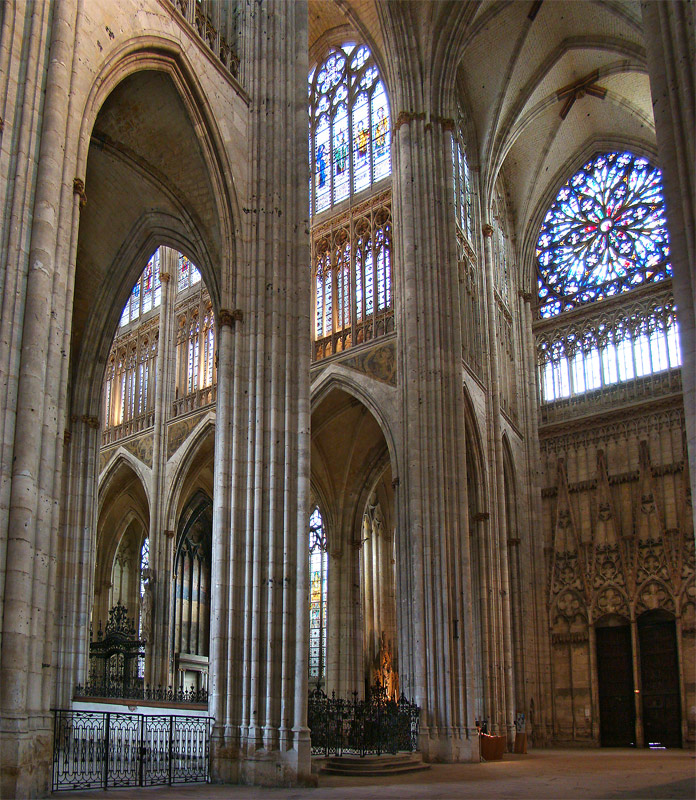
At the transept crossing

The current church building was originally built as the abbey church of Saint-Ouen for the Benedictine Order, beginning in 1318 and interrupted by the Hundred Years' War and sacked and badly damaged during the Harelle. It was completed in the 15th century in the Flamboyant style.

The foundation of Saint-Ouen Abbey has been variously credited, among others, to Chlothar I and to Clotilde, royal saint and wife of Clovis I, but evidence is scanty. It was dedicated at first to Saint Peter; when the body of Audoin, Archbishop of Rouen (d. 678), was buried there; the name of St Peter and St Ouen became common and finally St Ouen only.

The history of the abbey, on record from the 1000, is unremarkable; a list of abbots is in Gallia Christiana XI, 140. The fourth abbot, Nicolas (r. 1042–1092) was the first cousin of William the Conqueror, and supplied ships and men for the Norman Conquest.

In 1660 the monastery was united to the Congregation of Saint Maur, and when suppressed, in 1794, the community numbered twenty-four. The abbey buildings were confiscated at the time of the French Revolution and were subsequently occupied by the Town Hall of Rouen.

== Architecture ==
The church is 137 m in length under 33 m high vaults. The central crossing is surmounted by an unusual lantern-style tower similar to that at Ely Cathedral in England. The tower was completed in the Flamboyant style.

The well-preserved stained glass of the nave dates to the 15th and 16th centuries, and features jewel tones among panels of clear and frosted white glass. These materials allow more light to filter into the nave, creating a brighter interior than is typical of Gothic churches. Despite the use of Flamboyant tracery in the aisles, triforium, and clerestory, the nave maintains a conservative appearance through the use of compound piers, trumpet bases, and capitals which helps maintain harmony throughout the edifice.

The west façade was never completed during the Middle Ages. The present structure was constructed between 1846 and 1851 in a Neo-Gothic style that bears little resemblance to the original Late Gothic designs.

Architectural Details

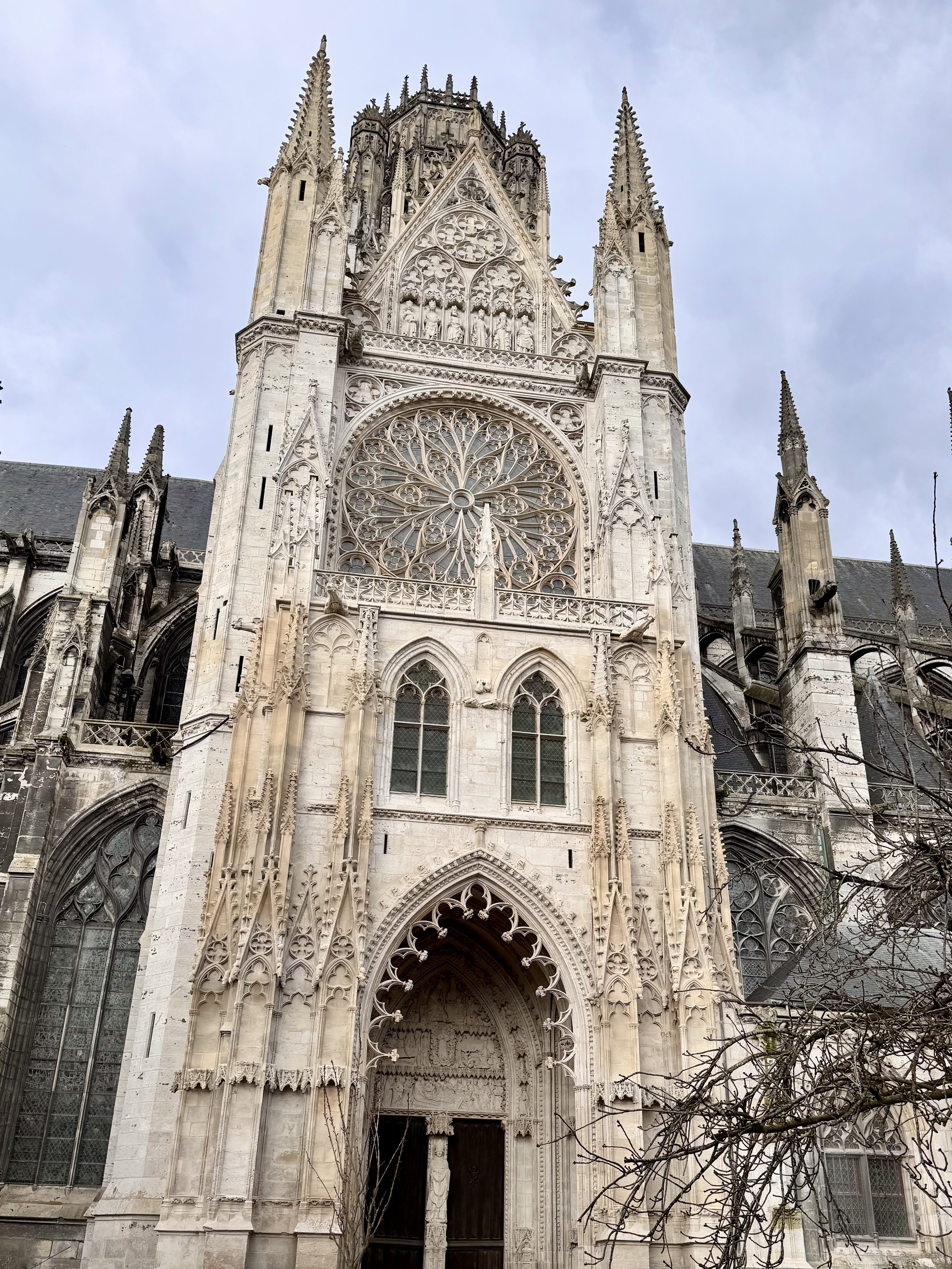
The Portail des Marmousets after restoration.

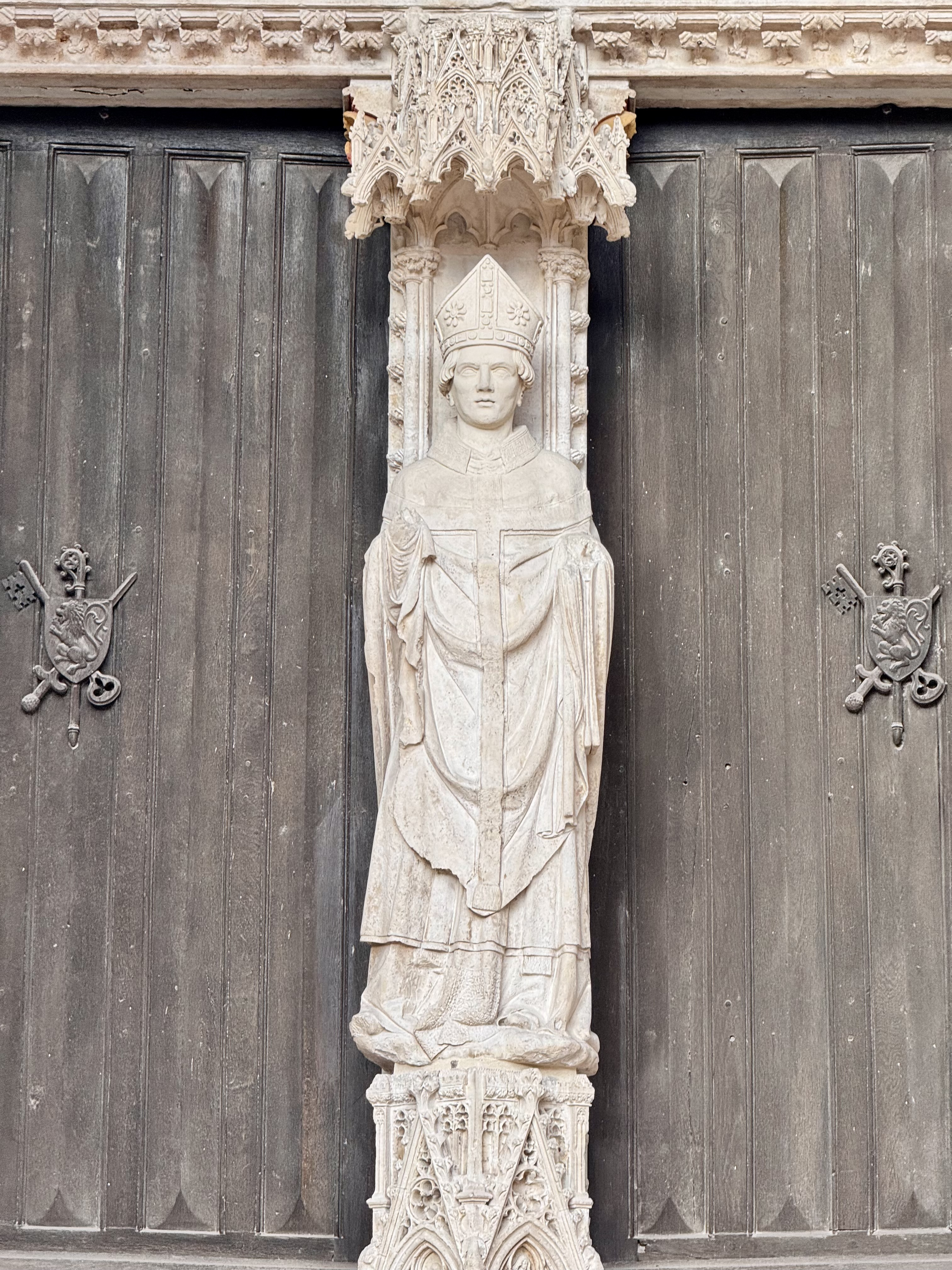
Statue of Saint Owen on the trumeau of the Portail des Marmousets after restoration.

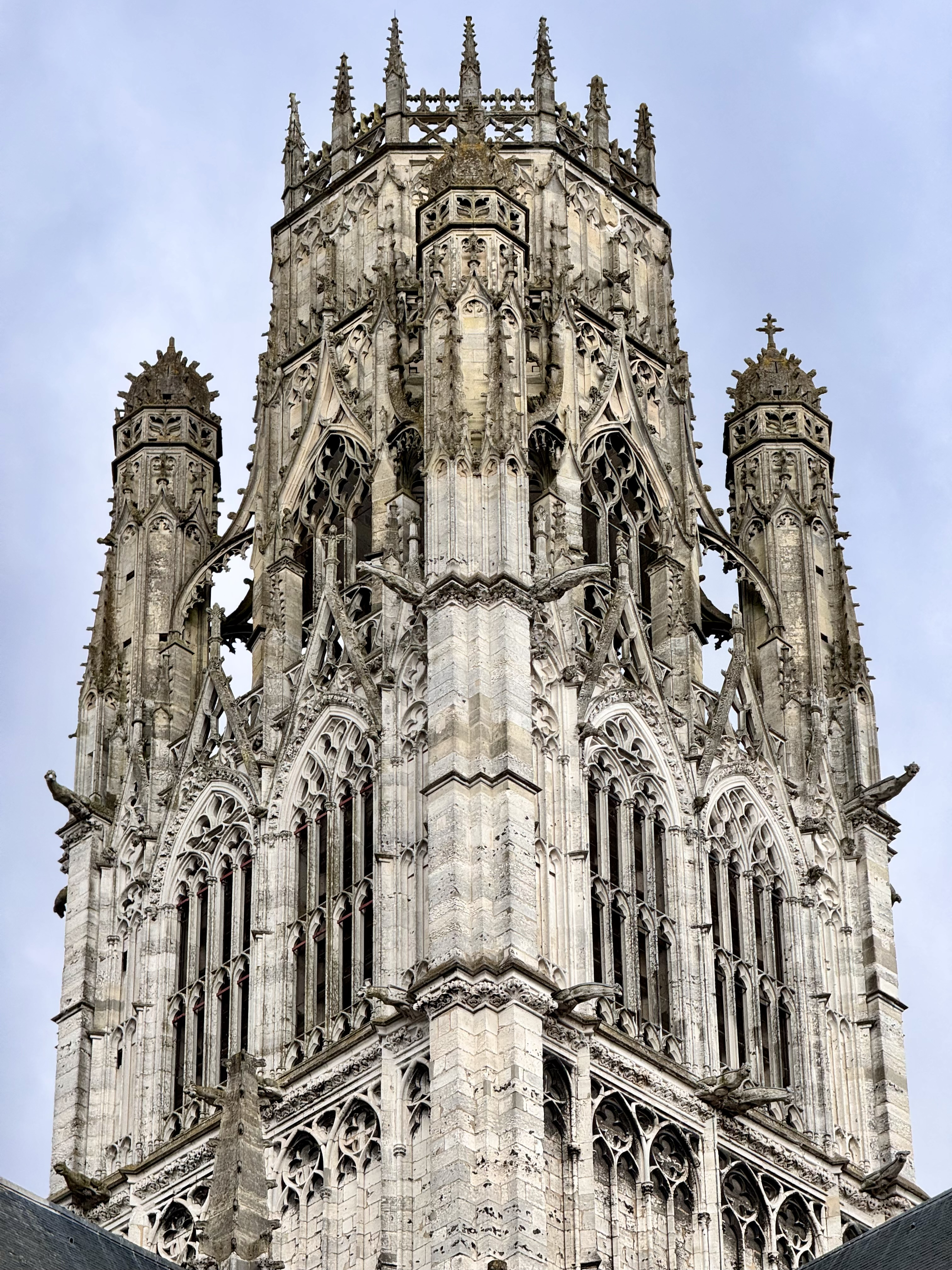
The Crossing Tower.

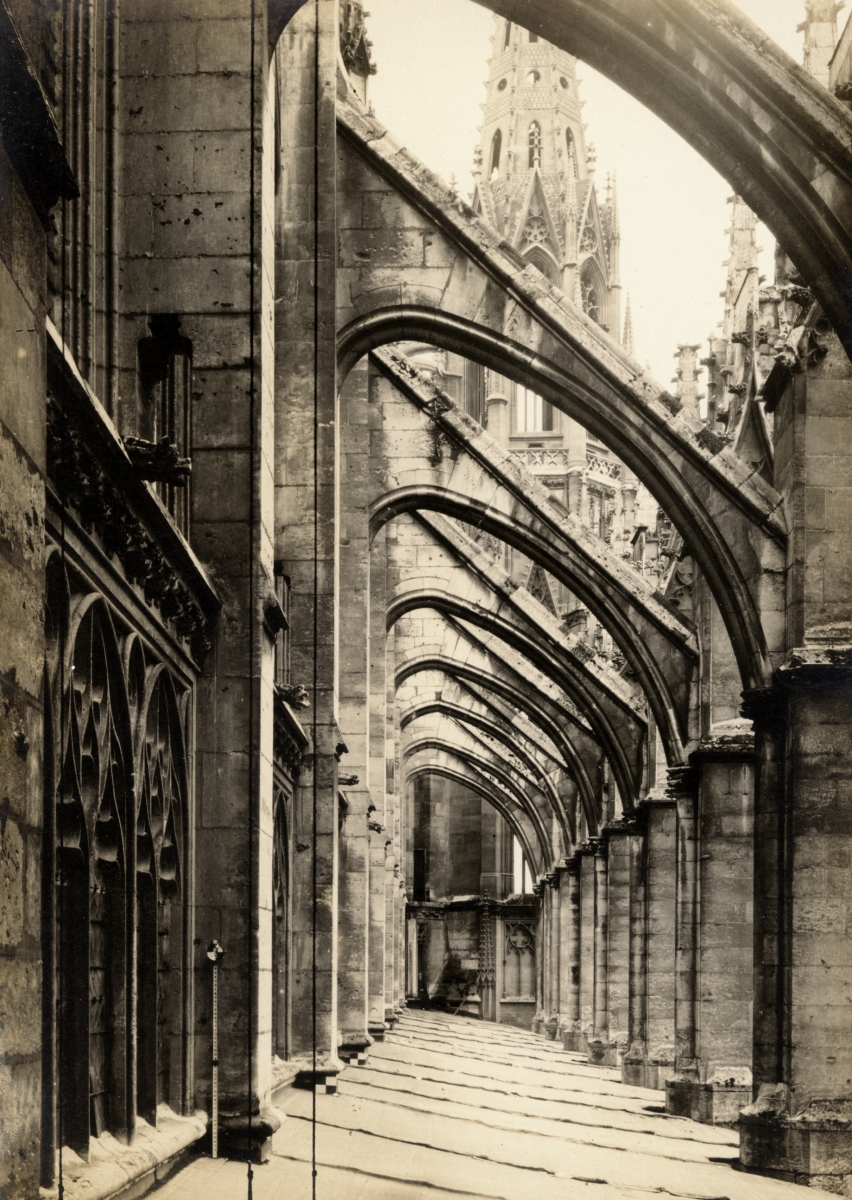

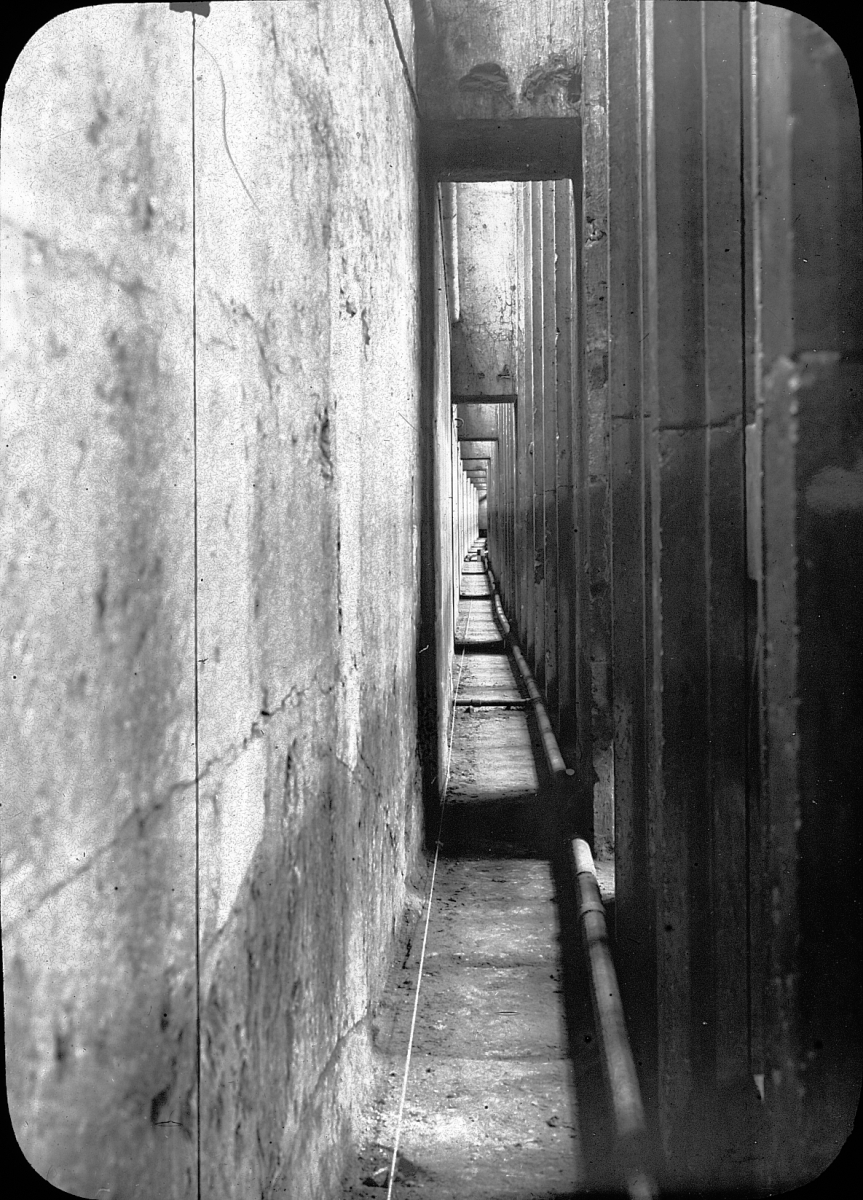

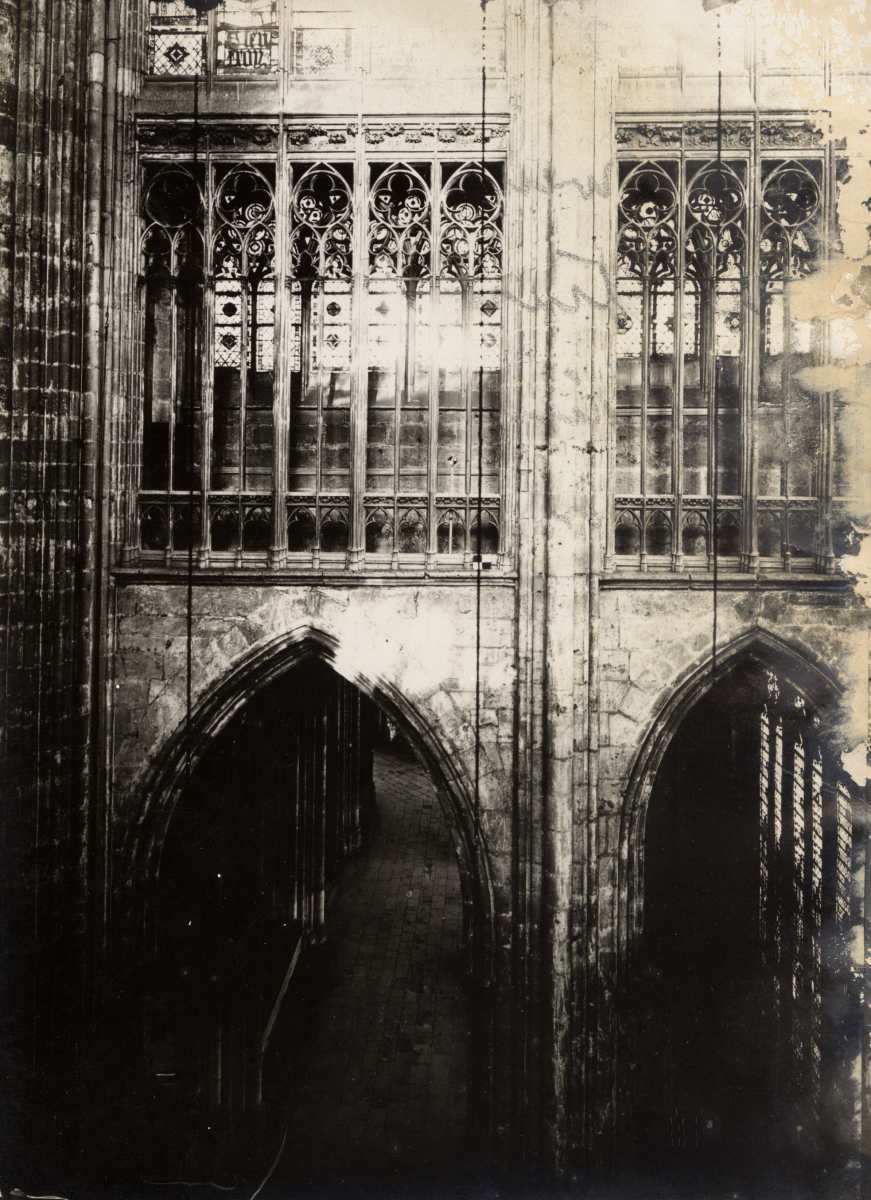

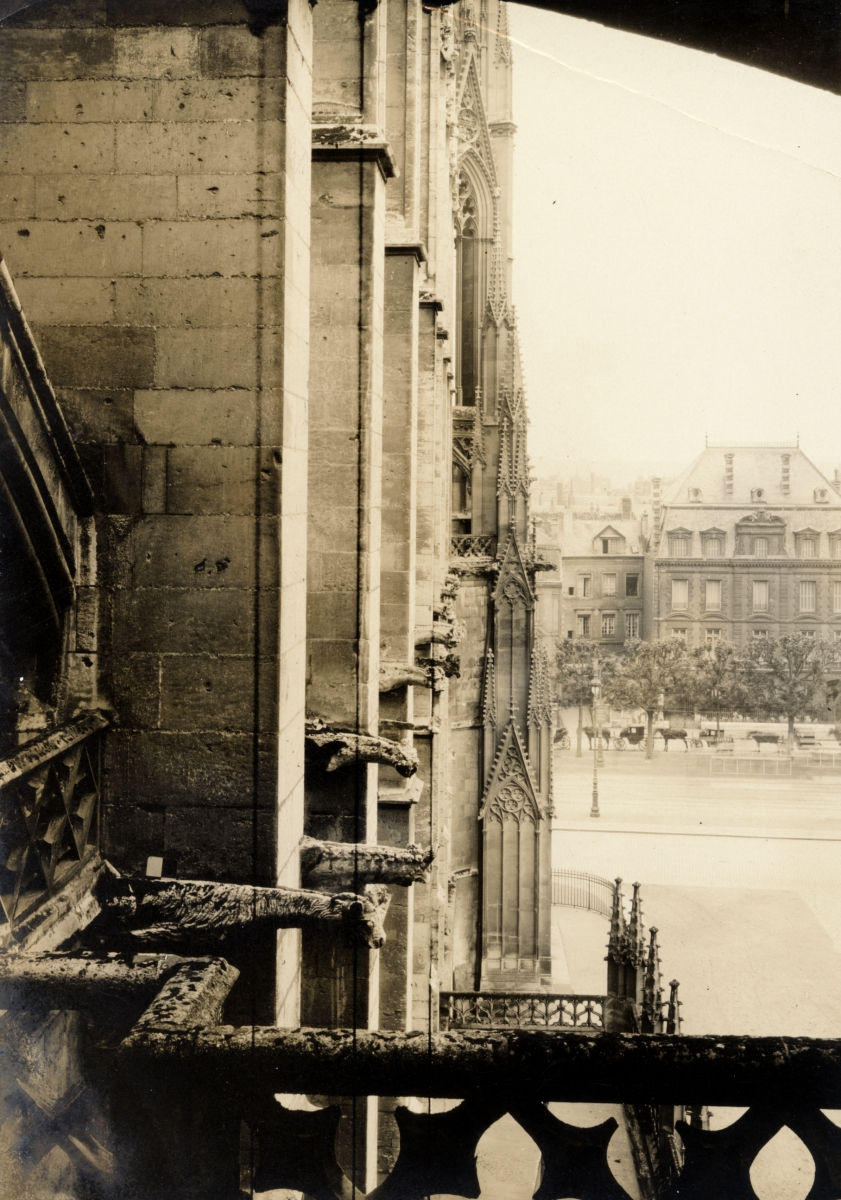

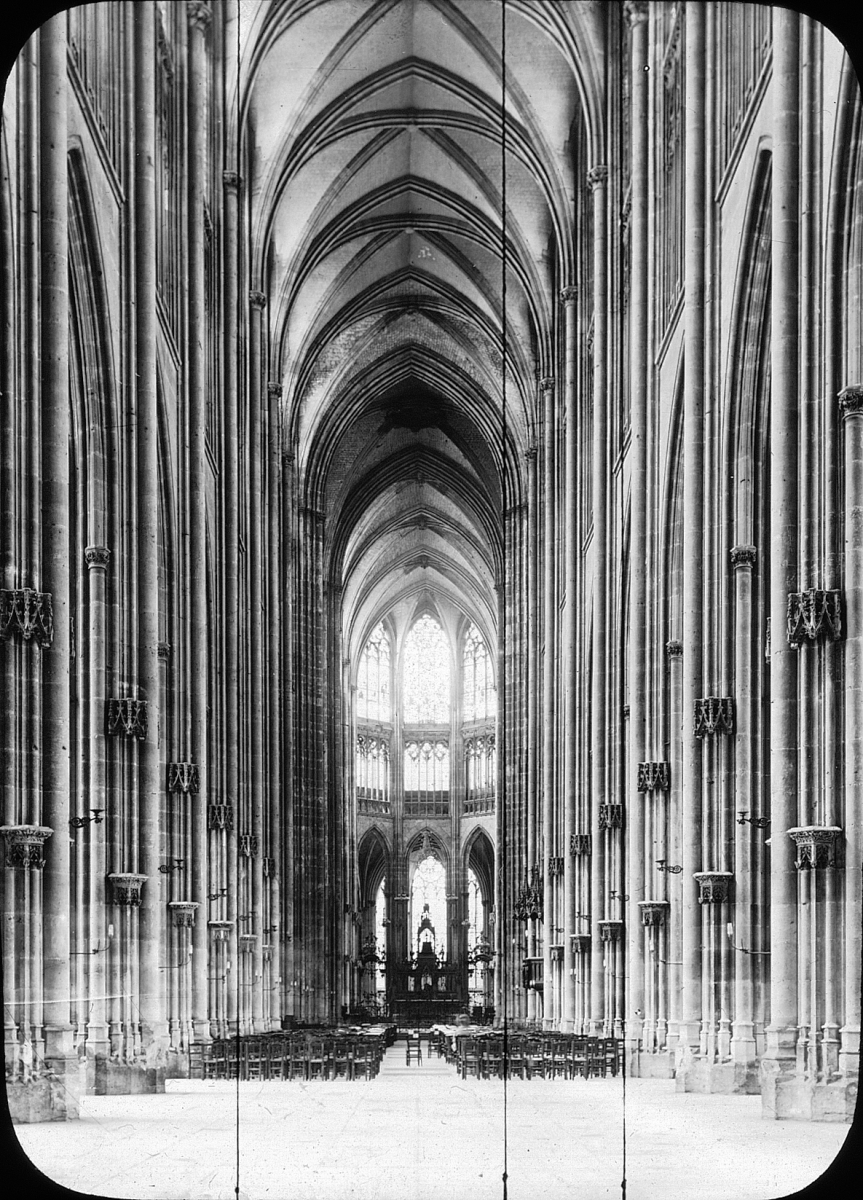

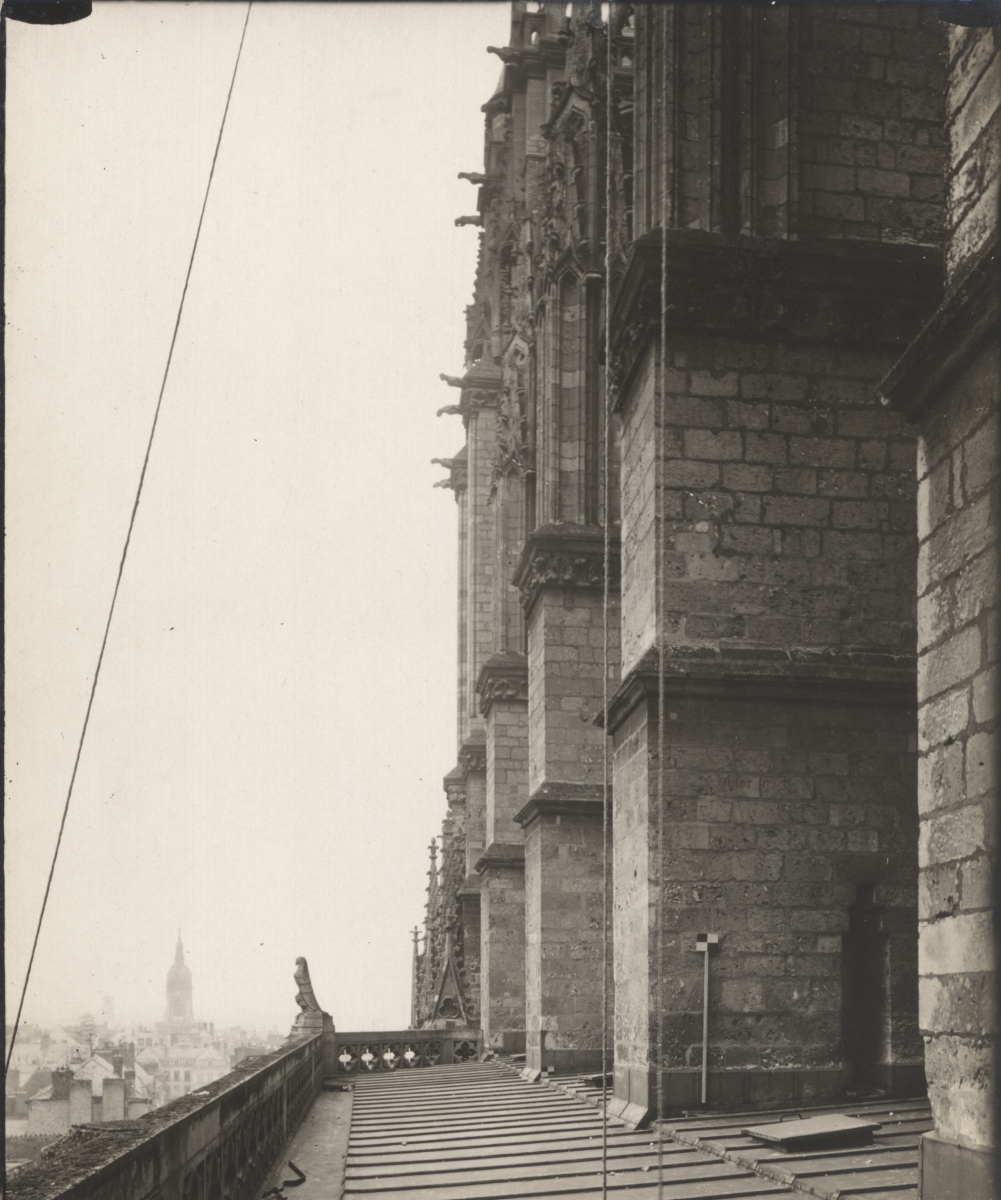

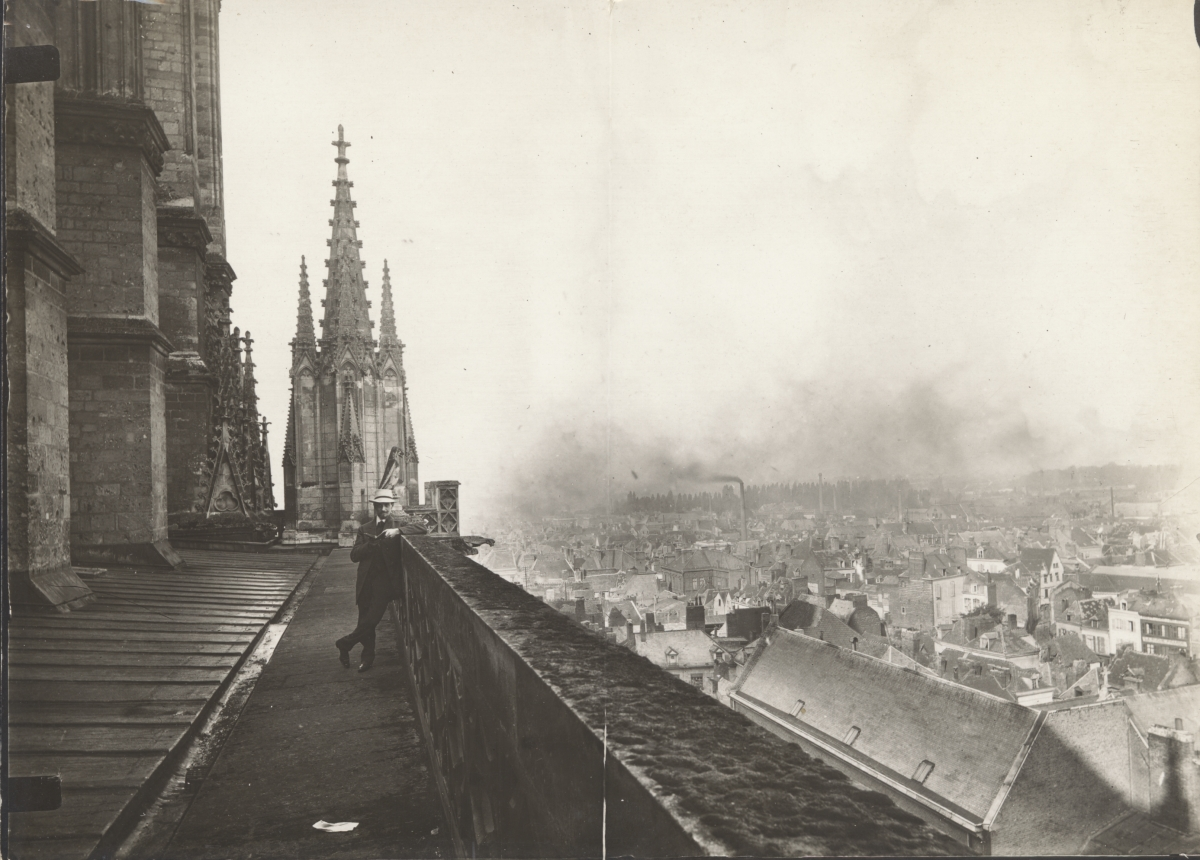

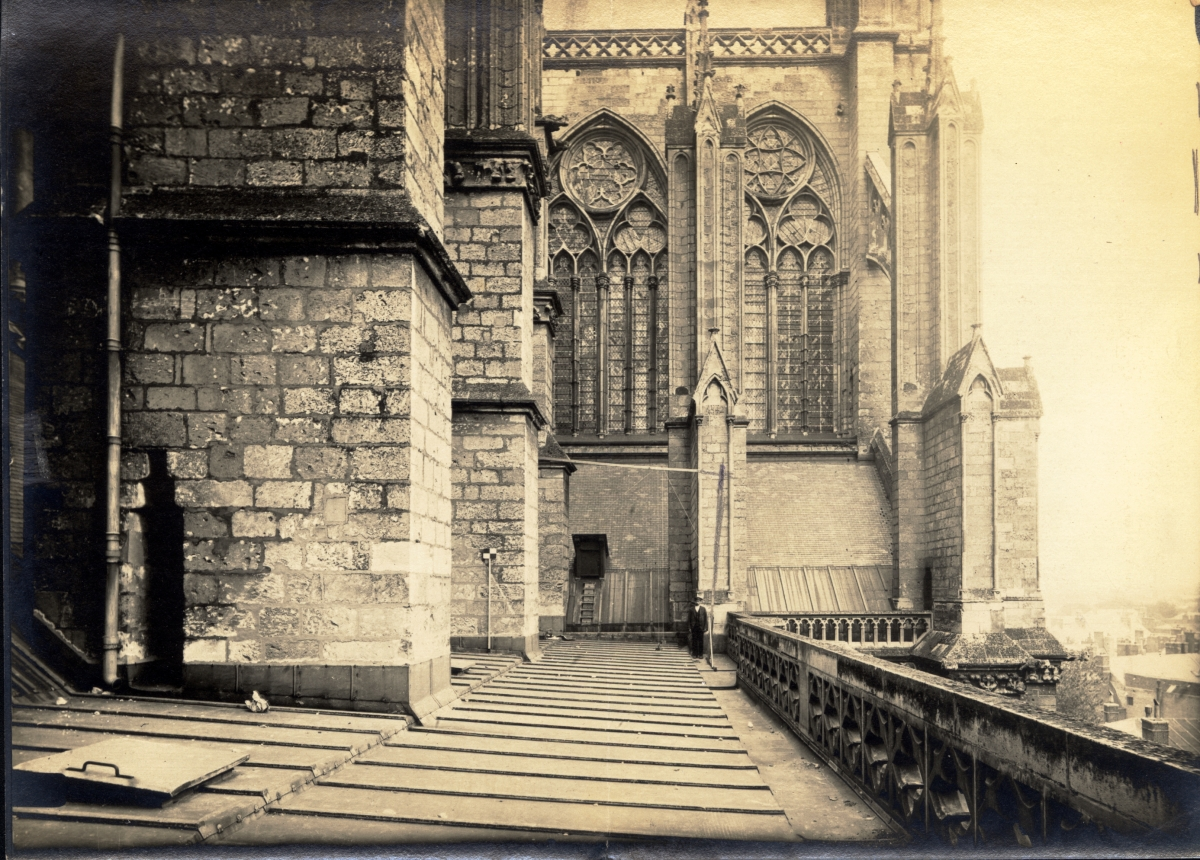

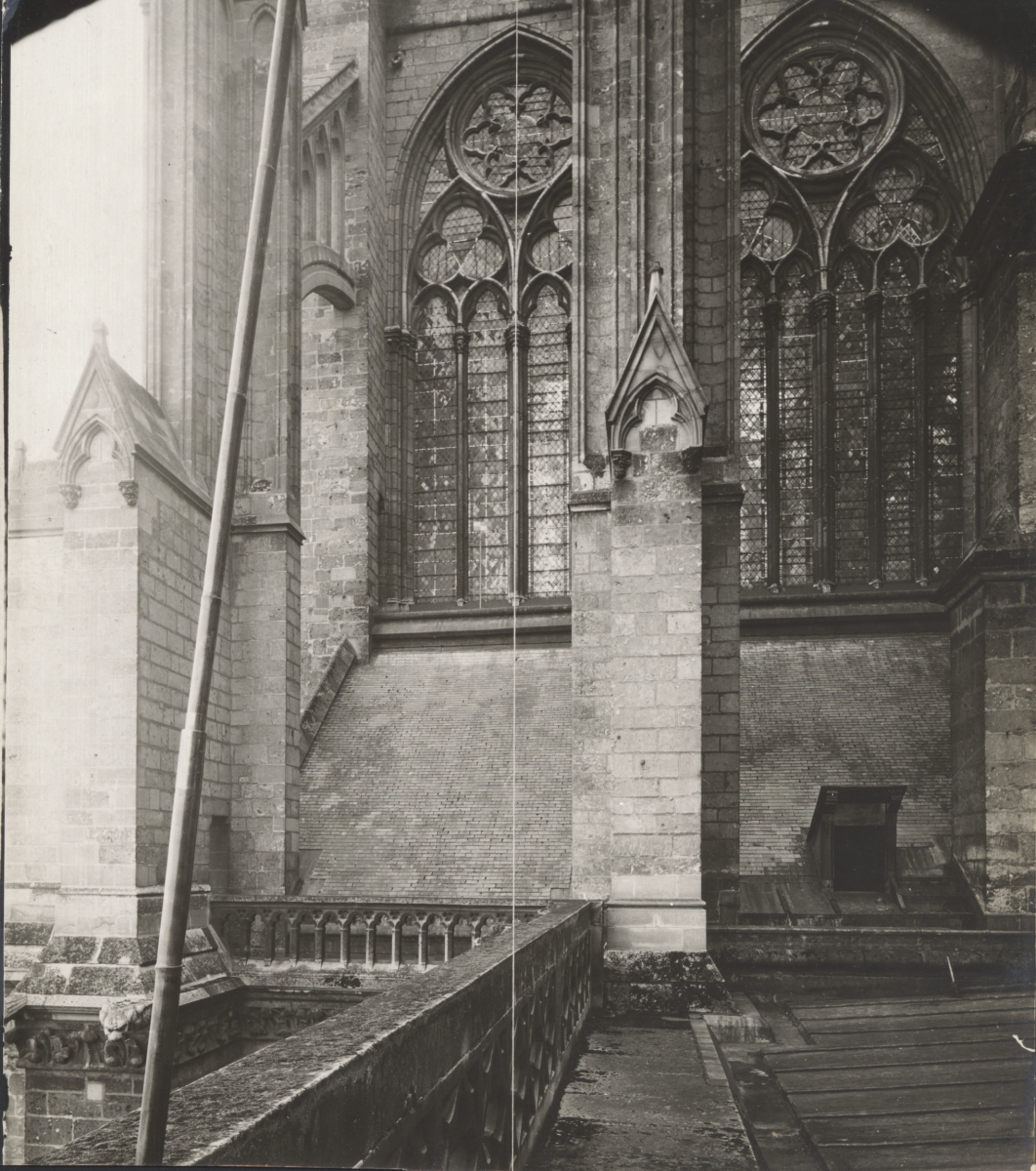

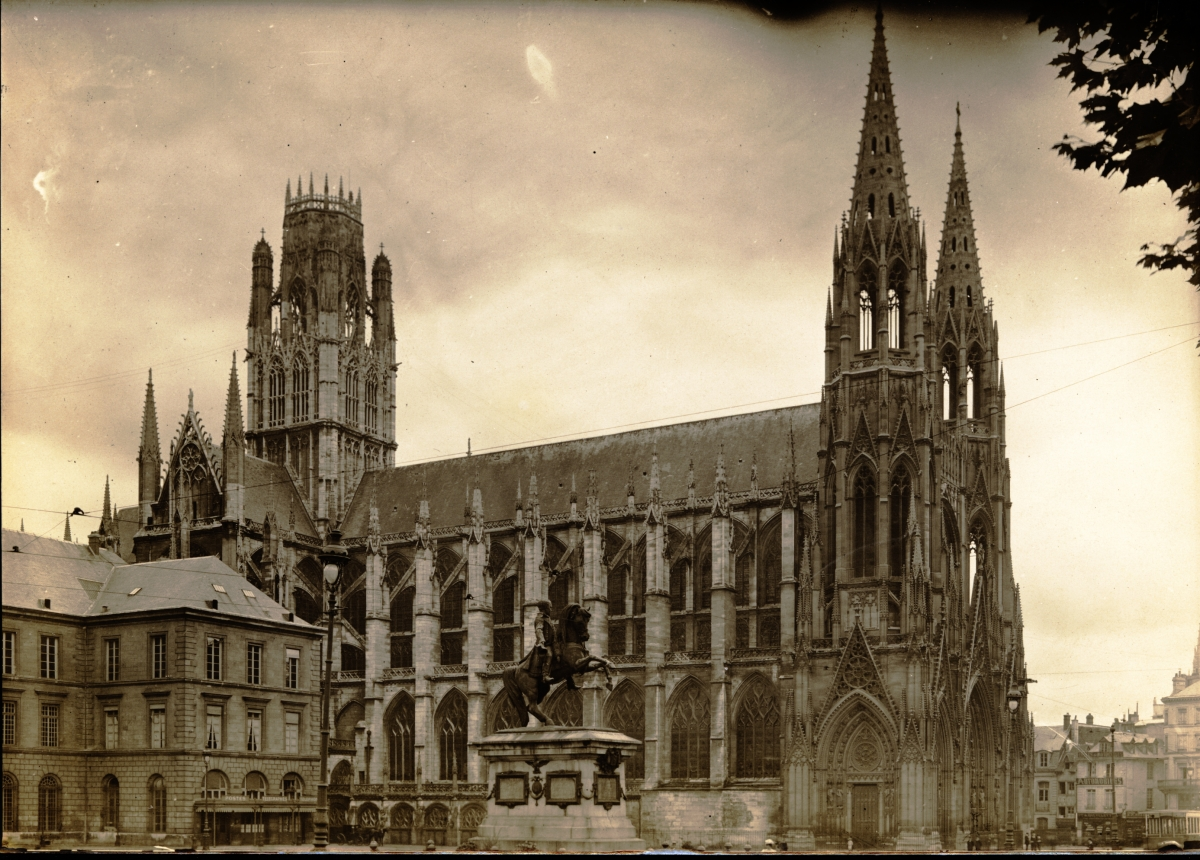

== Organ ==
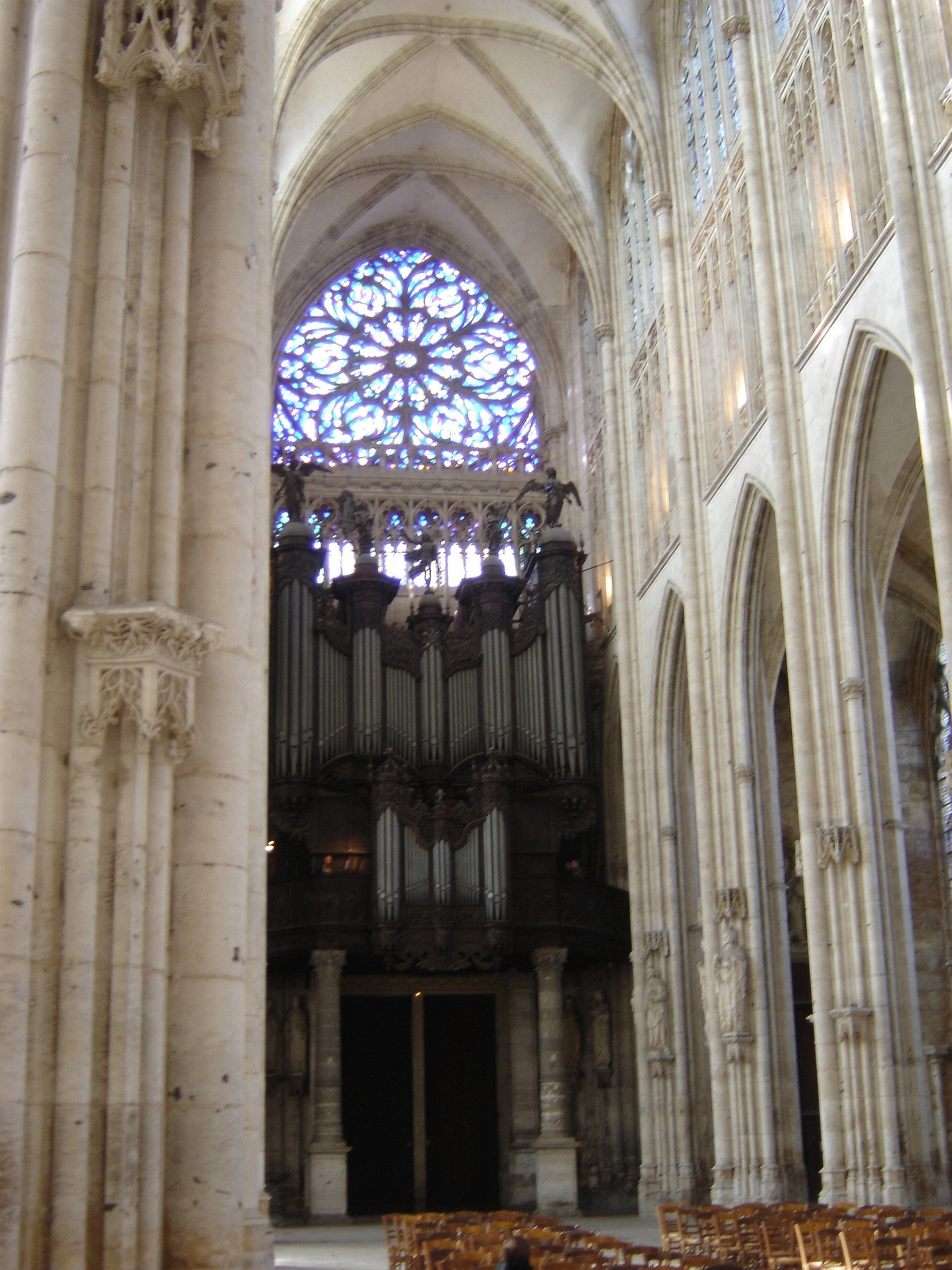
Interior with organ.

The church contains a large four-manual pipe organ built in 1890 by Aristide Cavaillé-Coll. This instrument is considered to be one of the most important organs in France, and is notable for its powerful 32' Contre-Bombarde. The organ stands unaltered and thus is one of the few of his works to speak with its original voice. The organ has been recorded on by many organists.

I Positif
Montre	8'
Bourdon	8'
Gambe	8'
Unda maris	8'
Flûte douce	4'
Dulciane	4'
Doublette	2'
Plein-jeu V	1'
Cor anglais	16'
Trompette	8'
Cromorne	8'
Clairon	4'

II Grand-Orgue
Montre	16'
Violon-basse	16'
Bourdon	16'
Montre	8'
Diapason	8'
Bourdon	8'
Salicional	8'
Flûte harmonique	8'
Prestant	4'
Trompette en chamade	8'
Clairon en chamade	4'

III Récit expressif
Quintaton	16'
Corno dolce	16'
Diapason	8'
Flûte traversière	8'
Cor de nuit	8'
Voix éolienne	8'
Viole de gambe	8'
Voix céleste	8'
Flûte octaviante	4'
Viole d'amour	4'
Quinte	2 2/3'
Octavin	2'
Carillon I-III	1'
Cornet V	8'
Tuba magna	16'
Trompette harmonique	8'
Basson-Hautbois	8'
Clarinette	8'
Voix Humaine	8'
Clairon harmonique	4'
Tremolo

IV Bombarde
Grosse Flûte	8'
Flûte	4'
Doublette	2'
Fourniture V	2 2/3'
Cornet V	16'
Bombarde	16'
Basson	16'
Trompette	8'
Clairon	4'

Pédale
Soubasse	32'
Contre-basse	16'
Soubasse	16'
Basse	8'
Violoncelle	8'
Bourdon	8'
Flûte	4'
Contre-bombarde	32'
Bombarde	16'
Contre-basson	16'
Trompette	8'
Clairon	4'

- Couplers: Tirasse G.O., Tirasse Pos., Tirasse Réc., Appel G.O., Pos./G.O., Réc./G.O., Bomb./G.O., Pos./Réc., Bomb./Réc., Oct. gr. G.O., Oct. gr. Réc./G.O., Oct. gr. Réc., Oct. aiguë Réc., Anches Péd., Anches G.O., Anches Pos., Anches Réc., Anches Bomb., Trémolo Réc., Expression Réc.

== Bibliography ==
- Davis, Michael T. and Linda Elaine Neagley. "Mechanics and Meaning in the Plan Designs of Saint-Urbain, Troyes and Saint-Ouen, Rouen," Gesta 39 (2000): 161-182. https://www.jstor.org/stable/767144
