= Thymerais =

- Natural region
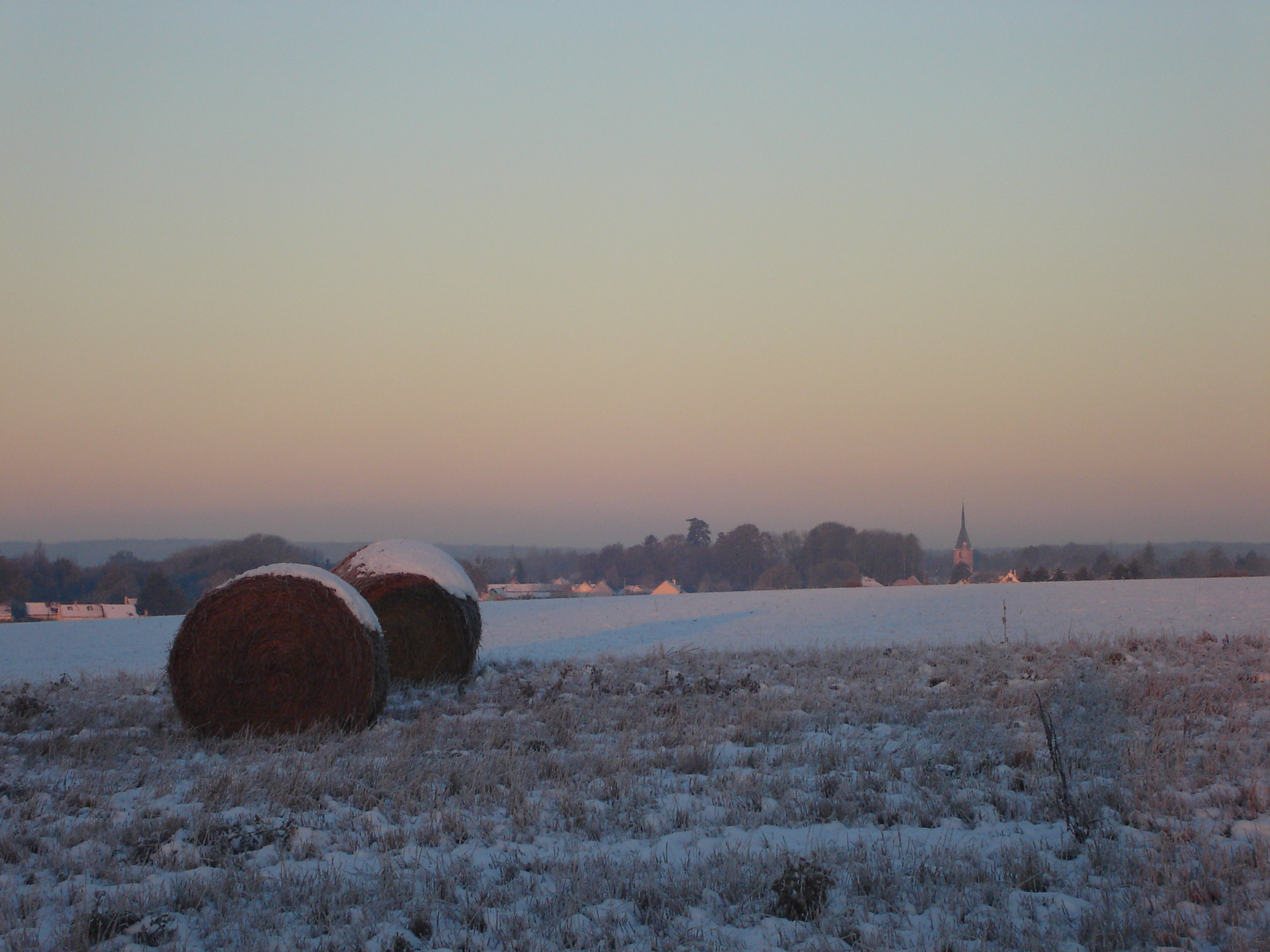
- Thymerais landscape in the winter near Senonches

- A map of the Eure-et-Loir showing the group of Thymerais communes in red
- Country: France

Thymerais (or Thimerais, pronounced [timʁɛ]) is a natural region of Eure-et-Loir, in France, where history and geography meet. Open to influences from Normandy, Drouais, Beauce and Perche, it is a transition zone like the Drouais.

A former country of Perche under the Merovingian dynasty, it took its name from its allegiance to Theodemer, prince of the Merovingian family.

Thymerais is also associated with the barony of Châteauneuf-en-Thymerais whose territory included in the thirteenth century the north-west of the Eure-et-Loir and some villages in Drouais, Eure and Orne, and overflowed the present townships of Courville-sur-Eure and La Loupe.

The name Thymerais was taken in 2003 to designate the district of Thymerais municipalities made of communes belonging to the canton of Châteauneuf-en-Thymerais. Châteauneuf-en-Thymerais and Thimert-Gâtelles are the historic centers of this district.

== Geography ==
Open to influences from the Île-de-France, the Pays chartrain (Chartres region), Normandy and Perche, Thymerais consists of plateaus and valleys cleared in the Middle Ages, forests and ponds. It is a transition zone bounded roughly in the north by the River Avre, which separates the department of Eure, in the south and east by the river Eure, and in the west by the Orne department.

The region, mainly agricultural, is a plateau but has a hilly area covered with forests south and west. These forests, especially those of Châteauneuf-en-Thymerais and Senonches alone represent more than half the area of forest in the Eure-et-Loir. The massive Senonches belongs to the Parc naturel régional du Perche. Its soil is composed of flint suitable for growing grain. The region is also known for its iron.

== Origin ==
Region seems to have long been linked to the natural region of Perche in the sense that a forest area designated Perche known before the sixth century and not to be confused with the political constituencies established on the ancient silva pertica. This error continues to be transmitted since Gilles Bry de la Clergery published his Histoire des pays et comté du Perche in 1620, in which he divided the Perche into four parts:

- The Great Perche, or proper Perche;
- The Perche-Gouet, which merged with the Little Perche;
- The Thimerais, or "Land dismembered";
- The French Lands, so called because they followed the customs of France and not that of Normandy, district which, according to Bry Clergerie, included the Tour grise de Verneuil and was connected to Thimerais.

The Thimerais would then have been born in the Perche as a result of its progressive deforestation for agricultural purposes. The name Thimerais designated the area around the castle Thimert (near Châteauneuf-en-Thymerais). In the Middle Ages, it became part of the barony of Châteauneuf;. It was called "Land dismembered" because, after being joined to the Kingdom of France, it was separated from its royal domain and not, as is often believed, from the province of Perche. In the 16th century, it was parted in favor of Henri de Bourbon (the future Henry IV) and Louis Gonzaga, Duke of Nevers. This corner of earth, as the entire extent between Avre and Eure, was part of silva pertica (in Latin "Perche forest").

The villages of the region have gradually lost their suffix Perche. Châteauneuf adopted the suffix Thymerais to distinguish a city namesake and Verneuil-en-Perche became Verneuil-sur-Avre. Only one village kept the word Perche in its name, providing evidence of the decline in Perche. It is Louvilliers (Canton Brezolles). Named Lovillare in Pertico in an ecclesiastical register (pouillé) in around 1250 and in another in the late 15th century. This village ceased to be registered inside the Perche, and took the name Louvilliers-lès-Perche.

== History ==
The origin of Thymerais goes back to the 7th century, when king Thierry III gave this territory to Theodemer, prince of the Merovingian family. The country was then called Theodemerensis (literally "Theodemer Territory") in his honor, then abbreviated to Themerensis and gallicized to Thymerais or Thimerais. The country was attached to the Kingdom of France in the 12th and 13th centuries.

According to the vicomte de Romanet, the Thymerais territory that was originally part of the counties of Chartres and Dreux, was occupied by powerful independent lords who owed allegiance only to the King of France.

On the religious side, the Thymerais belonged to the diocese of Chartres, on its north-west. It was composed of 14 parishes.

In 1058, Albert Ribaud, lord of Thymerais, took a stand against William the Conqueror, Duke of Normandy and king of England, who seized Thimert and then installed there a governor. The following year, Henry I, King of the Franks, retook the castle and razed it. Not very far, in a clearing in the woods, Gaston, brother of Albert Ribaud, built a fort named Chastel-neuf, which soon was surrounded by a village of the same name, and which became the capital of Thymerais.

From a feudal standpoint, the Thymerais formed in 1200 one great fief with Châteauneuf-en-Thymerais at its center. This fief was divided into two parts, both dependencies of the Crown of France. On one side Châteauneuf, and on the other Senonches and Brezolles, erected later into Senonches county.

In the 18th century, La Ferté-Vidame was distracted from the barony of Châteauneuf-en-Thymerais and attached to the Crown of France, as were those of Maillebois and Blévy; thus, until the late 18th century, the barony of Châteauneuf-en-Thymerais was far from having the same extent it had in the 13th century. Also, instead of being a single fief, the Thymerais was composed of four: the barony of Châteauneuf, the county of Senonches, the marquisat of Maillebois and the county of La Ferté-Vidame.

In financial and administrative terms, the Thimerais was part of Verneuil-sur-Avre, included in the Généralité of Alençon, and divided into four subdivisions (Thimerais addition, still included eight parishes in the province of Perche since the abolition of the election Longny-au-Perche in 1080 and a number of the Norman parishes).

In military terms, the Thimerais was part of the government of the Île de France and there was in Châteauneuf a constabulary and archers.
