= De obitu Willelmi =

Latin manuscript

The De obitu Willelmi ('On the death of King William') is a short Latin text connected with, but independent of, William of Jumièges's Gesta Normannorum Ducum. Surviving in full in just one manuscript, it describes the death of William the Conqueror, King of England and Duke of Normandy, though it does so in ways heavily influenced by literary traditions, notably those created by Einhard's Life of Charlemagne and the Vita Hludovici by the so-called Astronomer. It has been suggested that it was written to delegitimise one of William's sons, Robert Curthose. The text is translated into English by R. Allen Brown, in The Norman Conquest (1984), pp. 47–9.
