= Senonches =

- Commune
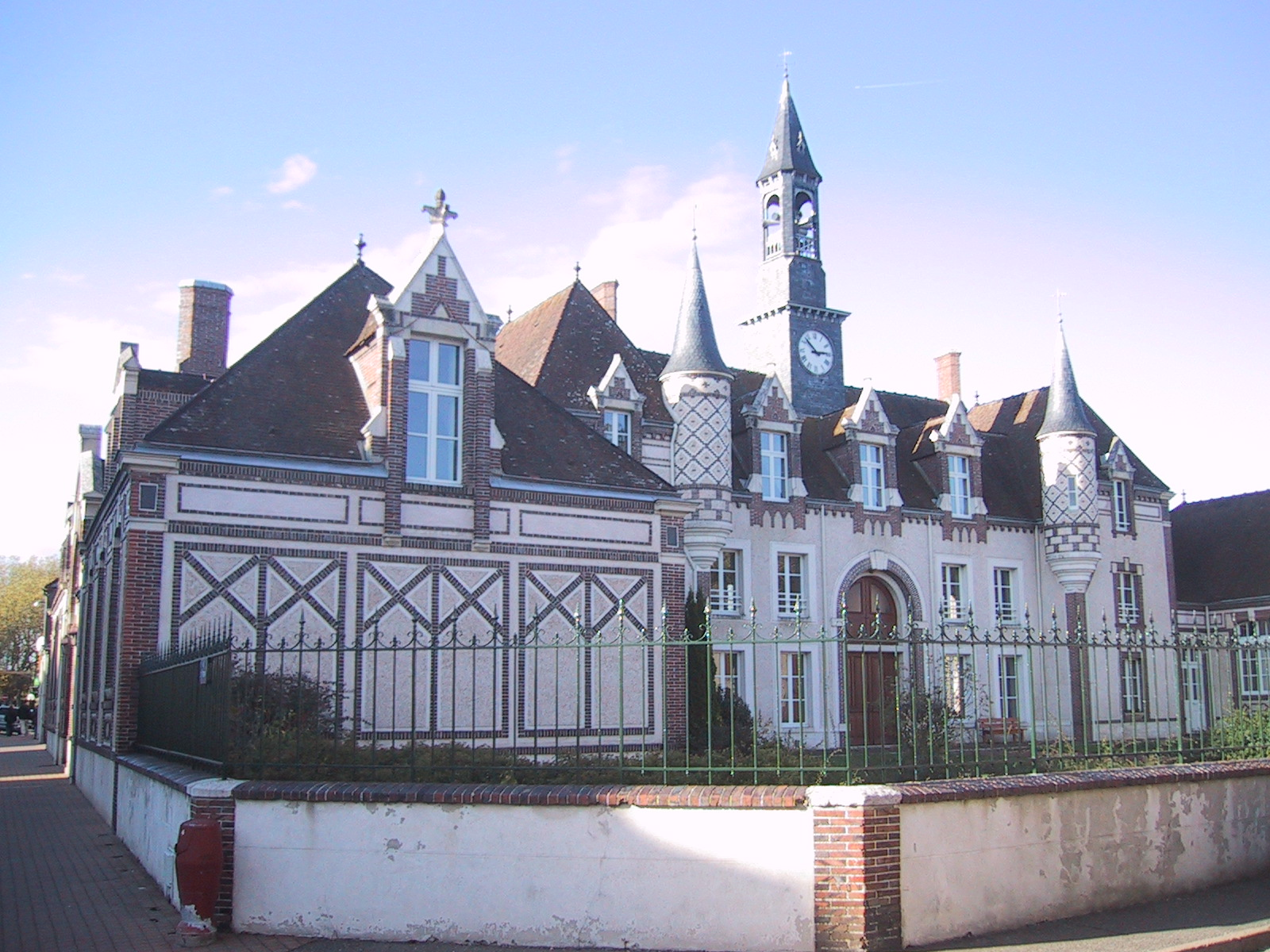
- The town hall in Senonches

- Coat of arms
- Location of Senonches
- Location within France Location within Centre-Val de Loire
- Coordinates: 48°33′44″N 1°01′53″E
- Country: France
- Region: Centre-Val de Loire
- Department: Eure-et-Loir
- Arrondissement: Dreux
- Canton: Saint-Lubin-des-Joncherets

Government
  - Mayor (2020–2026): Xavier Nicolas
- Area^{1}: 62.48 km^{2} (24.12 sq mi)
- Highest elevation: 278 m (912 ft)
- Lowest elevation: 183 m (600 ft)
- Population (2023): 3,045
  - Density: 48.74/km^{2} (126.2/sq mi)
- Demonym: Senonchois·e
- Time zone: UTC+01:00 (CET)
  - Summer (DST): UTC+02:00 (CEST)
- INSEE/Postal code: 28373 /28250
- Website: http://www.senonches.com/
- ^{1} French Land Register data, which excludes lakes, ponds, glaciers > 1 km^{2} (0.386 sq mi or 247 acres) and river estuaries.

Senonches (French pronunciation: [sənɔ̃ʃ]) is a commune in Eure-et-Loir, Centre-Val de Loire, France. In 1973 it absorbed two former communes: Tardais and La Ville-aux-Nonains.

== Geography ==
Senonches is located northwest of the department of Eure-et-Loir and the northeastern boundary of the Regional Natural Park of the Perche, at a crossroads between the towns of Verneuil-sur-Avre (22 km), Mortagne-au-Perche (41 km), Nogent-le-Rotrou (33 km), Chartres (37 km) and Dreux (38 km). With 4,287 hectares, the forest of Senonches is the largest department, and one of the largest woods in France. It is much rich in plant species and shrubs. The country is also known for its springs and groundwater (in the forest) that supply a portion of the water distributed in Paris and is captured in Rueil-la-Gadelière.

The Commune along with another 70 communes shares part of a 47,681 hectare, Natura 2000 conservation area, called the Forêts et étangs du Perche.

== Tourism ==
Senonches is surrounded by a vast forest (the largest in the department), formed mainly by oaks and beech, these remarkable trees can be explored on foot or by bike, including the "oak chair" and the "three brothers." The castle under renovation since 2003, will be reopened in Spring of 2012. Its tower dungeon made of a ferruginous stone, typical of the region, is very curious for most visitors.

== Others ==
There is a market every Friday in the city center with many marketers. The Senonches Dreux airport, a NATO base, where fighters and bombers can take off (this base was turned into a photovoltaic solar plant in 2012).

== Population ==
Historical population

Year	Pop.	±% p.a.
1800	1,836	—
1831	1,980	+0.24%
1851	2,108	+0.31%
1901	1,983	−0.12%
1911	1,828	−0.81%
1921	1,610	−1.26%
1936	1,683	+0.30%
1946	1,943	+1.45%
1954	2,062	+0.75%
1962	2,619	+3.03%

Year	Pop.	±% p.a.
1968	2,972	+2.13%
1975	3,466	+2.22%
1982	3,407	−0.24%
1990	3,171	−0.89%
1999	3,143	−0.10%
2007	3,262	+0.47%
2012	3,136	−0.78%
2017	3,087	−0.31%
2023	3,045	−0.23%

Source: EHESS and INSEE (1968-2023)

== See also ==
- Natural region of Thymerais
- Communes of the Eure-et-Loir department
- Perche
