= Châteauneuf-en-Thymerais =

- Commune
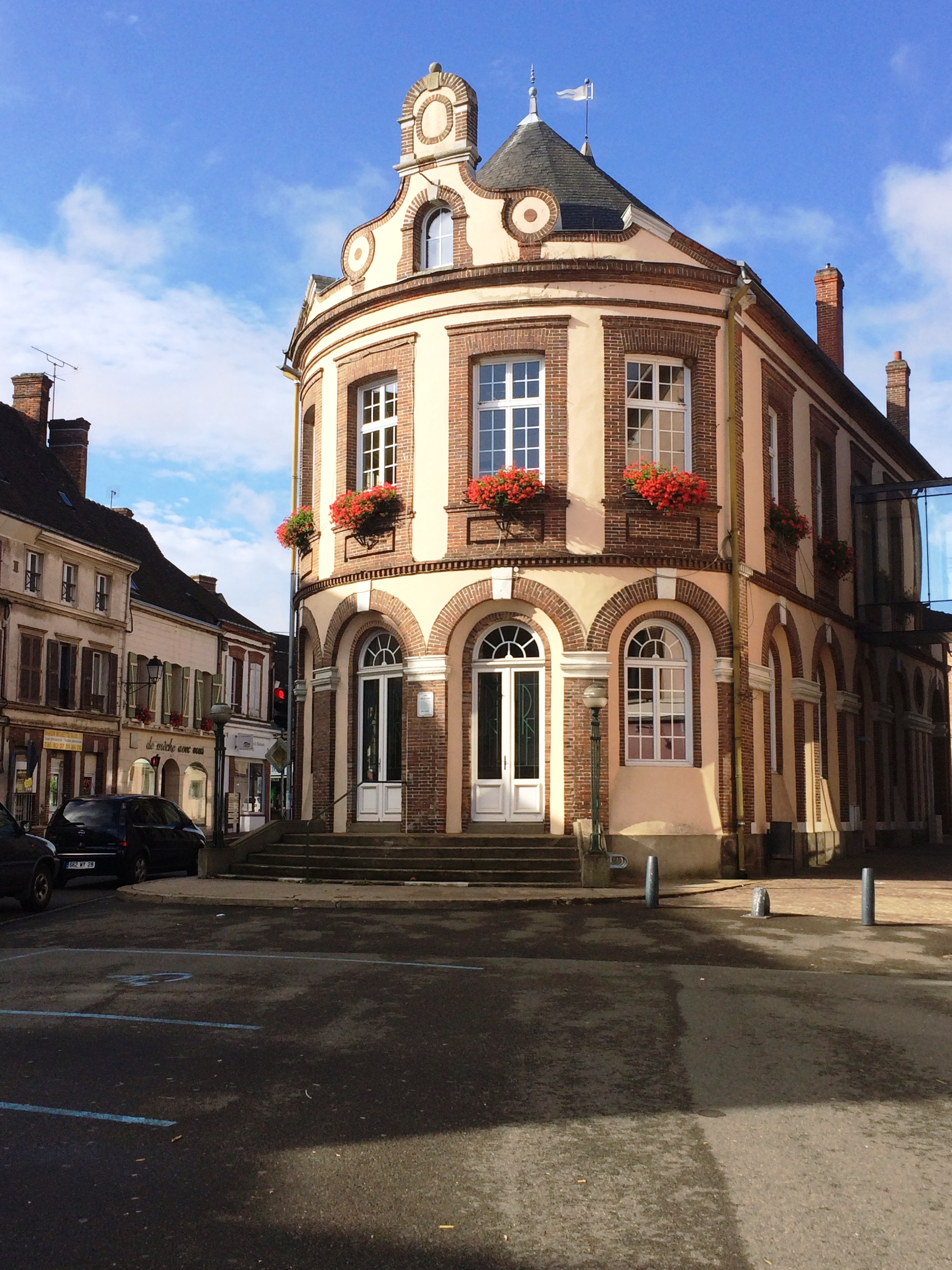
- The town hall in Châteauneuf-en-Thymerais

- Coat of arms
- Location of Châteauneuf-en-Thymerais
- Location within France Location within Centre-Val de Loire
- Coordinates: 48°34′53″N 1°14′31″E
- Country: France
- Region: Centre-Val de Loire
- Department: Eure-et-Loir
- Arrondissement: Dreux
- Canton: Saint-Lubin-des-Joncherets
- Intercommunality: CA Pays de Dreux

Government
  - Mayor (2020–2026): Jean-Louis Raffin
- Area^{1}: 4.07 km^{2} (1.57 sq mi)
- Elevation: 209 m (686 ft)
- Highest elevation: 223 m (732 ft)
- Lowest elevation: 183 m (600 ft)
- Population (2023): 2,641
  - Density: 649/km^{2} (1,680/sq mi)
- Time zone: UTC+01:00 (CET)
  - Summer (DST): UTC+02:00 (CEST)
- INSEE/Postal code: 28089 /28170
- ^{1} French Land Register data, which excludes lakes, ponds, glaciers > 1 km^{2} (0.386 sq mi or 247 acres) and river estuaries.

Châteauneuf-en-Thymerais (French pronunciation: [ʃɑtonœf ɑ̃ timʁɛ]) is a commune in Eure-et-Loir department in northern France.

The commune was once an important stronghold reigning over the whole natural and historic province of Thymerais.

Born of the fierce determination of its first lords to face the threat brought by the Duke of Normandy upon the Kingdom of France, and devastated and much fought over through the ages, the castle that rose out of it was eventually demolished, but the city remained. It gradually lost its importance and a dynastic feud was the center of which it was dismembered, so that it became a barony in the eighteenth century, although it was far from having the same extent that it did in the thirteenth century.

The city known since the end of the Second World War subsequently went through a fragile revival by taking advantage of its location due to its proximity to Paris, and the employment areas of Chartres and Dreux. It managed to attract some industrial enterprises to retain part of its business while achieving a low but steady demographic development. Already a head of its Canton, belonging to the Drouais region, the city became in 2003 the center of the Community of communes of Thymerais.

== Geography ==
Former capital of Thymerais having taken over this status from its neighbor Thimert, Châteauneuf-en-Thymerais is located south of Normandy and Drouais, west and north of the Beauce and Chartrain and east of the Perche . The city was built following the vicissitudes of history in a forested area called, around 600 or even at a much earlier period, the Perche. This designation did not yet apply at the early eleventh century to the political or administrative divisions. However, the woodland region of the Perche was divided between the County of Corbon (Mortagne), the Barony of Châteauneuf, the county and bishopric of Chartres, the Viscounty of Châteaudun and County of Vendôme. Progressive clearing of this forest caused the retreat of the Perche, giving place to the Thymerais. A crossroads, the town is now the headquarters of the canton and the center of the community of communes of the Thymerais.

The Commune along with another 70 communes shares part of a 47,681 hectare, Natura 2000 conservation area, called the Forêts et étangs du Perche.

== History ==
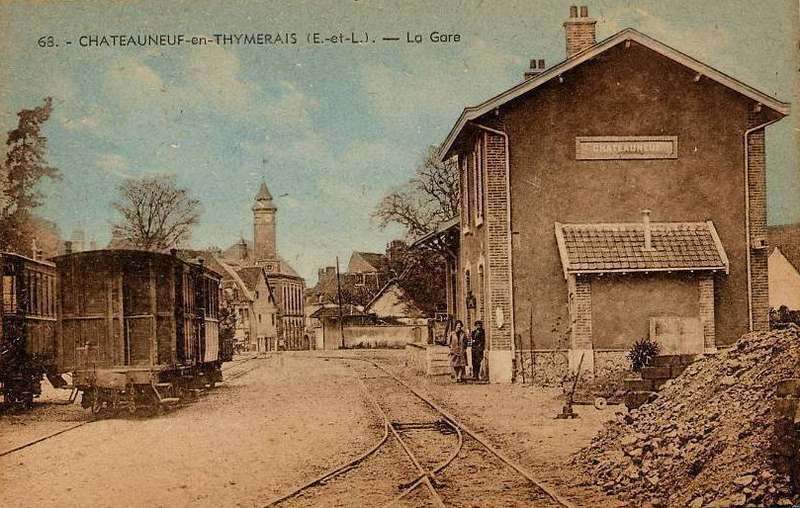
1910 Foucault à Dreux postcard depicting Châteauneuf-en-Thymerais

In 1058, Albert Ribaud, lord of Thymerais, took a stand against William the Conqueror, Duke of Normandy and future king of England, the latter seized Thimert and left there a governor, but the following year, Henry I King of France, took the castle and razed it. It was reconstructed by Gaston, brother of Albert Ribaud built a short distance in a clearing in the woods, a fort named Chastel-neuf. It was formed around a village of the same name, which soon became the capital of Thymerais.

From a feudal standpoint, in 1200 the Thymerais formed one great fief whose center was Châteauneuf-en-thymerais. The Châtellerie of Châteauneuf-en-Thymerais covered an area roughly bounded by the north by the river Avre and by the river Eure to the south and east. The Châtellainie covered more than 80 villages within these limits but also villages in Eure: Acon, Armentieres-sur-Avre in Saint-Martin-du-Vieux-Verneuil, Saint-Victor-sur-Avre, and the Department of Orne: Charencey, Moussonvilliers, Normandel and La Trinite-sur-Avre, all in the Township of Tourouvre.

Hughes who married Mabile, daughter of Roger de Montgomery and Mabile de Bellême, gave asylum to Robert Courteheuse, who had rebelled against his father after a quarrel with his brothers and the failure to take the Castle of Rouen. William the Conqueror responded in 1078, besieging the stronghold of Regmalard, which eventually surrendered. He was accompanied by Rotrou III, Count of Perche, Count of Mortagne, lord of Regmalard.

The castle was sacked in 1169 by King Henry I of England, following the destruction of Chennebrun, located on the left bank of the Avre the previous year by the King of France. The castle was again attacked by Henry II of England, who burned the fortress, but it was rebuilt in 1189 by Hughes III du Chatel, lord of Thymerais. Hughes III received the castle from King Louis VII of France on the occasion of the inauguration of the fair of Saint-Jacques Boutaincourt. St. Thomas Chapel was built at that time in the suburbs of the town (now St. Thomas Road between Chartres and Nogent-le-Roi). Closed for worship since the French Revolution, it was built in honor of St. Thomas Becket, Archbishop of Canterbury.

In 1269, King Louis IX of France or St. Louis, came to Thimert and went to the castle of Châteauneuf. At that time, a major exhibition was held under the patronage of Saint-Arnoult, held in July in a suburb of the city, near Grande Noé.

Châteauneuf was elevated in 1314 to the peerage as a barony-vassal of the Kingdom of France, directly under the authority of the Tower of the Louvre. The barony was then composed of four castellanies: Châteauneuf, Brezolles, Senonches and Champrond en Gâtine. The lordship of Champrond en Gastine was acquired in June 1310 by Charles I, Count of Alençon and Perche, through an exchange with Enguerrand de Marigny, the king's chamberlain, and Havis de Mons, his wife, who held it for Gaucher de Chatillon, Comte de Ponthieu. The barony of Châteauneuf-en-Thimerais stayed a part of the County and later Duchy of Alençon until its extinction in 1525 with Charles IV of Alençon.

During the Hundred Years War, the Bourguignons, under the command of Maréchal de Longny took the city. Recovering thereafter, it was again captured by Warwick in 1418, and Henry V of England installed there one of his lieutenants. The city was finally taken back by Jean II, Duke of Alençon after the battle of Verdun in 1424.

Later, Henry IV of France would establish a bailliage in the early seventeenth century.

In August 1449, King Charles VII of France came to Châteauneuf and stayed three days at the castle.

On the death of Charles IV of Alençon in 1525, the king seized their land, most of which had been given to its prerogative and ancestors had, for lack of male descendants, returned to the Crown under the law of appendages. But the barony of Châteauneuf was not part of the prerogative of the Duc d'Alençon. Count Charles II of Alençon had inherited one third of the barony from his brother Louis, Count of Chartres, by sharing it in 1335. Pierre II of Alençon later acquired the other two thirds in 1370. Champrond finally was acquired by Charles, in 1310. Later the two sisters of the Duke Charles, Françoise of Alençon, wife of Charles IV de Bourbon, duke of Vendome, and Anne of Alençon, Marquise of Montferrat, opposed the seizure by the king of the assets of their brother. There followed a trial that was not completed until 1563 by a double transaction between King Charles IX of France and the descendants of Anne and Françoise d'Alençon, which ended with the king accepting their claims and restoring the barony of Châteauneuf-in-Thimerais. This was divided among the heirs of Françoise d'Alençon, who took Champrond and Châteauneuf and Louis de Gonzague, grandson of Anne of Alençon, Marquise of Montferrat (now the same year by the Duke of Nivernais marriage with Henriette of Cleves) received the cities, towns and castellanies Senonches and Brezolles en Thimerais which were detached from the barony of Châteauneuf. In February 1500 King Charles IX had erected the lordships of Brezolles Senonches, sold in his name to the principality of Mantua, in favor of Louis de Gonzague, father of Charles and were erected into a principality under the name of Mantua.

In 1591, the Comte de Soissons, plundered the castle along with those of Arpentigny and La Ferte-Vidame.

The castle was never rebuilt and returned to the royal domain. Châteauneuf was annexed and the lords resided at Maillebois until about the second half of the eighteenth century. The stronghold of Thymerais meanwhile gradually was dismantled so that by the late eighteenth century the barony of Châteauneuf-en-Thymerais was nowhere near the same extent as it was in the thirteenth century.

In the late eighteenth century Châteauneuf was dependent on the election of Verneuil-sur-Avre and generality of Alençon.

It was the chief town of the district from 1790 to 1795, and took the name of Puy-la-Montagne to the revolutionary era.

The last traces of the castle moat, were gradually filled during the nineteenth century. The last traces of them were erased in the first half of the twentieth century to make way for new roads (including the streets of Pont Tabarin, Petite Friche, and Dulorens).

In the twentieth century the city suffered through bombardment in 1940 during the Battle of France. When the war was over, Châteauneuf saw the arrival of families of U.S. soldiers housed in a subdivision south of the city and many people worked on the U.S. air base south of Crucey Brezolles. They left in 1966 upon the withdrawal of French forces from the NATO Command, as decided by De Gaulle, in effect expelling all U.S. bases from the country.

== Population ==
Historical population

Year	Pop.	±% p.a.
1793	1,168	—
1800	1,271	+1.21%
1806	1,250	−0.28%
1821	1,230	−0.11%
1831	1,231	+0.01%
1836	1,156	−1.25%
1841	1,352	+3.18%
1846	1,418	+0.96%
1851	1,435	+0.24%
1856	1,504	+0.94%
1861	1,467	−0.50%
1866	1,489	+0.30%
1872	1,423	−0.75%
1876	1,517	+1.61%
1881	1,455	−0.83%
1886	1,490	+0.48%
1891	1,400	−1.24%
1896	1,361	−0.56%
1901	1,326	−0.52%

Year	Pop.	±% p.a.
1906	1,331	+0.08%
1911	1,335	+0.06%
1921	1,276	−0.45%
1926	1,240	−0.57%
1931	1,379	+2.15%
1936	1,393	+0.20%
1946	1,479	+0.60%
1954	1,529	+0.42%
1962	1,968	+3.21%
1968	2,081	+0.93%
1975	2,248	+1.11%
1982	2,338	+0.56%
1990	2,459	+0.63%
1999	2,423	−0.16%
2007	2,535	+0.57%
2012	2,629	+0.73%
2017	2,619	−0.08%
2023	2,641	+0.14%

Source: EHESS and INSEE (1968-2023)

== See also ==
- Natural region of Thymerais
- Communes of the Eure-et-Loir department
- Perche
