= Siege of Thimert =

Military action in the war between King Henry I of France and Duke William II of Normandy

The siege of Thimert (1058–60) was the last military action in the war between King Henry I of France and Duke William the Bastard of Normandy.

In the first half of 1058, William captured the French fortress at Thimert in the County of Dreux. According to Orderic Vitalis, this was about the same time he took Tillières, a Norman fortress that had been seized by Henry in 1040. Sometime between 29 June and 15 August 1058, Henry personally laid siege to Thimert. The siege dragged on into the next year. Several royal charters are dated by the siege, indicating Henry's continued presence there. He was joined in 1058 by his powerful vassal Count Ralph IV of Valois, and briefly in 1059 by the recalcitrant Count Theobald III of Blois.

By 23 May 1059, when Henry's son Philip was consecrated as joint king with his father, negotiations for a truce had been opened. King Henry sent Bishops Humbert of Paris and Guy of Amiens to seek terms in Normandy. Around the same time, Duke William and many of his leading men were in Dreux, only about twelve miles from Thimert. It is possible that a meeting between king and duke took place at Dreux. All efforts at negotiations failed and the siege was ongoing when Henry died on 4 August 1060. His death brought peace. Thimert was surrendered to the king and razed, while the Normans retained Tillières. A new castle, Châteauneuf-en-Thymerais, was built nearby in 1061.
