= Thimert-Gâtelles =

- Commune
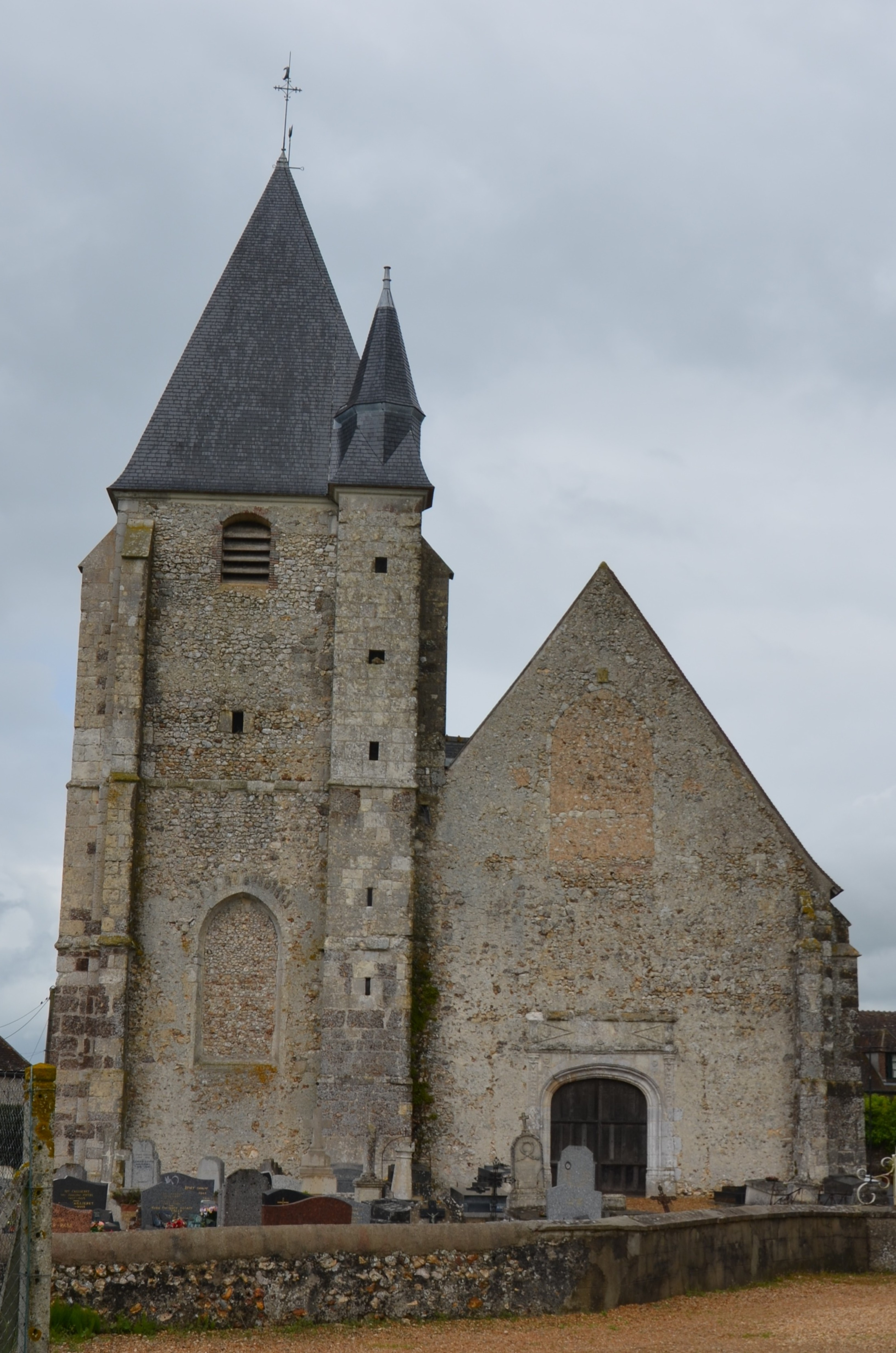
- The church in Thimert-Gâtelles
- Location of Thimert-Gâtelles
- Location within France Location within Centre-Val de Loire
- Coordinates: 48°34′12″N 1°15′08″E
- Country: France
- Region: Centre-Val de Loire
- Department: Eure-et-Loir
- Arrondissement: Dreux
- Canton: Saint-Lubin-des-Joncherets
- Intercommunality: CA Pays de Dreux

Government
  - Mayor (2020–2026): Pascal Guerrier
- Area^{1}: 42.67 km^{2} (16.47 sq mi)
- Elevation: 200 m (660 ft)
- Highest elevation: 254 m (833 ft)
- Lowest elevation: 174 m (571 ft)
- Population (2023): 1,231
  - Density: 28.85/km^{2} (74.72/sq mi)
- Time zone: UTC+01:00 (CET)
  - Summer (DST): UTC+02:00 (CEST)
- INSEE/Postal code: 28386 /28170
- ^{1} French Land Register data, which excludes lakes, ponds, glaciers > 1 km^{2} (0.386 sq mi or 247 acres) and river estuaries.

Thimert-Gâtelles (French pronunciation: [timɛʁ ɡatɛl]) is a commune in the Eure-et-Loir department in northern France.

It was the site of a royal castle until 1058, when it was taken by the Normans. Between 1058 and 1060, it was besieged by the king of France. After that the castle was razed and a new castle built nearby, giving rise to Châteauneuf-en-Thymerais.

== Geography ==
In addition the Commune along with another 70 communes shares part of a 47,681 hectare, Natura 2000 conservation area, called the Forêts et étangs du Perche.

== Population ==
Historical population
Year	Pop.	±% p.a.
1968	786	—
1975	815	+0.52%
1982	826	+0.19%
1990	841	+0.23%
1999	929	+1.11%
2007	1,068	+1.76%
2012	1,209	+2.51%
2017	1,256	+0.77%
2023	1,231	−0.33%
Source: INSEE

== See also ==
- Communes of the Eure-et-Loir department
