= Equestrian statue of William the Conqueror =

Monument in Falaise, Calvados, France

Statue of William the Conqueror
- Statue de Guillaume le Conquérant
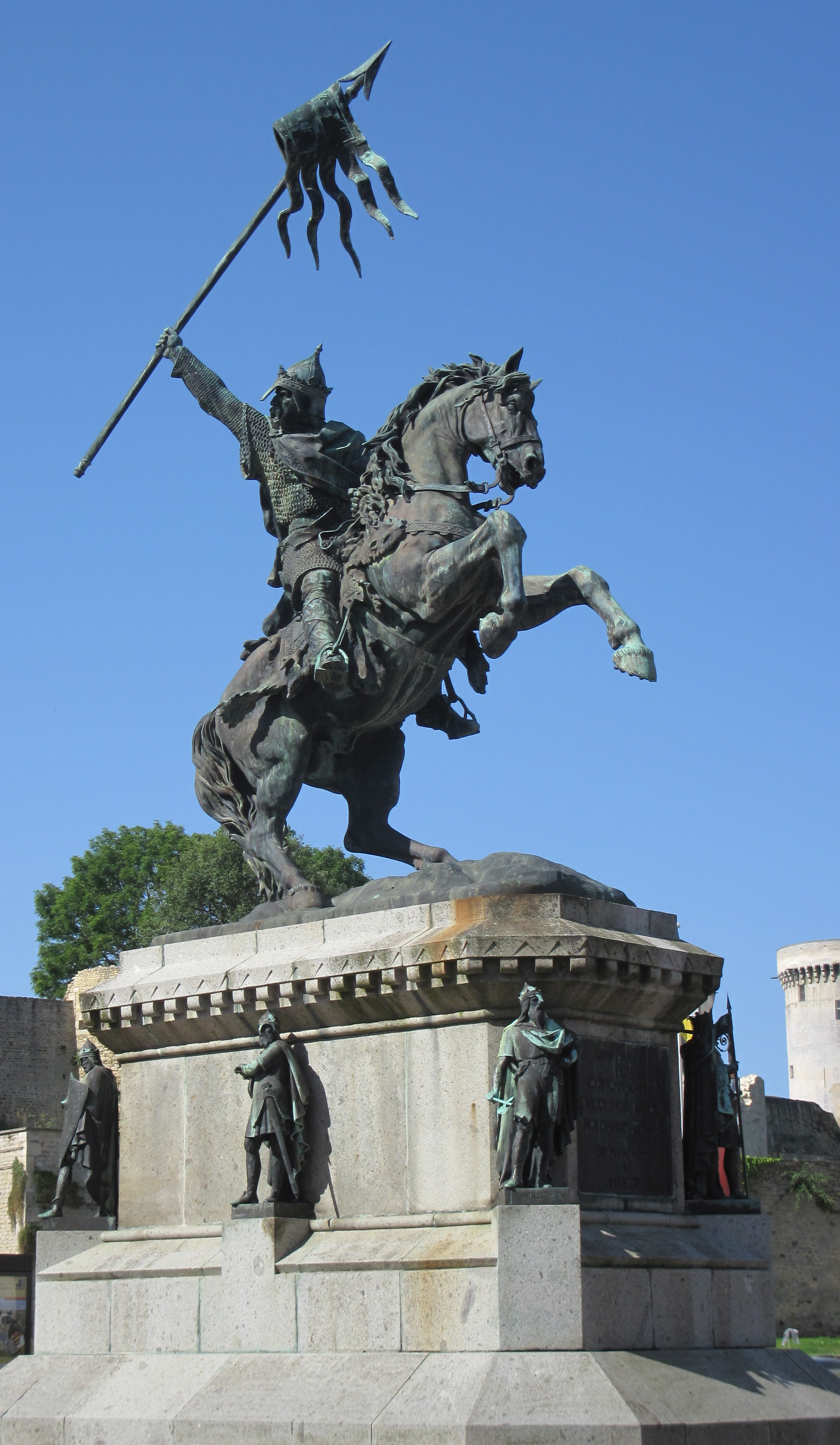
- Statue of William the Conqueror in Falaise
- Interactive map of Statue of William the Conqueror
- Location: Normandy
- Coordinates: 48.8940°N 0.2018°W
- Designer: Louis Rochet
- Type: Statue
- Material: Bronze, granite
- Beginning date: 1851
- Completion date: 1875

The statue of William the Conqueror is located in his birthplace, Falaise, Calvados, about 30 kilometres (19 miles) southeast of Caen, France. It depicts William the Conqueror, Duke of Normandy and King of England, on a horse, and is surrounded by statues of his six ducal predecessors. It is the work of the French sculptor Louis Rochet.

== Description ==
The monument is a bronze statue on a granite pedestal. Surrounding the pedestal are six other statues representing the first six dukes of Normandy: Rollo, William I, Richard I, Richard II, Richard III, and Robert I. There is also a commemorative plaque.

William carries a gonfalon (banner) donated by Pope Alexander II. The sculptor, in order to make the work appear realistic, based his design on the Bayeux Tapestry.

Created with the help of a national subscription, it was unveiled on October 26, 1851. The six other statues are a later addition of September 19, 1875.

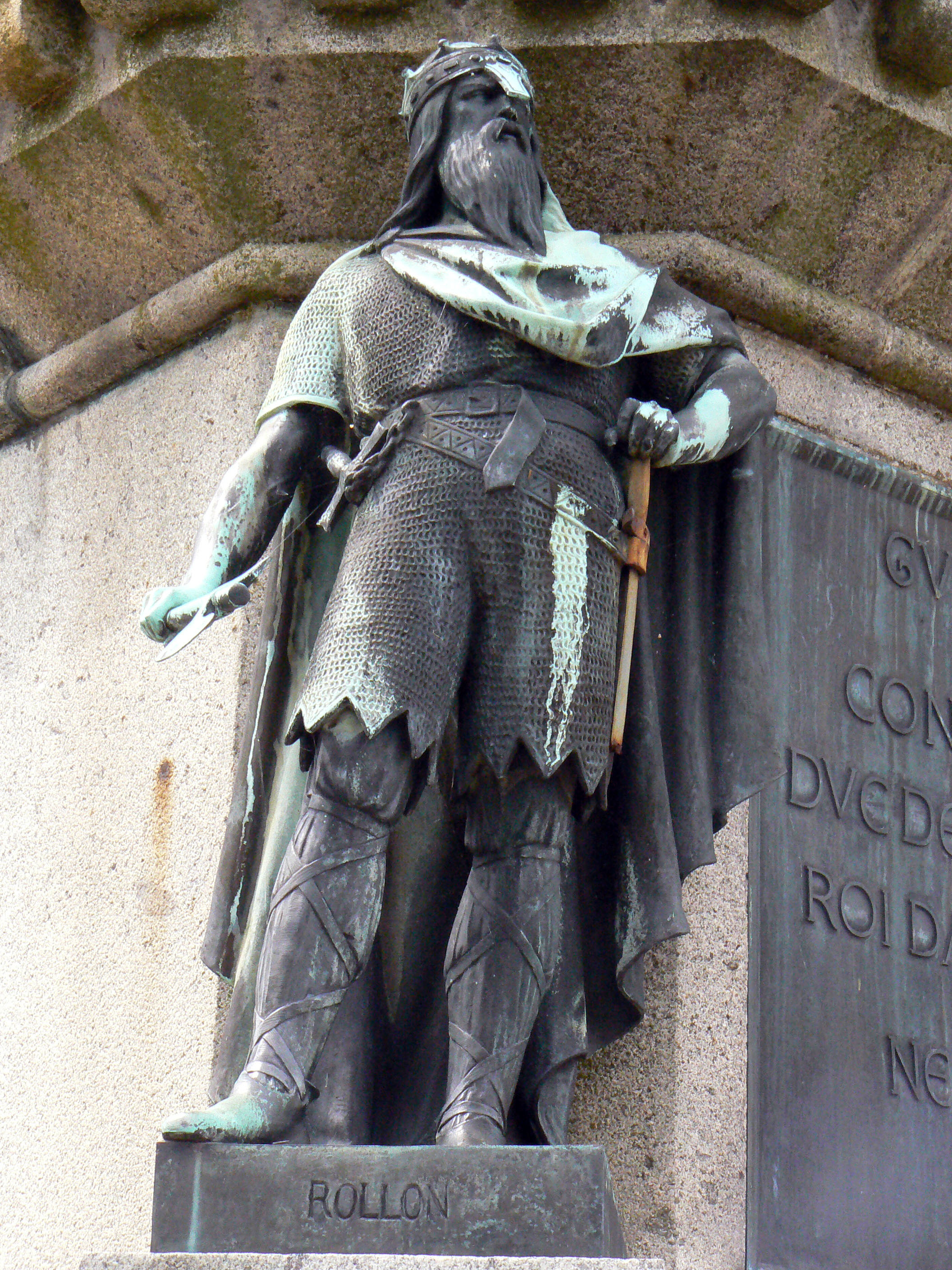
Rollo

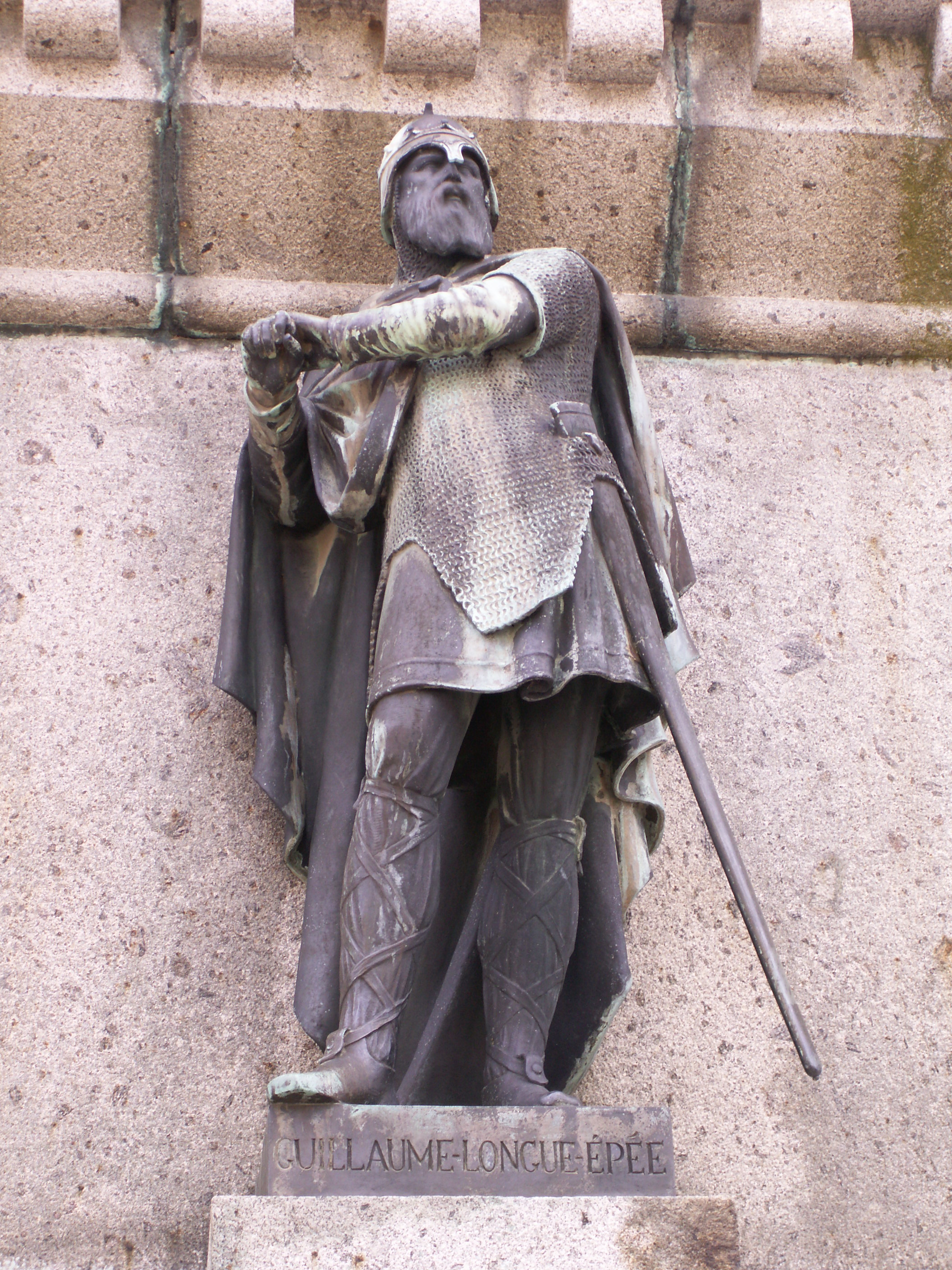
William I

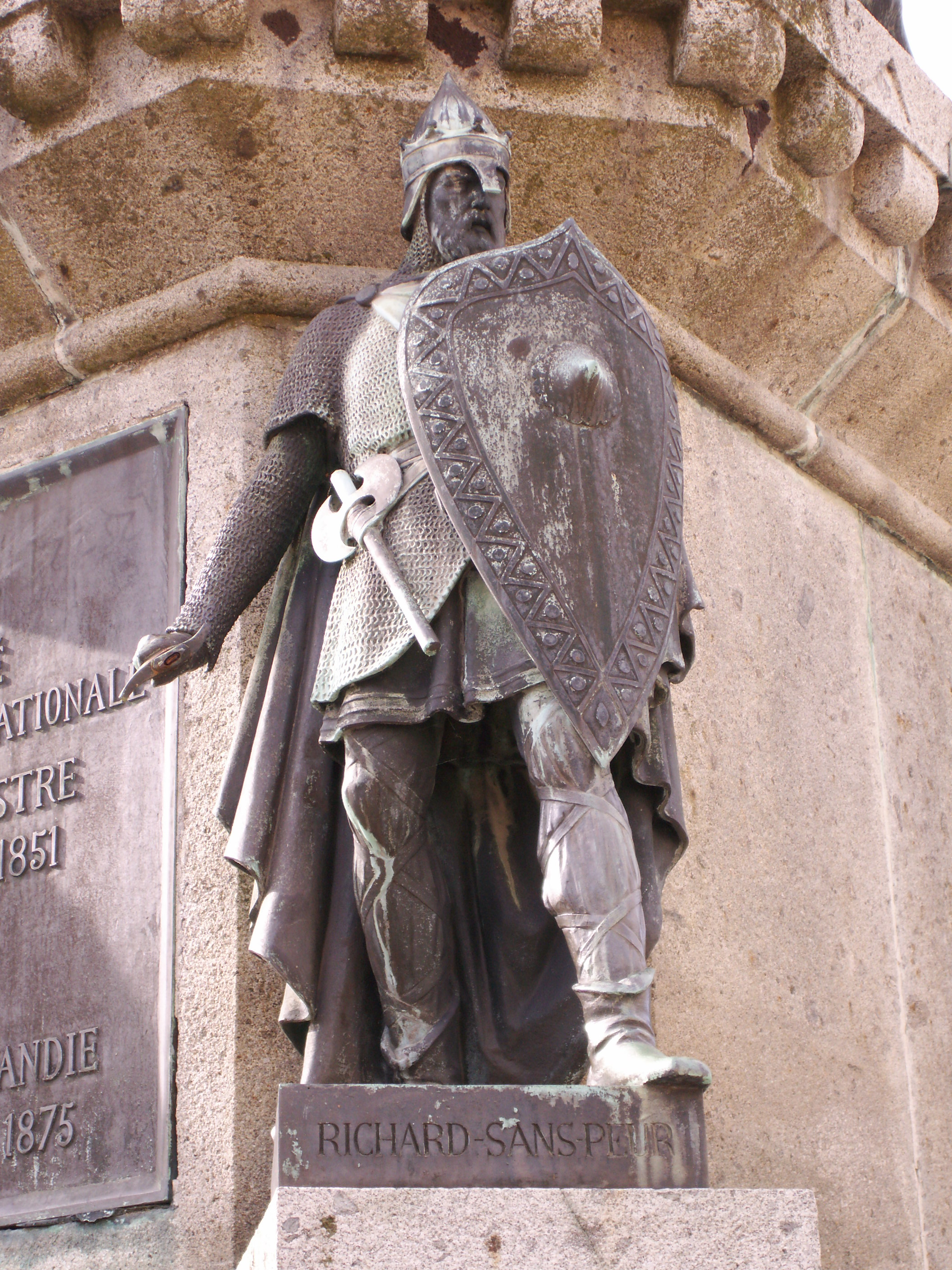
Richard I

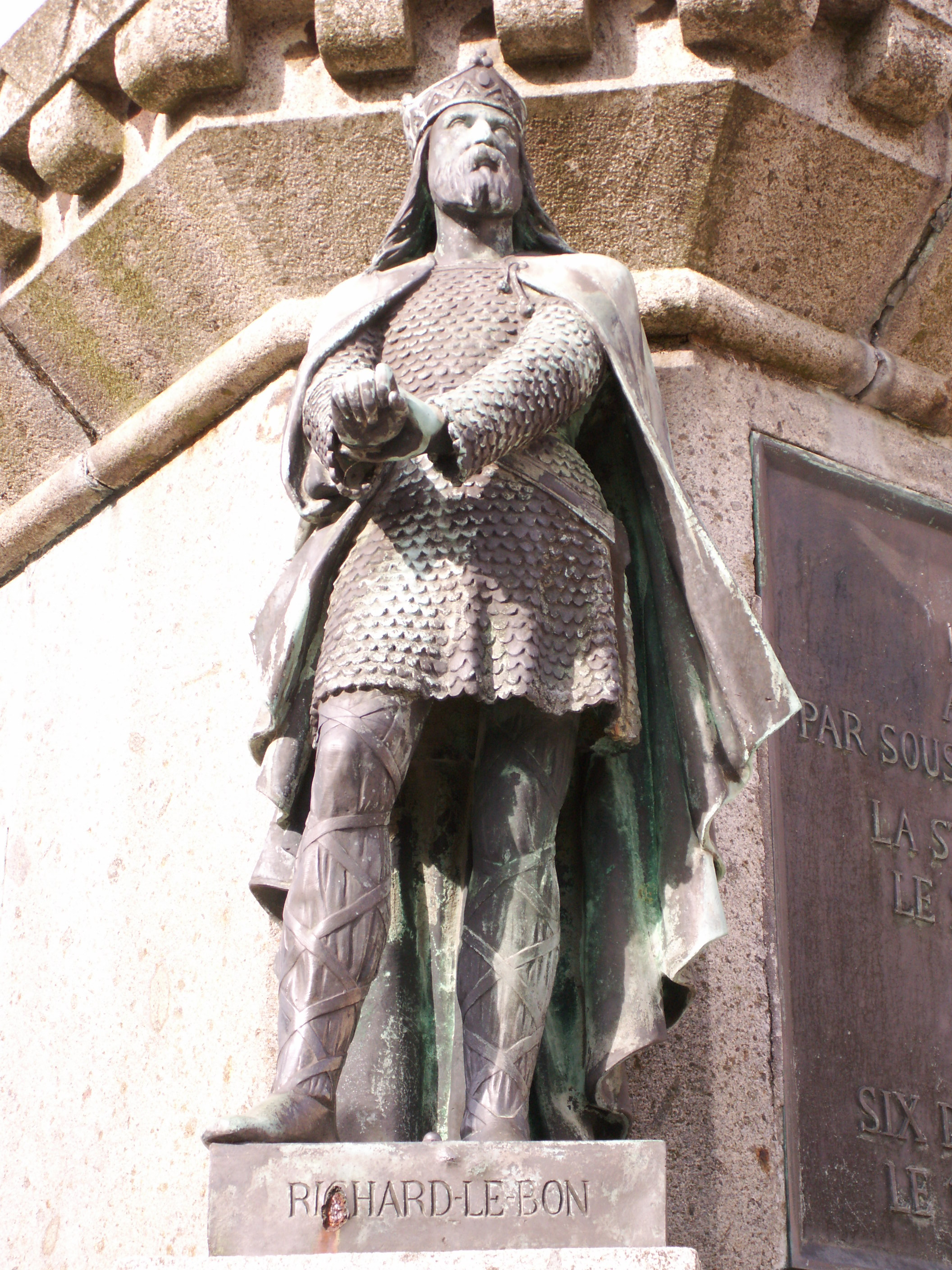
Richard II

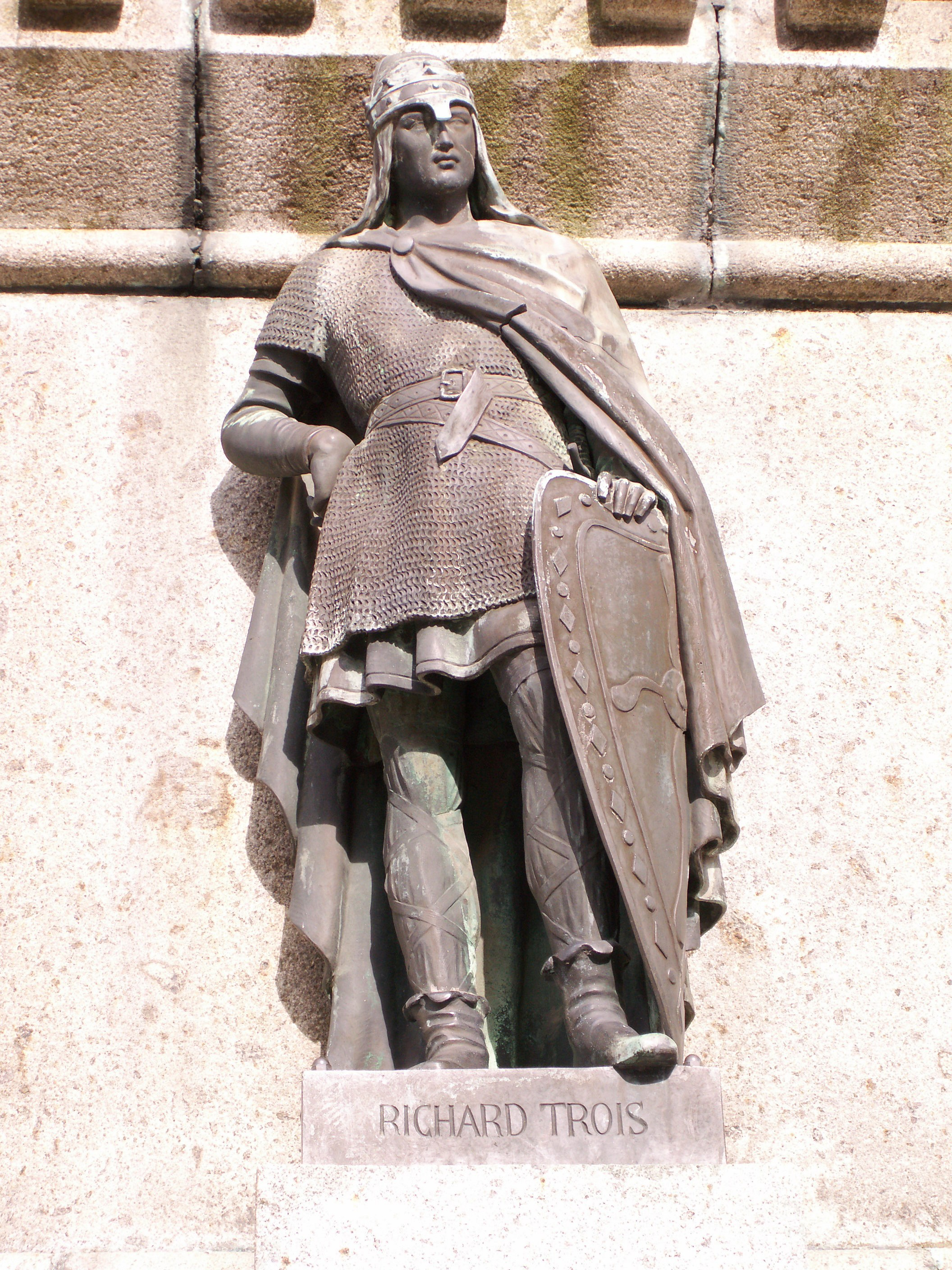
Richard III

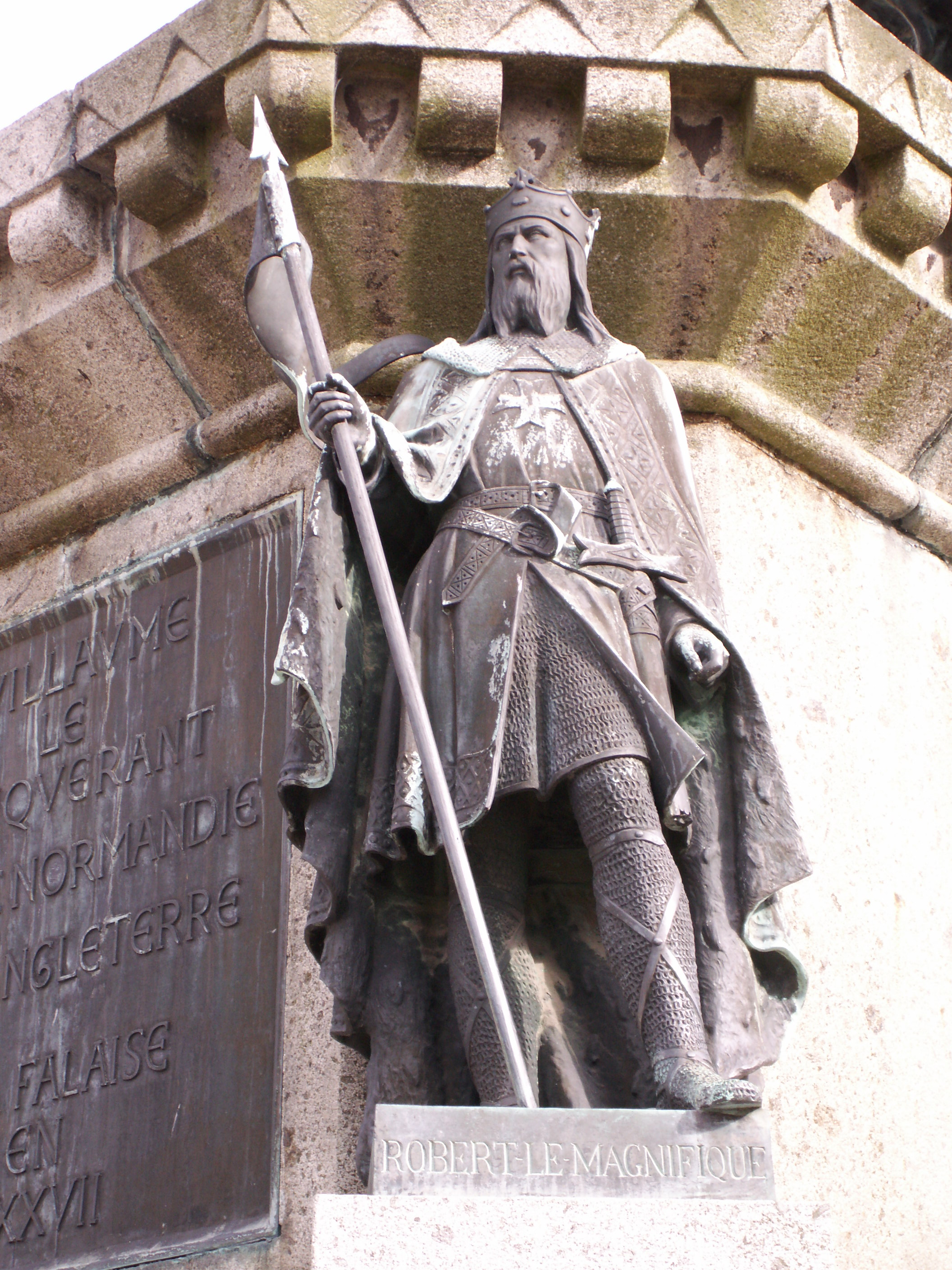
Robert I

=== Plaque ===
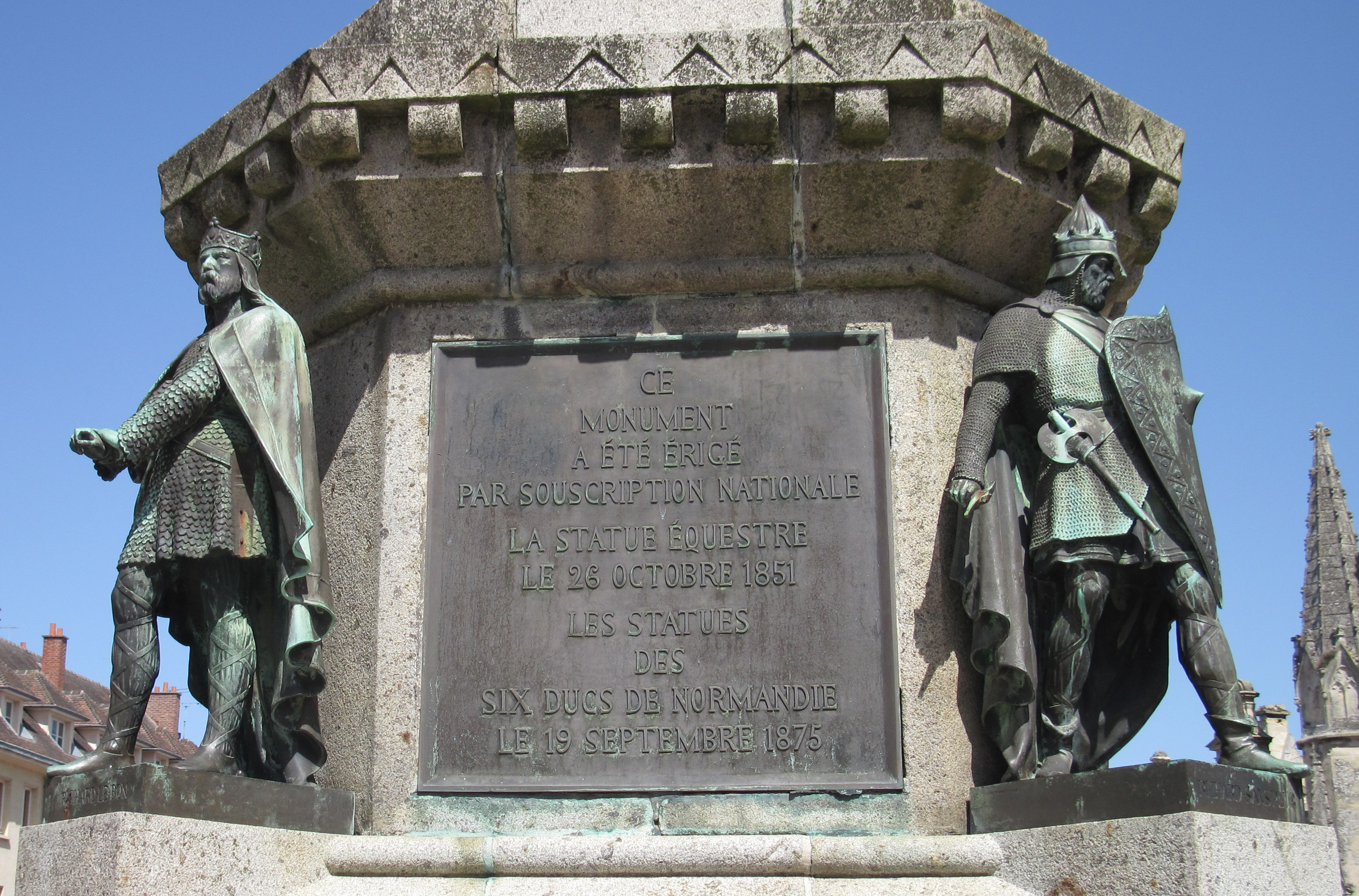
The plaque

The French inscription on the plaque translates into English as follows:

This monument was erected by national subscription
The equestrian statue on October 26, 1851
The statues of six dukes of Normandy on September 19, 1875

== Location ==
The statue is located on Place Guillaume-le-Conquérant in Falaise, near the town hall, the Trinity Church, and Château de Falaise.

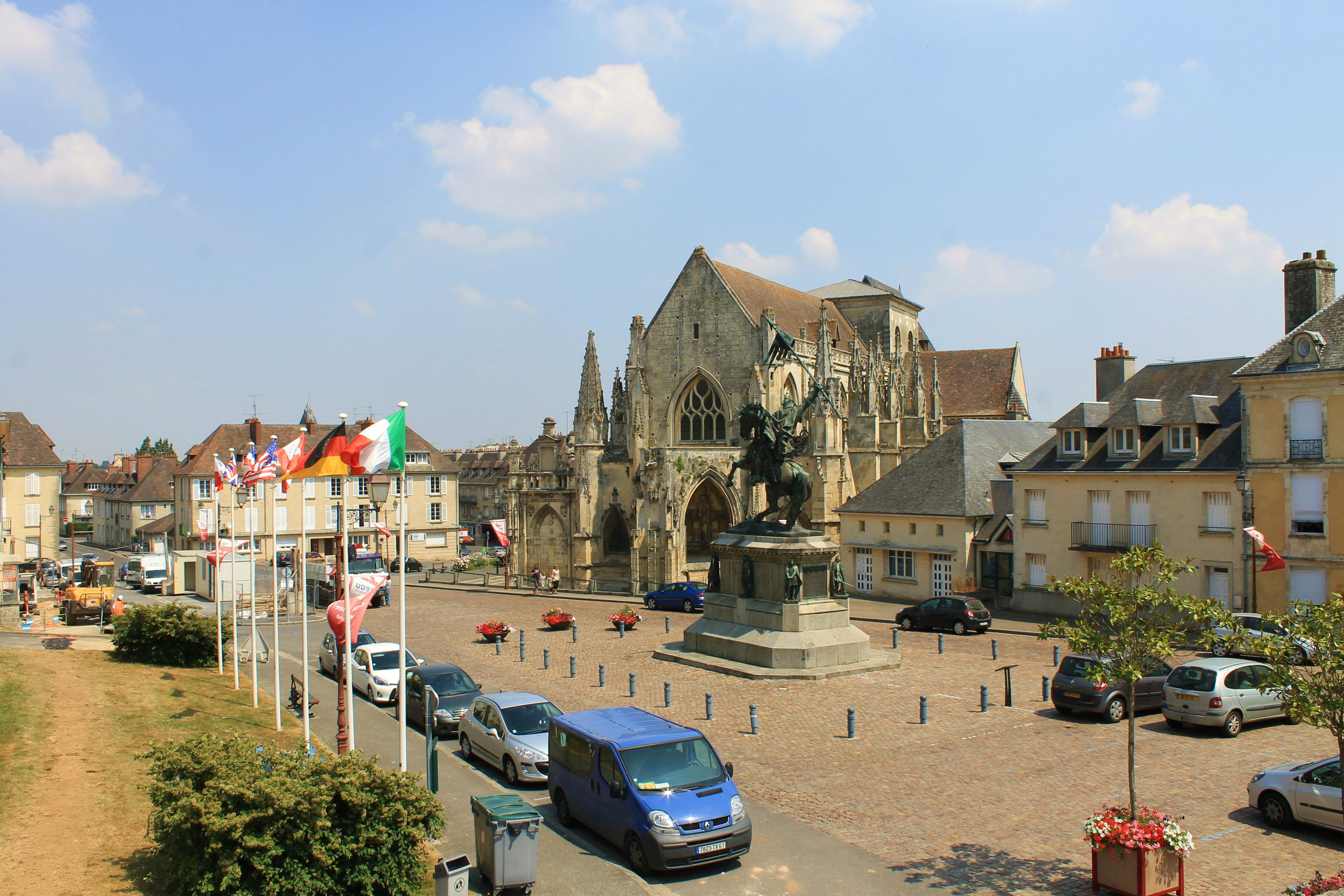
The Place Guillaume-le-Conquérant in Falaise.

== Protection ==
The monument has been registered as a historic monument since 18 July 2006. The statue is owned by the municipality of Falaise.
