= Falaise, Calvados =

Falaise
- Commune
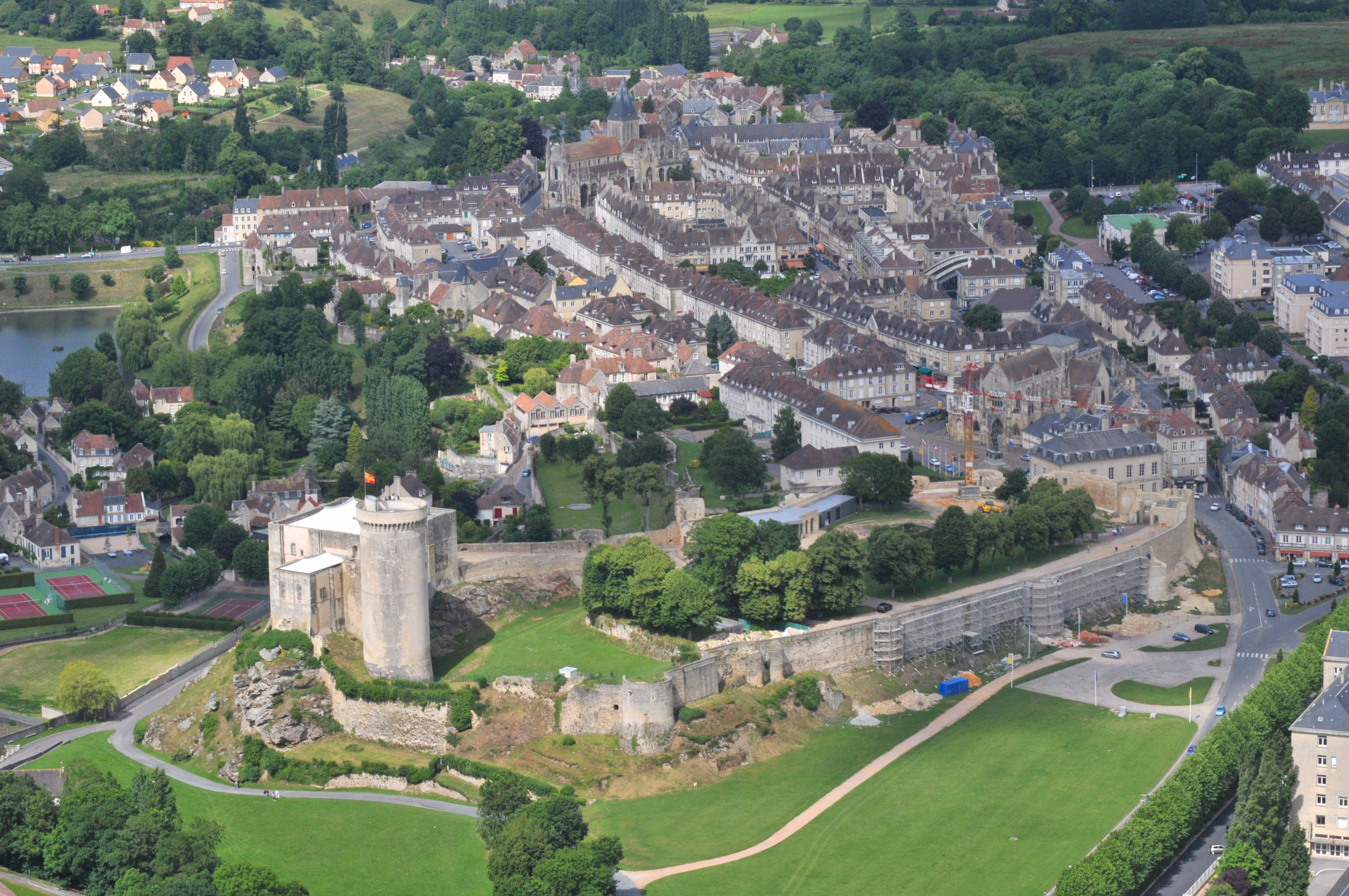
- The chateau and town centre of Falaise

- Coat of arms
- Location of Falaise
- Location within France Location within Normandy
- Coordinates: 48°53′50″N 00°11′51″W
- Country: France
- Region: Normandy
- Department: Calvados
- Arrondissement: Caen
- Canton: Falaise
- Intercommunality: Pays de Falaise

Government
  - Mayor (2020–2026): Hervé Maunoury
- Area^{1}: 11.84 km^{2} (4.57 sq mi)
- Elevation: 132 m (433 ft)
- Highest elevation: 188 m (617 ft)
- Lowest elevation: 89 m (292 ft)
- Population (2023): 7,680
  - Density: 649/km^{2} (1,680/sq mi)
- Time zone: UTC+01:00 (CET)
  - Summer (DST): UTC+02:00 (CEST)
- INSEE/Postal code: 14258 /14700
- ^{1} French Land Register data, which excludes lakes, ponds, glaciers > 1 km^{2} (0.386 sq mi or 247 acres) and river estuaries.

Falaise (French pronunciation: [falɛz]) is a commune in the Calvados department, in the Normandy region of northwestern France. The town is famous for being the birthplace of William the Conqueror. It was also the centre of the area known as the Falaise pocket, the decisive engagement of the Battle of Normandy in the Second World War.

== Geography ==
Falaise lies at the eastern edge of the Armorican Massif, and the town has rocky outcrops on its edges such as the 173-metre-high (568 ft) Mount Myrrha.

The commune is spread over an area of 11.84 square kilometres (2,930 acres) with a maximum altitude of 188 metres (616 ft 10 in) and minimum of 89 metres (292 ft 0 in).

Flowing through Falaise are the river Ante and the river Trainefeuille, both tributaries of the river Dives.

Falaise borders the area known as Suisse Normande, on its eastern side.

=== Land distribution ===
According to the 2018 CORINE Land Cover assessment, 35% (416 hectares (1,030 acres)) is Meadows, closely followed at 29% by Urbanised. The rest is Arable land at 24%, Industrial and commercial spaces at 9% and the remaining 2% (24 hectares (59 acres)) is Forest.

=== Climate ===
Climate data for Falaise (Damblainville) (1991–2020 normals, extremes 1974–present)
Month	Jan	Feb	Mar	Apr	May	Jun	Jul	Aug	Sep	Oct	Nov	Dec	Year
Record high °C (°F)	16.3 (61.3)	20.6 (69.1)	24.6 (76.3)	27.1 (80.8)	29.9 (85.8)	37.1 (98.8)	40.5 (104.9)	38.6 (101.5)	33.7 (92.7)	29.3 (84.7)	21.9 (71.4)	16.3 (61.3)	40.5 (104.9)
Mean daily maximum °C (°F)	7.5 (45.5)	8.7 (47.7)	11.6 (52.9)	15.0 (59.0)	18.1 (64.6)	21.4 (70.5)	23.6 (74.5)	23.6 (74.5)	20.9 (69.6)	16.1 (61.0)	11.3 (52.3)	8.3 (46.9)	15.5 (59.9)
Daily mean °C (°F)	5.0 (41.0)	5.7 (42.3)	7.9 (46.2)	10.4 (50.7)	13.4 (56.1)	16.5 (61.7)	18.5 (65.3)	18.6 (65.5)	16.2 (61.2)	12.6 (54.7)	8.5 (47.3)	5.8 (42.4)	11.6 (52.9)
Mean daily minimum °C (°F)	2.5 (36.5)	2.7 (36.9)	4.2 (39.6)	5.9 (42.6)	8.8 (47.8)	11.6 (52.9)	13.3 (55.9)	13.6 (56.5)	11.5 (52.7)	9.1 (48.4)	5.7 (42.3)	3.2 (37.8)	7.7 (45.9)
Record low °C (°F)	−12.5 (9.5)	−9.9 (14.2)	−6.5 (20.3)	−2.5 (27.5)	0.6 (33.1)	4.7 (40.5)	7.4 (45.3)	7.5 (45.5)	3.2 (37.8)	−2.4 (27.7)	−5.5 (22.1)	−8.0 (17.6)	−12.5 (9.5)
Average precipitation mm (inches)	63.0 (2.48)	53.2 (2.09)	53.5 (2.11)	52.7 (2.07)	61.9 (2.44)	52.9 (2.08)	48.3 (1.90)	57.0 (2.24)	49.8 (1.96)	72.8 (2.87)	70.7 (2.78)	81.0 (3.19)	716.8 (28.22)
Average precipitation days (≥ 1.0 mm)	12.3	11.4	10.4	9.9	9.7	8.5	8.2	9.0	8.2	11.9	13.3	14.0	126.7
Source: Meteociel

== History ==
The area around Falaise has been inhabited from Mesolithic times (approximately 7000BC) , but it was only at the end of the prehistoric period and the beginning of the Gallo-Roman era that the area, Falaise in particular, was regularly inhabited. Evidence of settlement from the time has been found at Vaston, an agricultural area just north-east of the modern town.

=== Middle Ages ===
In 911 AD the town became part of the Duchy of Normandy when Duke Rollo was granted lands, including Falaise, by Charles the Simple in exchange for Rollo agreeing to end his brigandage, swear allegiance to Charles, convert to Christianity, and pledge to defend the Seine estuary from other Viking raiders.

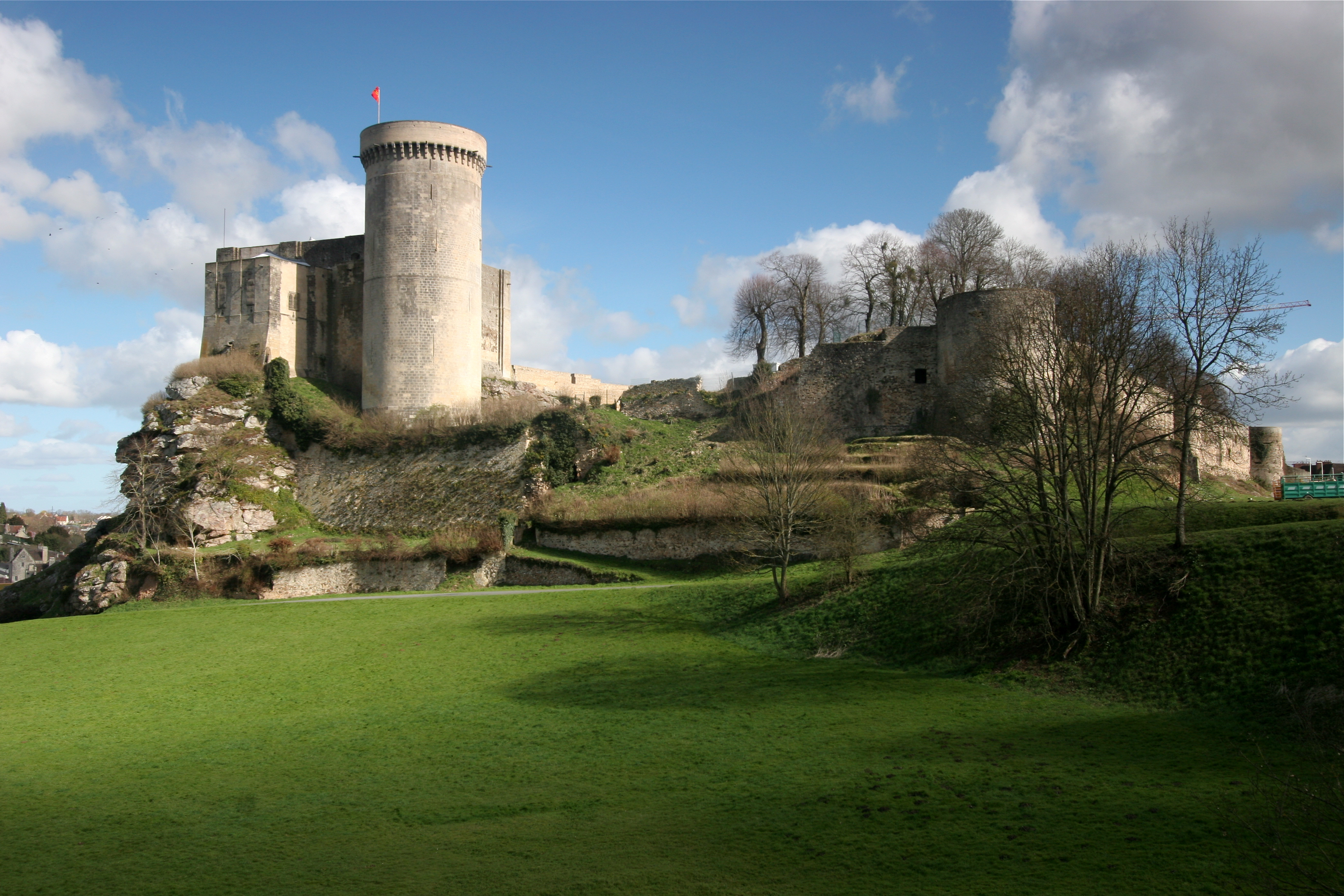
The Château de Falaise on its rocky crag

Falaise, as it is sited today, probably came into being around the castle.

The town was the birthplace of William the Conqueror, first of the Norman kings of England. He was frequently referred to as William the Bastard, on account of his being born out of wedlock to Herleva from Falaise, reputedly a tanner's daughter.

The Château de Falaise (12th–13th century), which overlooks the town from a high crag (French: falaise), was formerly the seat of the Dukes of Normandy. Also, the Treaty of Falaise was signed at the castle in December 1174 between the captive William I, King of Scots, and the Plantagenet king of England, Henry II.

At the end of the 12th century Philip II of France took control of Normandy and Falaise from the Normans, and building a new Tower for the towns castle, as well as restoring the Holy Trinity Church in the town.

The town was also the place that Rabbi Yom Tov of Falaise, grandchild of Rashi, held his rabbinical court, during the 13th century.

During the Hundred Years' War the town remained under control of the English until 1450 when the French won the Siege of Falaise.

=== Modern era ===
In January 1590 the castle was besieged by the troops of Henry IV of France as part of the French Wars of Religion. The damaged caused to the castle from the cannons during this last siege marked the end of Falaise being a significant military strategic point.

On 26 October 1851, a statue of William the Conqueror was inaugurated here (at his place of birth).

=== World War II ===
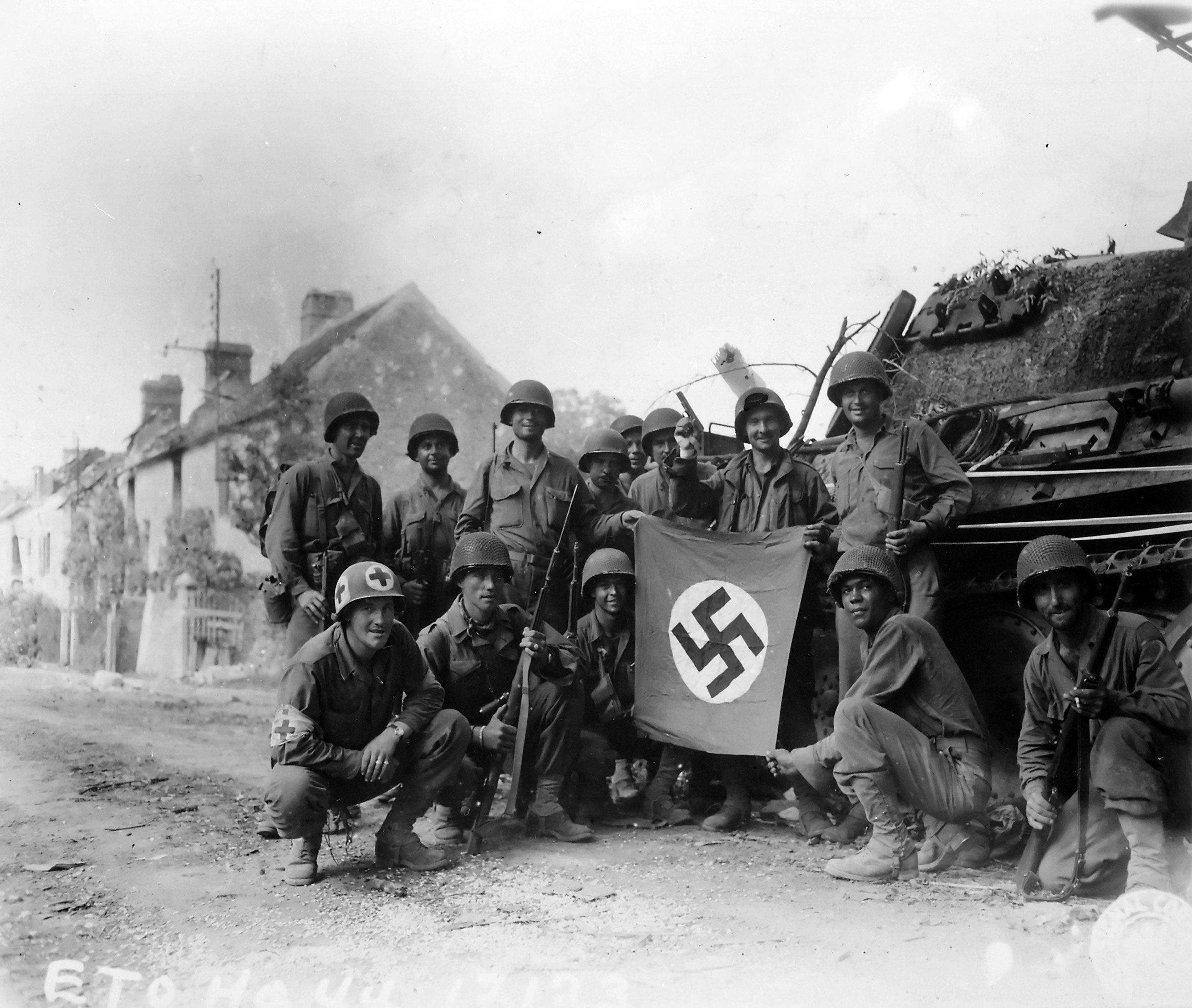
After the Liberation of Falaise by the 2nd Canadian Infantry Division on 17 August 1944, U.S. troops pose with a captured German flag by a knocked-out tank.

In modern times, it is known for the battle of the Falaise pocket during the Allied reconquest of France (called Operation Overlord) in August 1944 in which two German armies were encircled and destroyed by the allied armies. Some 10,000 German troops were killed and 50,000 taken prisoner.

Two-thirds of Falaise was destroyed by allied bombing before the town was taken by a combined force of Canadian and Polish troops. Falaise was largely restored after the war.

=== Post War to today ===
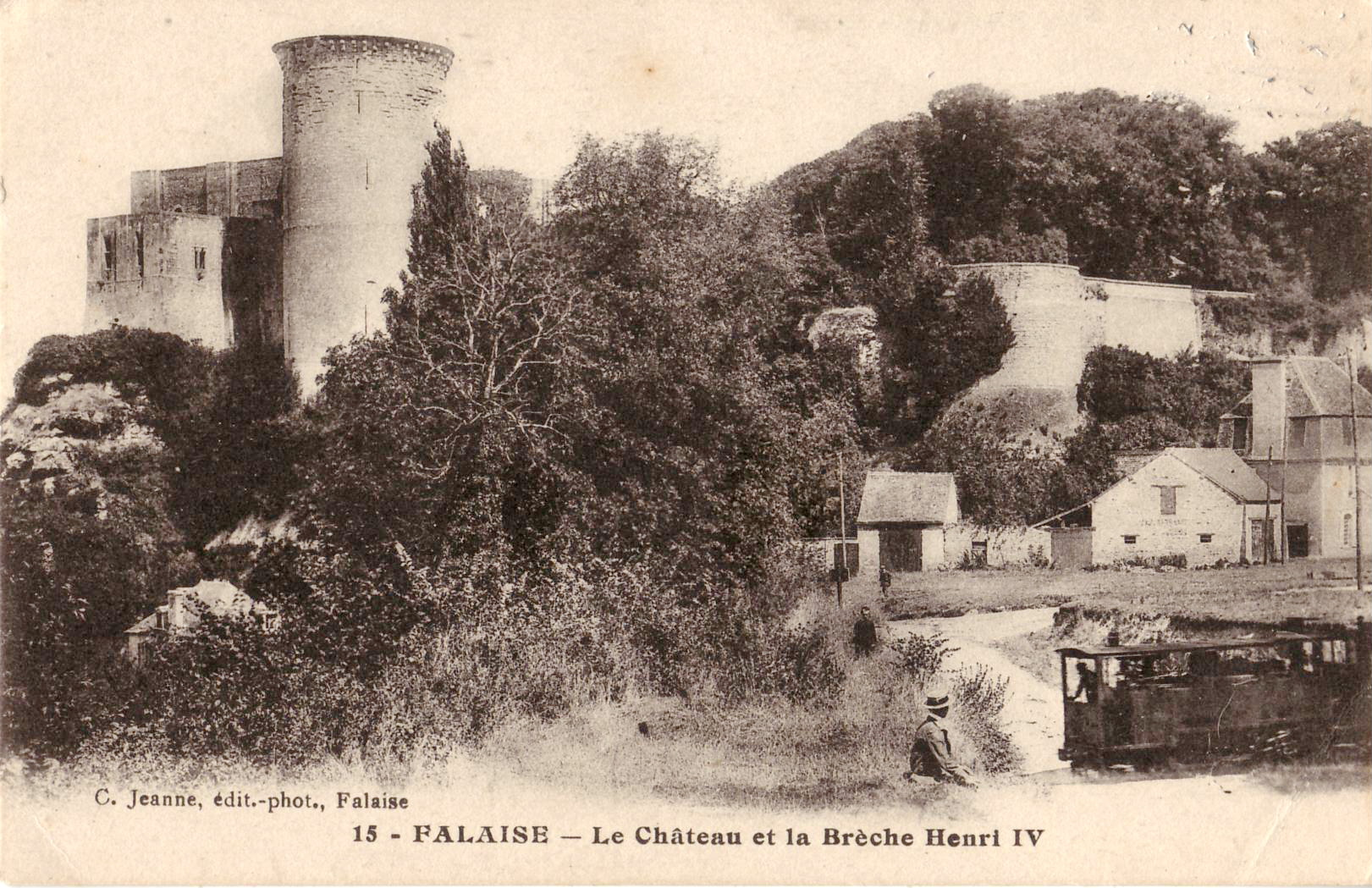
Postcard showing the old railway line at foot of the castle

In 1953 Falaise station stopped its public rail services, having served the town for 94 years. The station continued serving freight only before finally closing in 1990, when it was demolished and replaced with a supermarket.

== Population ==
Historical population
Year	Pop.	±% p.a.
1968	7,180	—
1975	8,368	+2.21%
1982	8,597	+0.39%
1990	8,119	−0.71%
1999	8,434	+0.42%
2007	8,456	+0.03%
2012	8,413	−0.10%
2017	8,186	−0.55%
2023	7,680	−1.06%
Source: INSEE

== Points of Interest ==
=== Château de Falaise ===
The main attraction for the town is the Château de Falaise, which was used by Norman royalty as the seat of the Dukes of Normandy, until the 13th century, when it was captured by King Philip II of France. It is commonly known as Château Guillaume le Conquérant or William the Conqueror's Castle as he was born here. In 1840 it was declared a monument historique in 1840, and today is open to the public.

=== National heritage sites ===
In addition to the castle Falaise has another 23 buildings and areas listed as a monument historique. Three of these listed buildings, the old courthouse and two houses, are no longer remaining as were destroyed during World War II. Another three listed buildings are town houses from the sixteenth, seventeenth and eighteenth centuries. The remaining 17 listed sites are below:

- Château de la Fresnaye – a seventeenth-century chateau, home of Nicolas Vauquelin, which was listed as a monument in 1945. Since 1986 it has been owned by the city and is now used for hosting exhibitions.
- Statue of William the Conqueror – a nineteenth-century statue, showing William the Conqueror, mounted on a horse, and carrying the Gonfalon which had been handed over to him by Pope Alexander II. The statue was created by Louis Rochet, and was listed as a monument in 2024.
- Place Guillaume-le-Conquérant – The cobblestone floor surrounding the statue and leading to the castle was listed as a monument in 1935.
- Old City walls – Remains of the 13th century and 17th century city walls, which were first listed as a monument in 1927.
- Covered market – Built in 1953 to replace the old grain hall which was destroyed during the war, the building was listed as a monument in 2010.
- Mesnil-Besnard Manor – a 16th-century manor house listed as a monument in 1987.
- Hôtel-Dieu – a thirteenth century place for the sick and elderly to receive care. In 1764 it was converted to a chapel; it remained as such until World War 2, when it was almost completely destroyed. During the 1960s and 1970s it was completely restored and is now the Cities Library. It was registered as a monument in 1927.
- La Romaine Inn – Former seventeenth century hostel, which was listed as a monument in 1946.
- Inn sign – a 17th-century carved stone sign for an Inn, listed as a monument in 1946.
- Guibray fair lodges – Former 18th century lodge house, registered as a monument in 1975.
- Hotel Saint-Léonard – an 18th-century hotel that was listed as a monument in 1968.
- Les Rives Hotel – a former hotel built in the 18th century, that was recently discovered to be on top of medieval remains. The building was listed as a monument in 1967.
- Louis Liard Lycée – This secondary school for boys was built in the third quarter of the 20th century after the original school was destroyed in World War 2. The building was listed in 2010.
- Church of Our Lady of Guibray – a 12th-century Romanesque church listed as a monument in 1961.
- Church of Saint-Gervais-Saint-Protais – a twelfth-century church whose construction probably began shortly after the conquest of England in 1066, at the instigation of William the Conqueror. It was listed as a monument in 1862.
- Church of St. Lawrence – a 12th-century church, built with donations from Matilda of Flanders. It was listed as a monument in 1927.
- Holy Trinity Church – First built in 840 but it was destroyed during the siege of Philippe Auguste then rebuilt in 1204. It was listed in 1889.

=== Museums ===
- Musée des Automates – Established in 1994, the museum is dedicated to Automatons, mainly ones between 1920 and 1960, with over 300 on display.
- André Lemaître Museum – established in 2000 and dedicated to the work of artist André Lemaître. in December 2022 the museum added Micro-Folie de Falaise – Espace André Lemaitre, which allows visitors to access digitally on giant screens 2,500 art works from 12 major French museums.
- Memorial des Civils dans La Guerre histoire – inaugurated in 2016, the museum is dedicated to the daily life of the people at the heart of the Second World War and pays tribute to the 20,000 civilians killed during the Battle of Normandy.
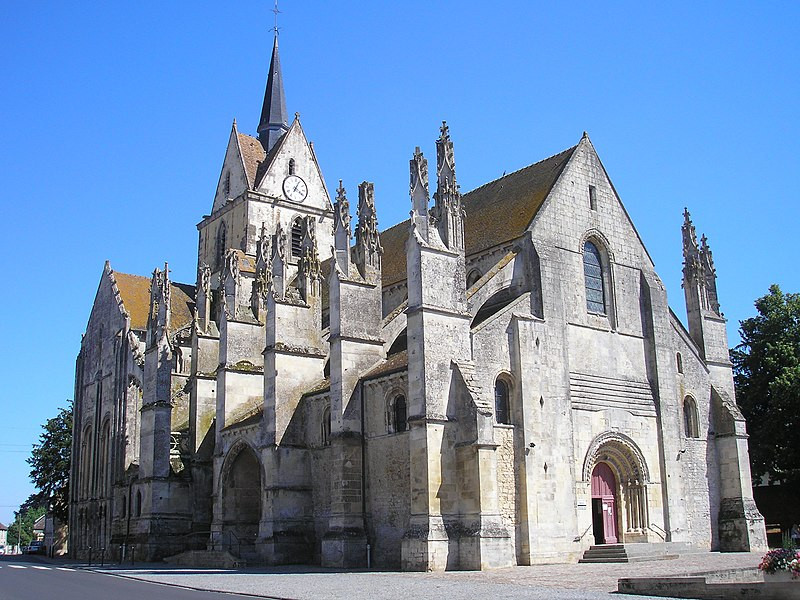
Church of Our Lady of Guibray

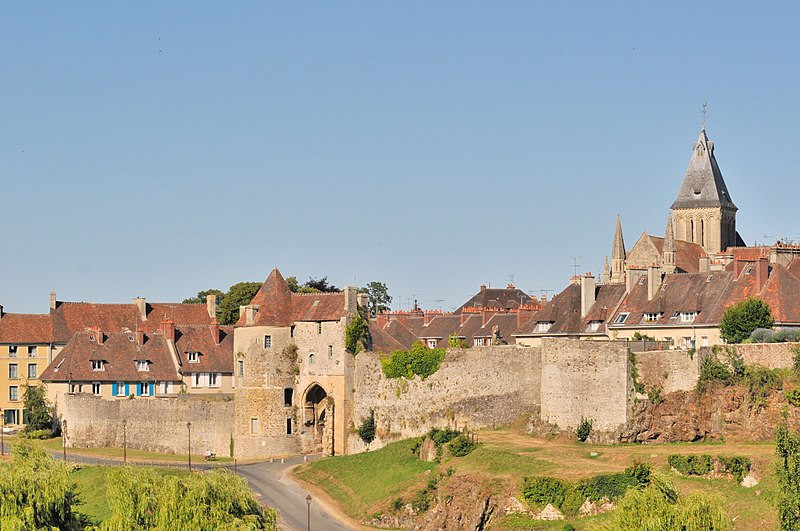
Old City walls of Falaise

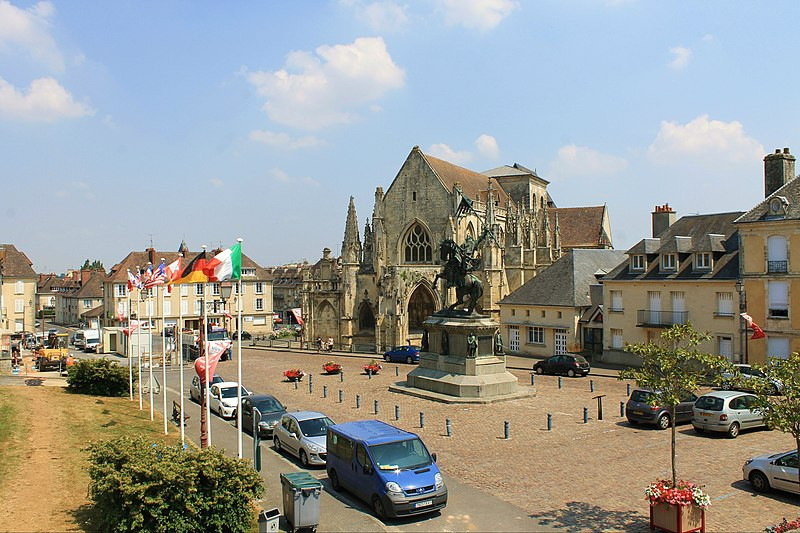
Place Guillaume-le-Conquérant

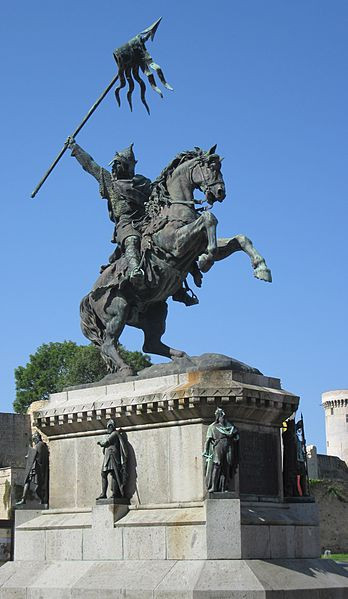
Statue of William the Conqueror

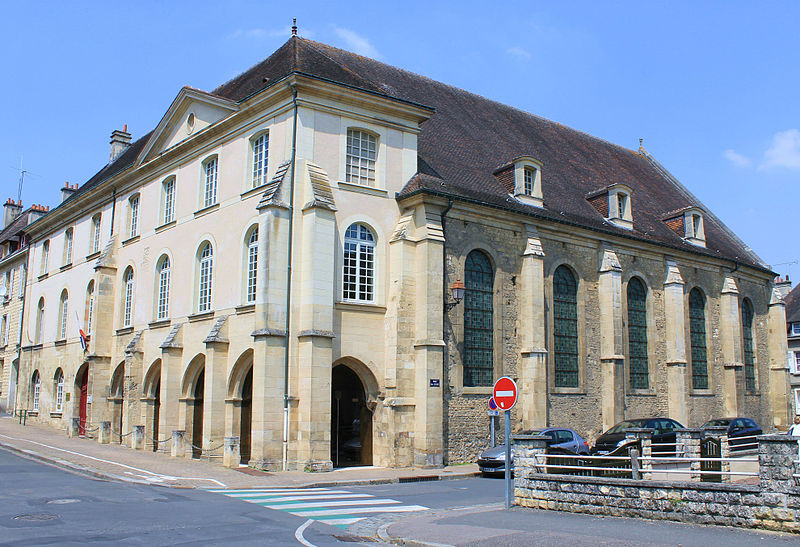
The old hotel dieu in Falaise - now the city library

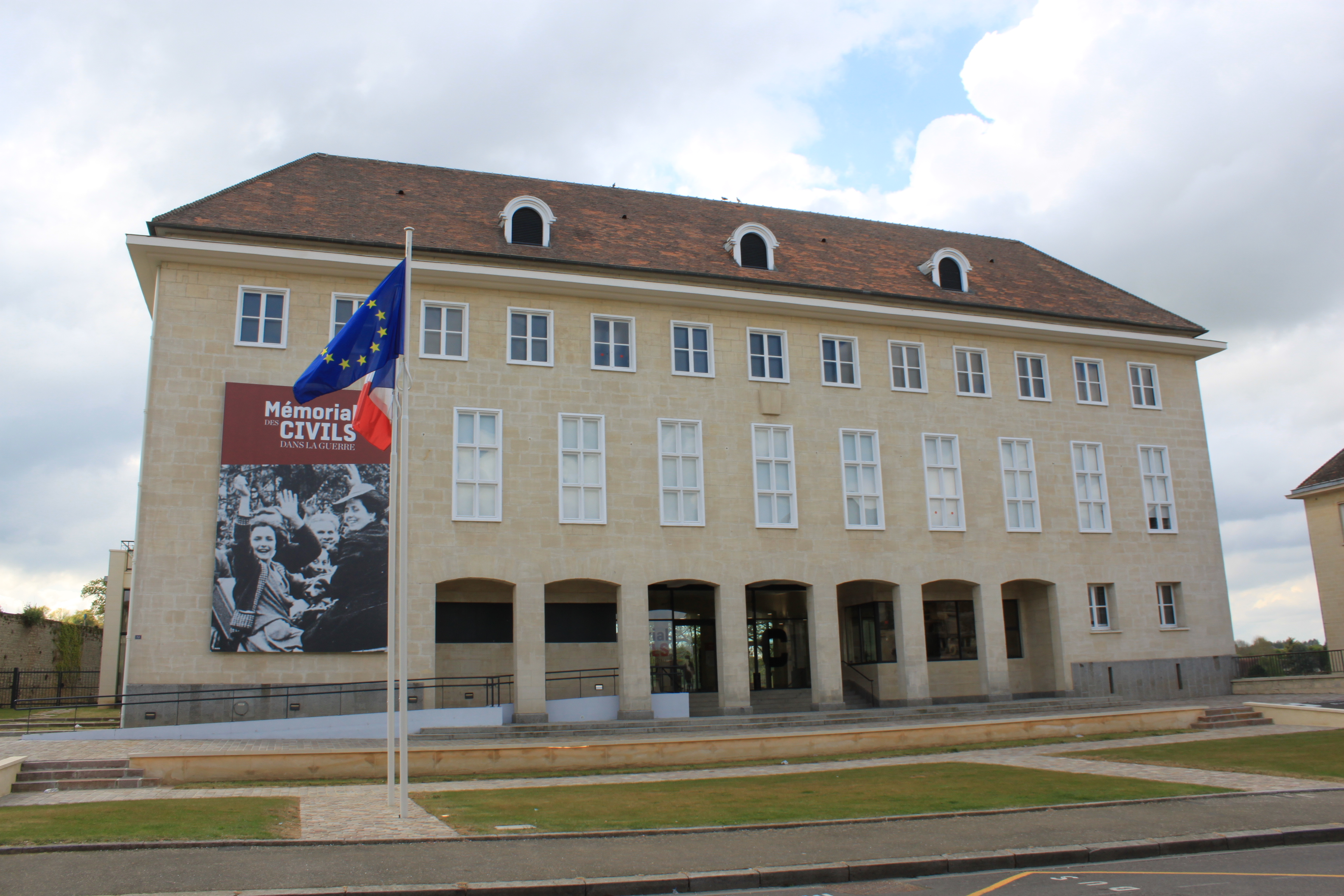
Memorial des Civils dans La Guerre histoire

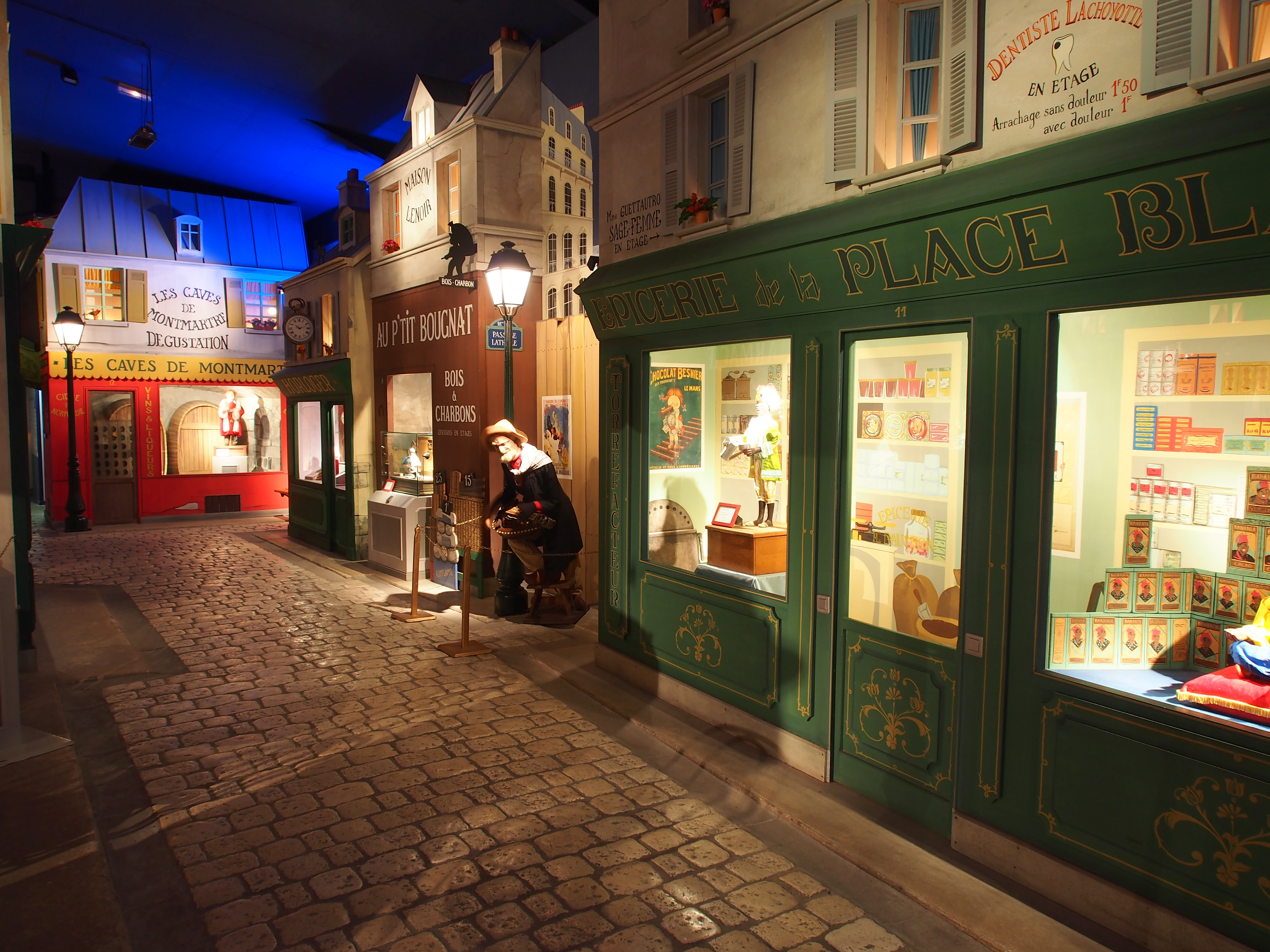
Musée des Automates

== Notable people and animals ==
- Herleva – (died c. 1050) a Norman woman known for having been the mother of William the Conqueror, and also of William's prominent half-brothers Odo of Bayeux and Robert, Count of Mortain was born here.
- William the Conqueror (c. 1028 – 1087), future king of England, was born in Falaise.
- Yom Tov of Falaise, an 11th-century French rabbi, grandson of Rashi was born here.
- Samuel ben Solomon of Falaise, 12th- and 13th-century French rabbi also known by his name, Sir Morel was born here.
- Nicolas Vauquelin des Yveteaux – (1567–1649) a French libertine poet, the son of Jean Vauquelin de la Fresnaye was born here at the château de La Fresnaye.
- Antoine de Montchrestien – (c. 1575 – 1621) a French soldier, dramatist, adventurer and economist was born here.
- François Bonnemer (1638–1689) – a French painter and engraver, was born here.
- Jacques de Falaise (1754–1825) – a quarryman who became famous for his ingestion skills was born here.
- Pierre Henry-Larivière (1761–1838) a French politician and député for Calvados to the Convention was born here.
- Frédéric de Lafresnaye (1783–1861), ornithologist, was born and died here.
- Louis Alphonse de Brébisson – (1798–1888) a French botanist and photographer was born and died here.
- Moustache – (1799–1812) a barbet who is reputed to have played a part in the French Revolutionary and Napoleonic Wars, was born here.
- Pauline Roland – (1805–1852) a French feminist and socialist was born here.
- Charles-Philippe de Chennevières-Pointel – (1820–1899) a French writer and art historian was born here.
- Louis Alphonse Gassion – (1881–1944) was the father of Édith Piaf also an entertainer, circus performer and theatre actor, who was born here.
- Lucien Plantefol – (1891–1983) a botanist and member of the French Academy of Sciences who developed a theory of leaf helices to explain phyllotaxis was born here.
- Jacques Hébert – (1920–2018) a French politician was born and later died here.
- Alain Ferté (b.1955) is a French professional racing driver, who was born here.
- Michel Ferté (1958–2023) was a French professional racing driver who was born here.
- Rodolphe Thomas (b. 1962) is a French politician and member of the MoDem who was born here.
- Stéphane Le Bouyonnec (b. 1962) is a Canadian politician who was born here.
- Cédric Hengbart (b.1980) is a French professional football manager and former player who was born here.

== Sport ==
Falaise has a swimming pool the Centre Aquatique FORMÉO, which has been open since 2004. The pool, features both indoor and outdoor pools as well as sauna, steam room areas.

== Twin towns – sister cities ==
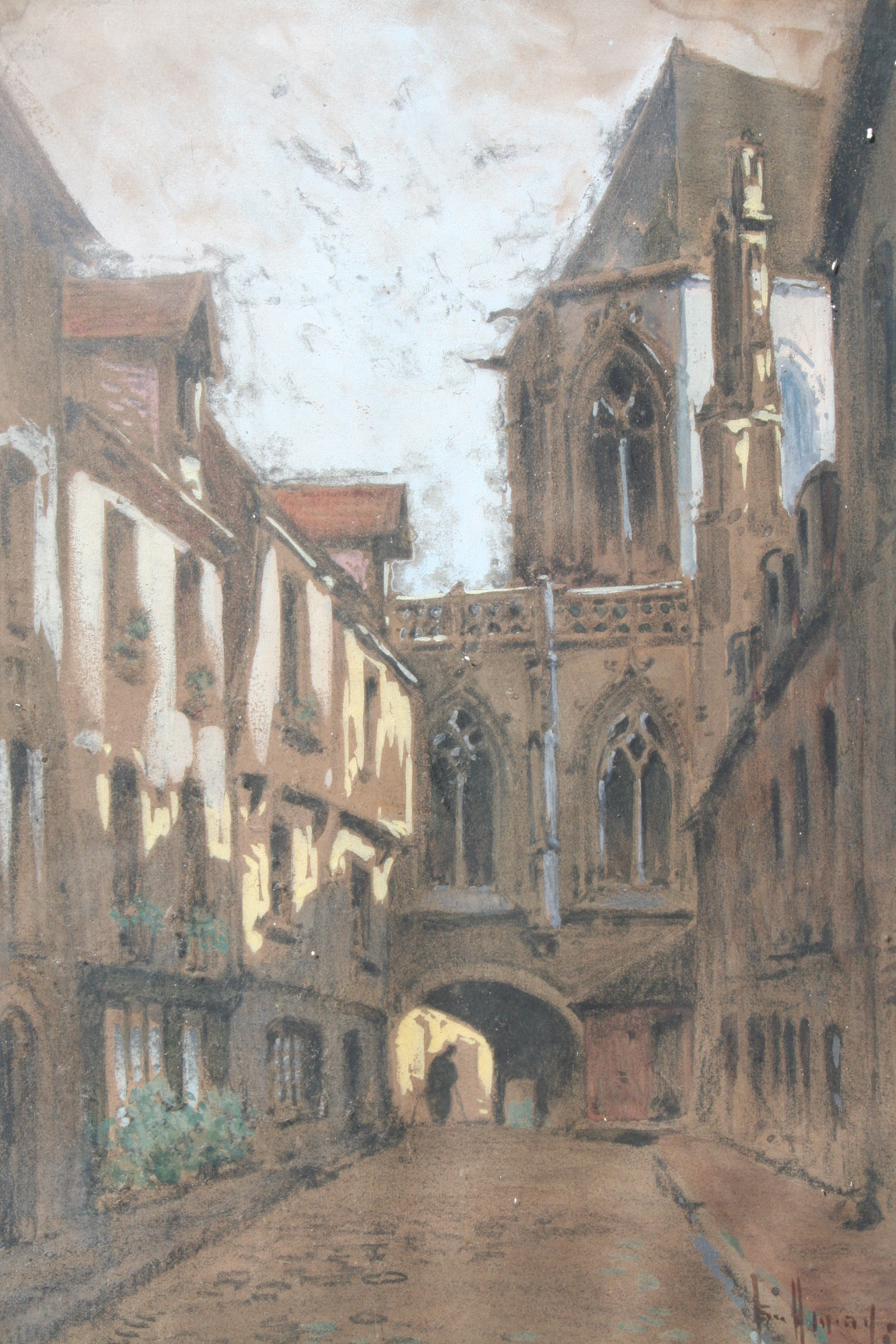
Falaise Watercolour by Émile Appay (1876–1935)

Falaise is twinned with:

- Henley-on-Thames, United Kingdom since 1974
- Bad Neustadt an der Saale, Germany since 1969
- Cassino, Italy since 1975
- Alma, Quebec, Canada since 1969

== See also ==
- Communes of the Calvados department
