= François Bonnemer =

French painter and engraver

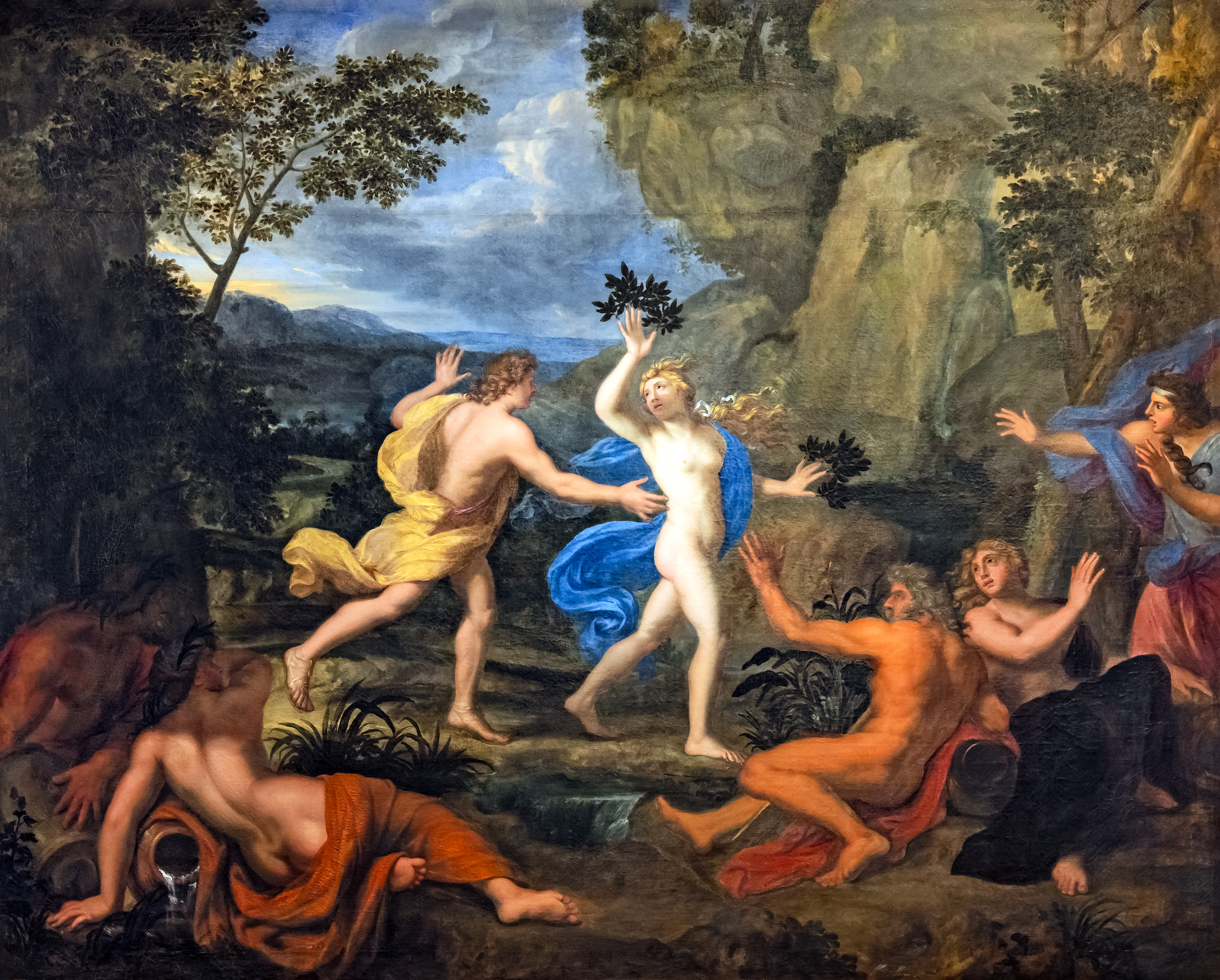
- Apollo chasing Daphne Musée Ingres
- Born: Michèle Gabrielle Alice Gérard; October 1638; Falaise, Calvados, France
- Died: 9 June 1689 (aged 50); Paris, France
- Known for: painter and engraver

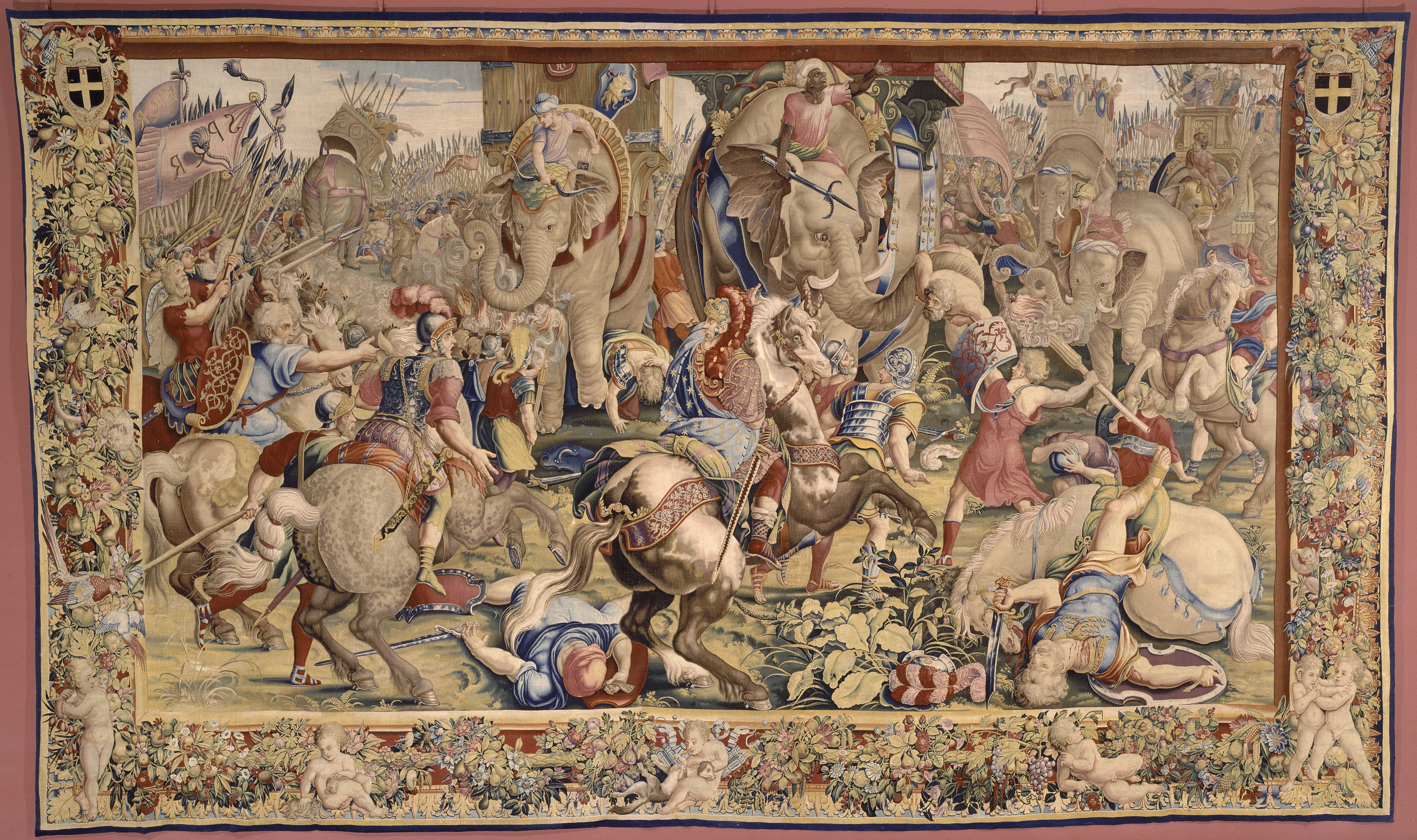
Tapestry, cartoon by Bonnemer after Jules Roman (model) and Francesco Penni: Tenture de Scipion: La Bataille de Zama (1688-1690). Now at the Louvre.

François Bonnemer was a French painter and engraver who was born at Falaise in 1637. He worked with Monier, the younger Corneille, and the younger Vouet on the ceiling of the gallery of the King's Audience Chamber at the Tuileries, and was commissioned by the king to copy some works of Carracci in the Farnese Gallery at Rome. He engraved several plates after Le Brun, and was the master of Ménageot. He died in Paris in 1689.
