= Lucien Plantefol =

French botanist (1891–1983)

- Born: 21 April 1891; Falaise
- Died: 9 September 1983 (aged 92); Paris
- Known for: Theory of foliar helices
- Scientific career
- Fields: Botany
- Institutions: Académie des sciences

Lucien Plantefol (1891–1983) was a French botanist and member of the French Academy of Sciences who developed a theory of leaf helices to explain phyllotaxis.

== Life and work ==
Plantefol was born in Falaise on 24 April 1891 and spent his youth in Montbéliard. He was called up in 1914 as a second lieutenant in the 82nd Infantry Regiment, but was quickly wounded in the Battle of the Meuse and returned from the front to work in the physiology and chemistry laboratories of the National Defense. There he helped to develop the gas mask.

He became an associate professor at the Ecole Normale Supérieure and then assistant director at the Collège de France, where he devoted himself to the study of plant physiology. After becoming professor of botany at the Sorbonne, he carried out the work for which he is best remembered. This work on phyllotaxis—observing the arrangement of the leaves on the stem of a plant—led to his theory of foliar helices ("helices foliaires"). He carried on other studies on the origin of the petals of certain flowers, and in the history of science. He was particularly interested in the eighteenth century and the botanical knowledge of that period.

Plantefol wrote a text, Cours de botanique et de biologie végétale (Course in Botany and Plant Biology), which came to be considered a basic work in the teaching of this discipline.

He was elected a member of the French Academy of Sciences on 13 May 1957.

Plantefol died in Paris on 9 September 1983.

== Works ==
- Cours de botanique et de biologie végétale, E. Belin, Paris, 1939
- La Théorie des hélices foliaires multiples, Masson, Paris, 1948
- Fondements d'une théorie florale nouvelle - l'ontogénie de la fleur, Masson, Paris, 1949
- Cours de biologie cellulaire et végétale, à l'usage des candidats au P.C.B., E. Belin, Paris, 1959
- Trois siècles d'académie des sciences (1666-1966), Gauthiers-Villars, Paris, 1967

== Biography ==
Plantefol has been the subject of a biographical article.
