= Château de Falaise =

Castle in Normandy, France

Château de Falaise Falaise Castle
- Falaise, Normandy, France
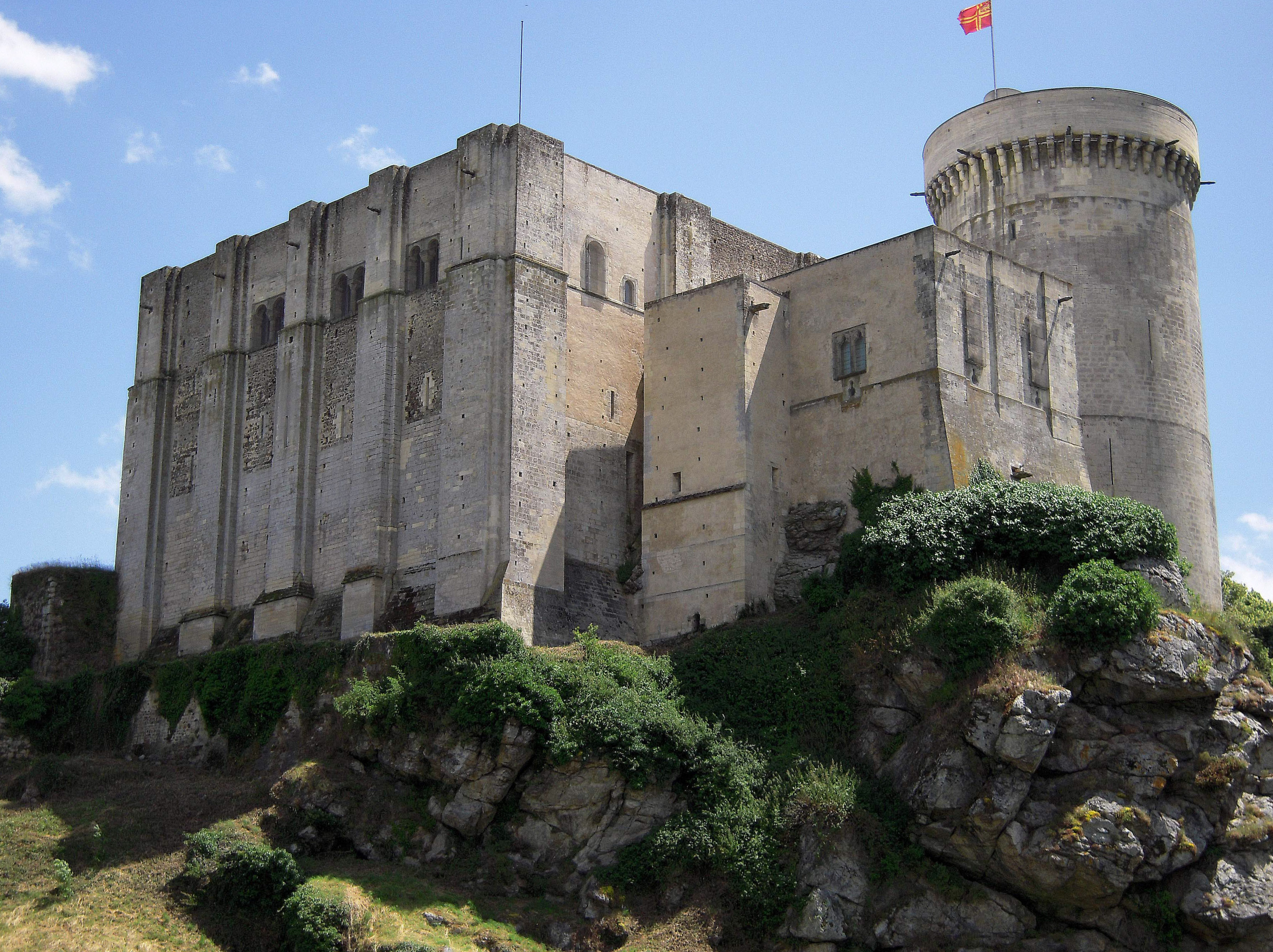
- The keeps

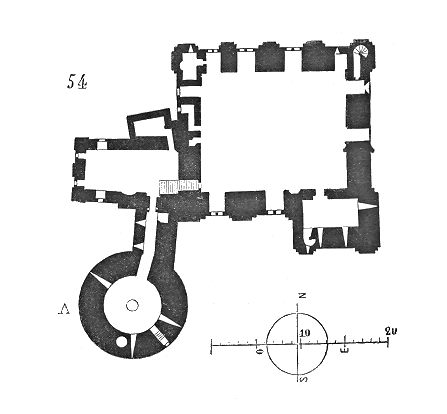

Site information
- Owner: City of Falaise
- Controlled by: Dukes of Normandy
- Condition: Renovated

Location
- Location within France
- Coordinates: 48.8932°N 0.2039°W

Site history
- Materials: Limestone

The Château de Falaise is a 12th-13th century castle, located in the south of the commune of Falaise ("cliff" in French) in the département of Calvados, in the region of Normandy, France. William the Conqueror, the son of Duke Robert of Normandy, was born at an earlier castle on the same site in about 1028. William went on to conquer England and become king, and possession of the castle descended through his heirs until the 13th century, when it was captured by King Philip II of France. Because of his association to the location (though not the existing physical structure) it is also known as Château Guillaume le Conquérant or William the Conqueror's Castle.

Possession of the castle changed hands several times during the Hundred Years' War. The castle was abandoned during the 17th century. Since 1840 it has been protected as a monument historique.

== History ==
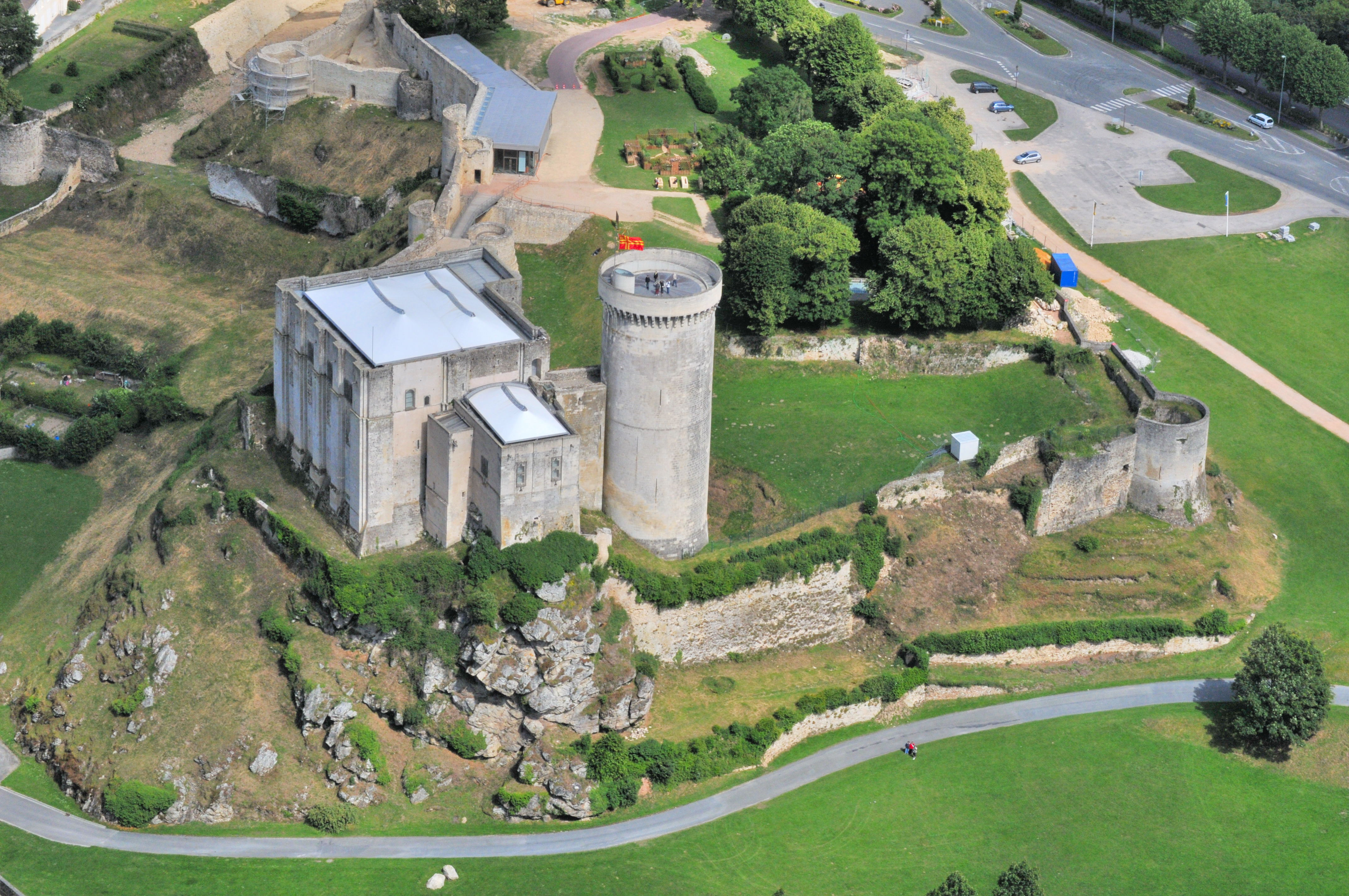
The Château de Falaise from the air

On the death of Richard II, Duke of Normandy, in August 1026 his son (also called Richard) succeeded to the duchy. The inheritance however was disputed by Richard III's younger brother, Robert. Not content with his inheritance of the town of Exmes and its surrounding area, Robert rebelled and took up arms against his brother, and he captured the castle of Falaise. Richard then besieged the castle and forced Robert to submit to him. However, when Richard died from unknown causes in 1027, Robert became Duke of Normandy. Robert fathered an illegitimate son by a woman named Herleva, who was from the town of Falaise and the daughter of a chamberlain. The child, William, was born in about 1028.

The castle (12th–13th century), which overlooks the town from a high crag, was formerly the seat of the Dukes of Normandy. The construction was started on the site of an earlier castle in 1123 by Henry I of England, with the "large keep" (grand donjon). Later was added the "small keep" (petit donjon).

The tower built in the first quarter of the 12th century contained a hall, chapel, and a room for the lord, but no small rooms for a complicated household arrangement; in this way, it was similar to towers at Corfe, Norwich, and Portchester, all in England.

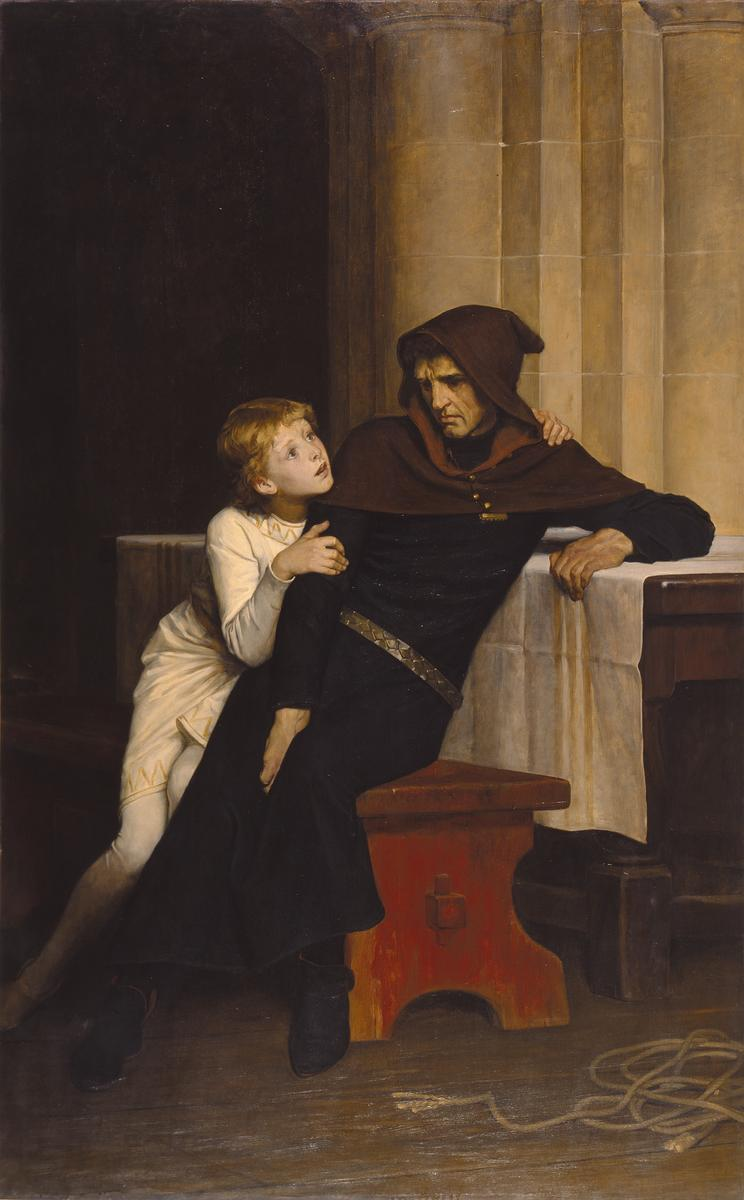
Prince Arthur as a prisoner of Hubert de Burgh in Falaise Castle, by William Frederick Yeames.

Arthur I, Duke of Brittany, was King John of England's teenage nephew, and a rival claimant to the throne of England. With the support of King Philip II of France, Arthur embarked on a campaign in Normandy against John in 1202, and Poitou revolted in support of Arthur. The Duke of Brittany besieged his grandmother, Eleanor of Aquitaine, in the Château de Mirebeau. John marched on Mirebeau, taking Arthur by surprise and capturing him on 1 August. From there Arthur was conveyed to Falaise where he was imprisoned in the castle's keep. According to contemporaneous chronicler Ralph of Coggeshall, John ordered two of his servants to mutilate the duke. Hugh de Burgh was in charge of guarding Arthur and refused to let him be mutilated, but to demoralise Arthur's supporters was to announce his death. The circumstances of Arthur's death are unclear, though he probably died in 1203.

In about 1207, after having conquered Normandy, Philip II Augustus ordered the building of a new cylindrical keep. It was later named the Talbot Tower (Tour Talbot) after the English commander responsible for its repair during the Hundred Years' War. It is a tall round tower, a similar design to the towers built at Gisors and the medieval Louvre.

Possession of the castle changed hands several times during the Hundred Years' War. In 1424, the constable of the Castle of "Faleys" was recorded as John Walkare, son of Robert Walker of Bedale.

The castle was deserted during the 17th century.

Since 1840, Château de Falaise has been recognised as a monument historique by the French Ministry of Culture. A programme of restoration was carried out between 1870 and 1874. The castle suffered due to bombardment during the Second World War in the battle for the Falaise pocket in 1944, but the three keeps were unscathed.

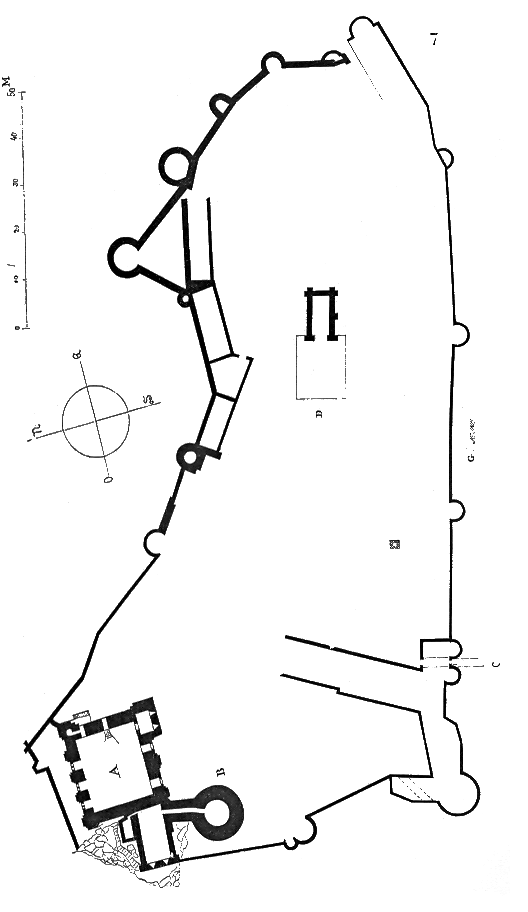
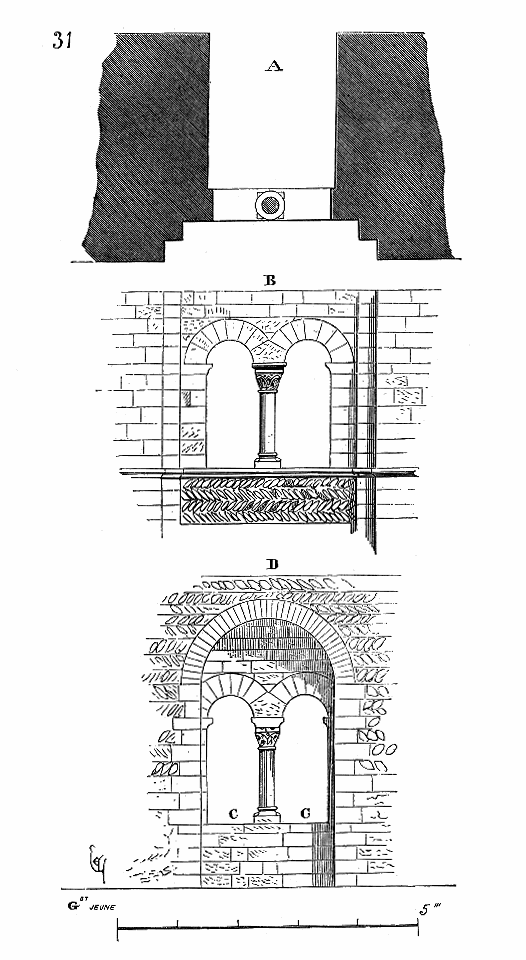
Overview of the enclosure of the castle, drawn by Viollet-le-Duc (left image), and detail of a window, from the Dictionnaire of Eugène Viollet-le-Duc (right image)

== Gallery ==
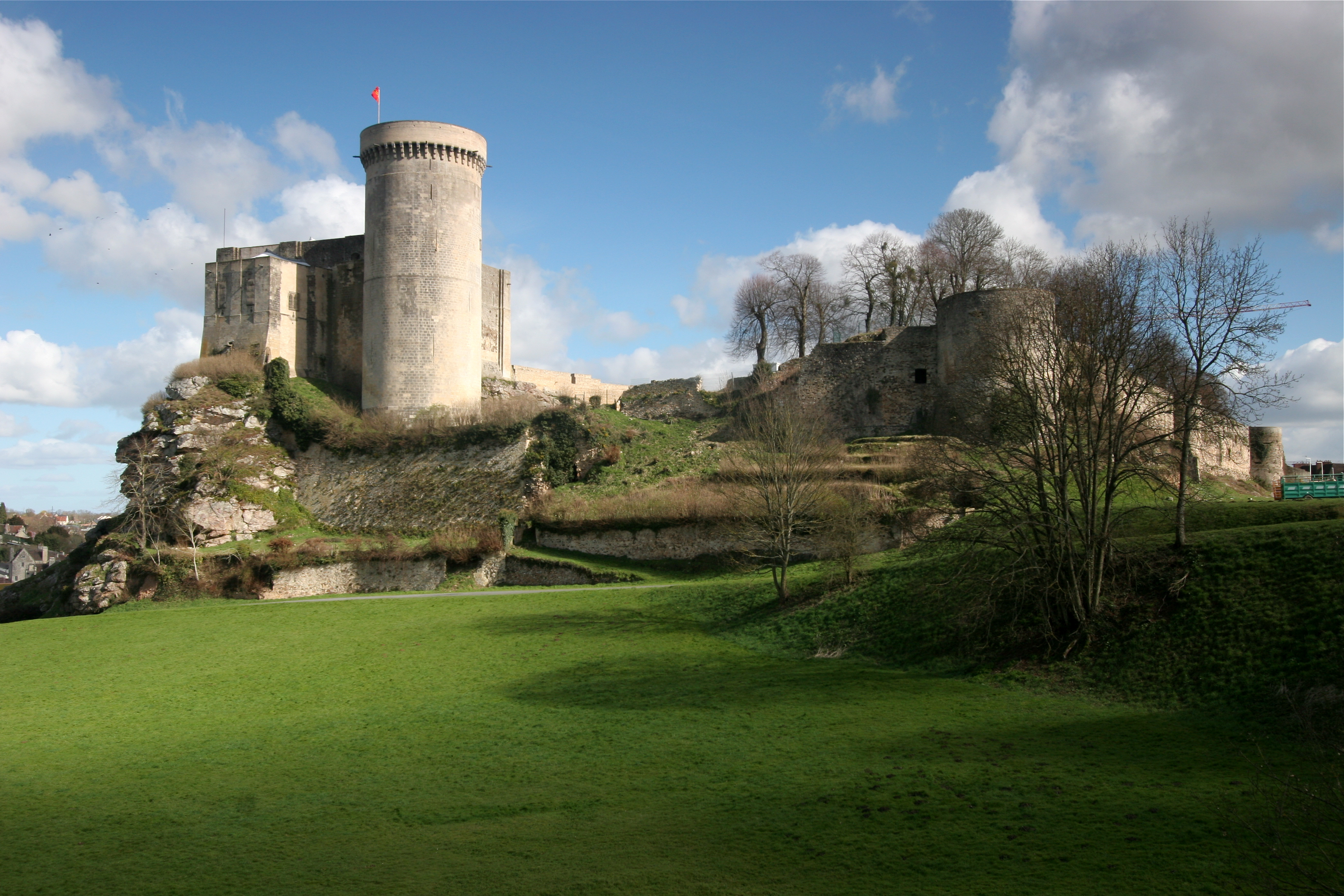
The castle of Falaise.

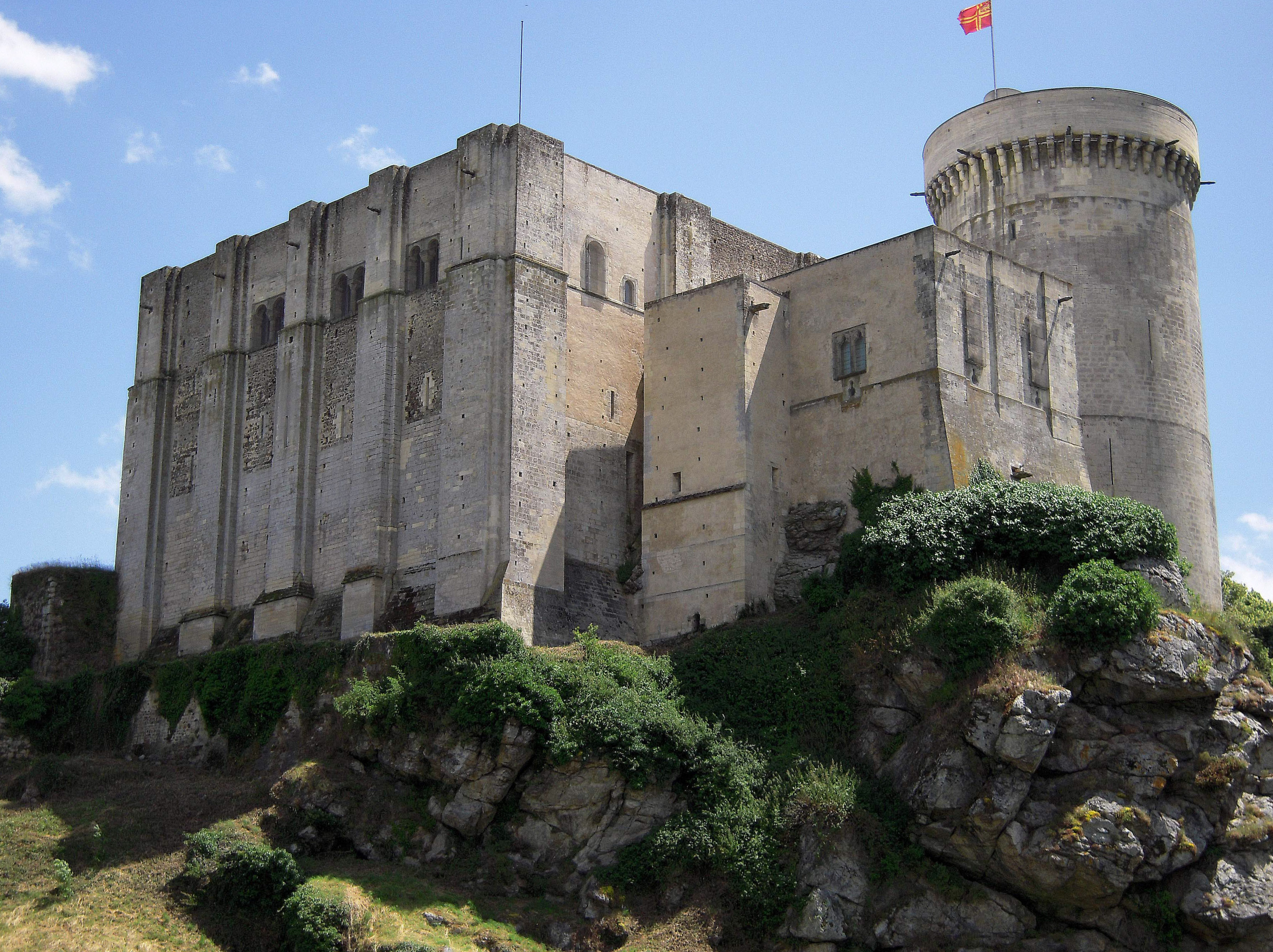
The keeps.

The flag of Falaise, birthplace of William the Conqueror.

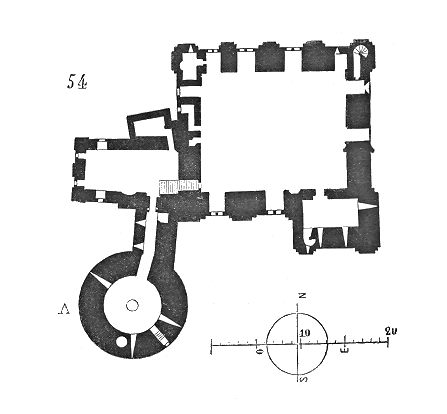
Plan of the keeps.

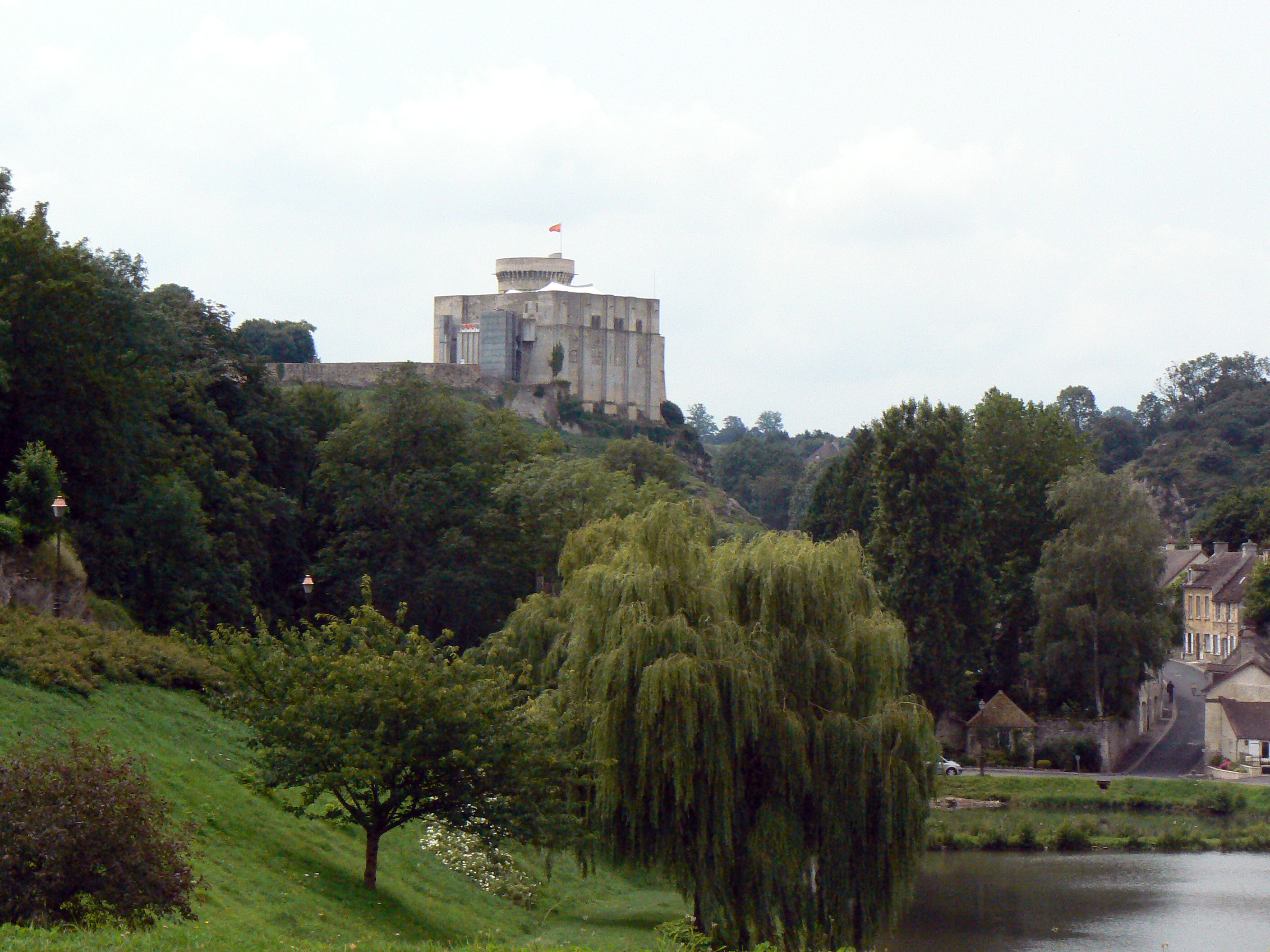
View of the castle of Falaise showing its modern concrete entrance tower.

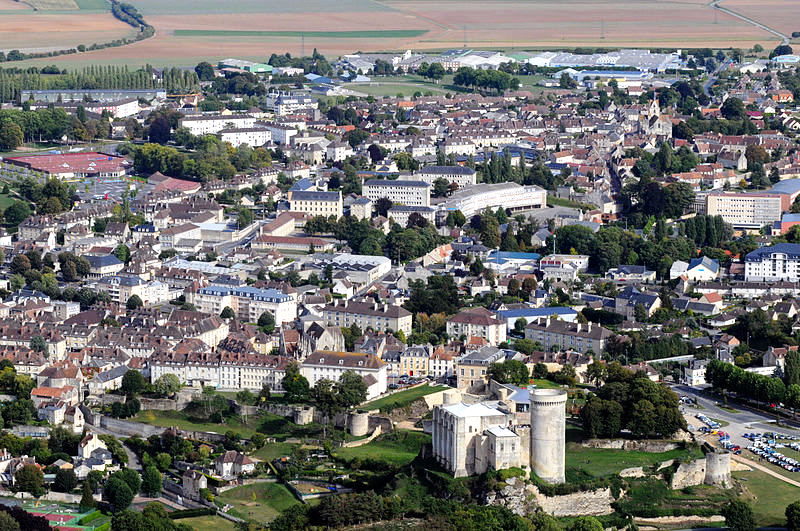
Aerial view of the castle and the city of Falaise.

== See also ==
- List of castles in France
