= Breteuil =

Breteuil may refer to:

== Places in France ==
- Breteuil, Eure, in the Eure département; alternative name Breteuil-sur-Iton
  - Siege of Breteuil in 1346 during the Hundred Years' War
- Breteuil, Oise, in the Oise département; alternative name Breteuil-sur-Noye
  - Breteuil Abbey, Oise
- Château de Breteuil, southwest of Paris, in the Yvelines département

== People ==
- Baron de Breteuil
- Emilie de Breteuil, marquise du Chatelet
- Henri Le Tonnelier de Breteuil (1848-1916), French aristocrat and politician
