= Cintray =

Cintray may refer to communes in France:

- Cintray, Eure
- Cintray, Eure-et-Loir

== See also ==
- Cintra (disambiguation)
- Cintré, in the Ille-et-Vilaine département
- Cintrey, in the Haute-Saône département
