= Rue François-I =

French street

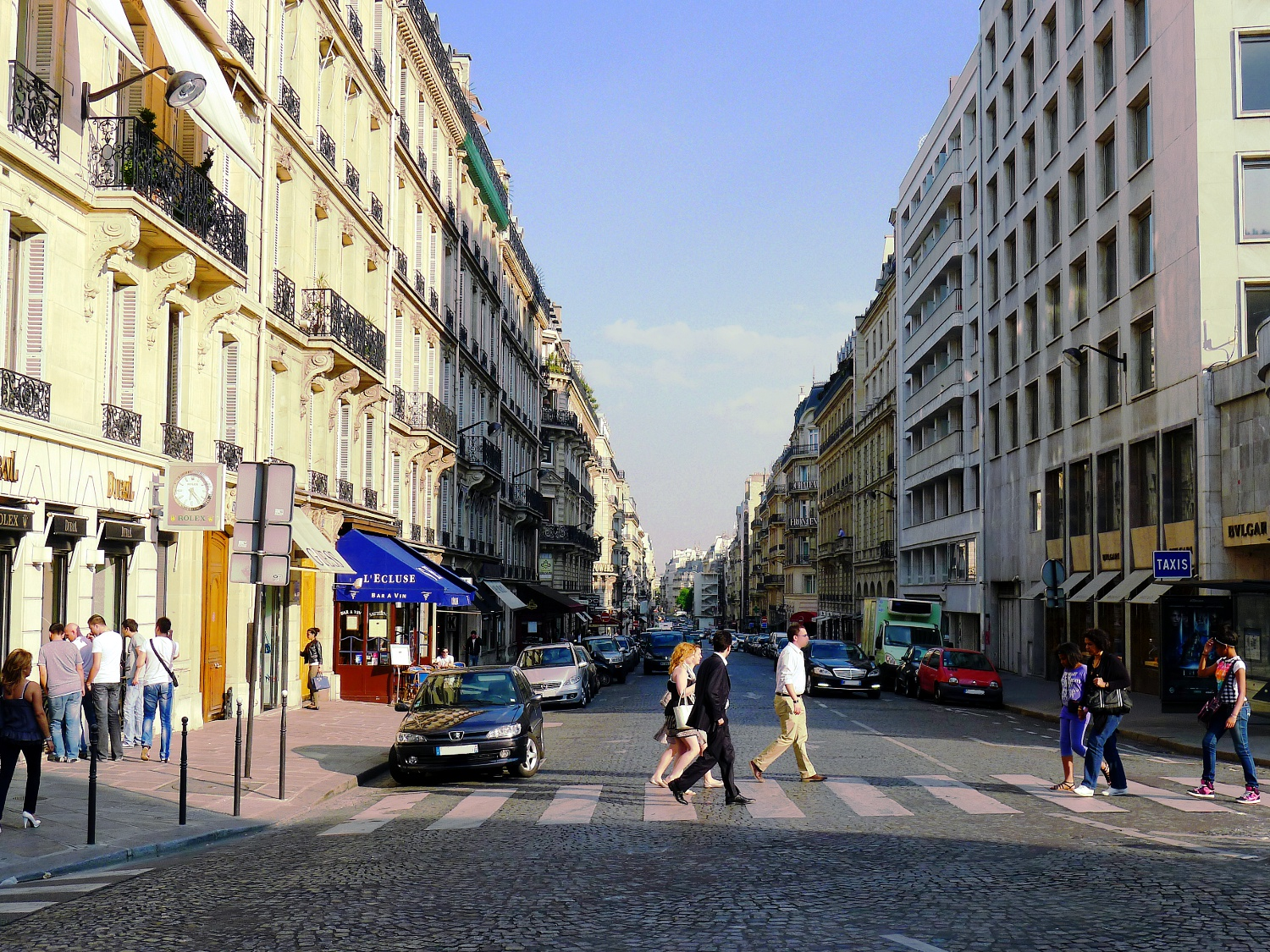
- Rue François-I seen from the Avenue George-V
- Interactive map of Rue François-I
- Length: 850 m (2,790 ft)
- Width: 20 m
- Area: Start: 1 Franklin D. Roosevelt Avenue and Place du Canada; End: Place Paul-Émile-Victor and 16 Quentin-Bauchart Street
- Location: Champs-Élysées
- Arrondissement: 8th
- Quarter: Champs-Élysées
- Coordinates: 48°52′04″N 2°18′18″E

Construction
- Construction start: May 4, 1861

The Rue François-I is a street in the 8th arrondissement of Paris, located in the heart of the Golden Triangle district.

== Location and access ==
It begins at the level of 1, Avenue Franklin-D.-Roosevelt and the Place du Canada, and ends at the Avenue George V. In the southern quarter of its length, it crosses the Place François-I.

== Origin of the name ==
It bears this name because of its proximity to the Place François-I.

== History ==
A Société des Champs-Élysées, created by Colonel Brack and Mr. Constantin in 1823, undertook the development of a new district located between the Allée d’Antin (Avenue Franklin-D.-Roosevelt), the Cours la Reine (Cours Albert-I), and the Allée des Veuves (Avenue Montaigne).

The district was called François I because Colonel Brack had installed, on a house known as the House of François I located at the corner of the Cours la Reine and the Rue Bayard, a façade taken from a house that was said to have been built by the Renaissance monarch for the Duchess of Étampes.

A second subdivision, known as Chaillot, was then created near the Arc de Triomphe. Nevertheless, the district was slow to be built up. Its development only began with the creation of the Rue François-I, by ordinance of 4 May 1861, which connected the two subdivisions. It was immediately built up with private mansions or income-producing buildings intended for the upper bourgeoisie and the aristocracy of the Second Empire.

== Buildings and places of memory ==
- At an unknown number lived former President Valéry Giscard d’Estaing, in an apartment paid for by the State.
- At an unknown number died the French engineer, industrialist, and businessman Pierre-Ernest Dalbouze.

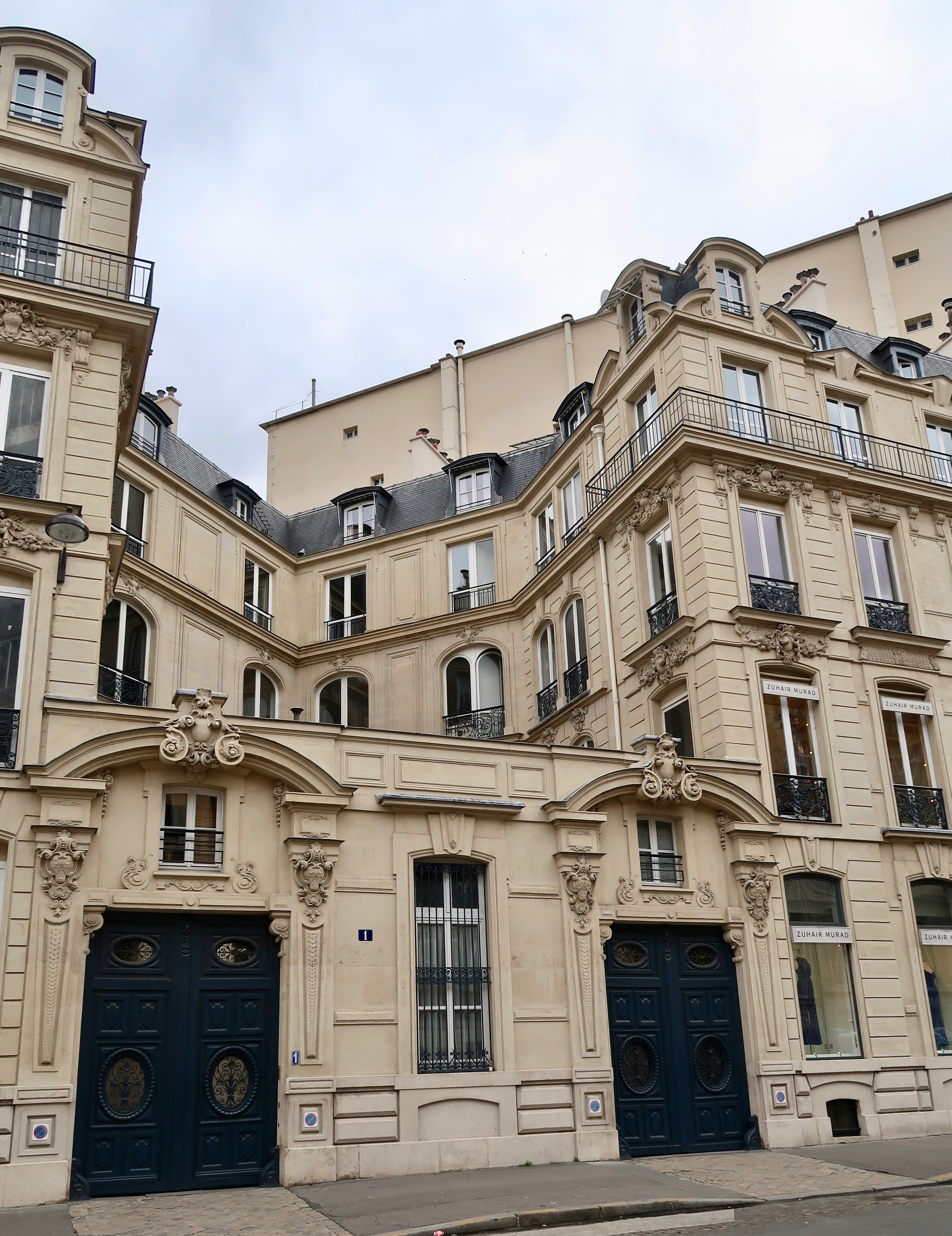
No. 1

=== No. 1 ===
Agénor de Gramont (1851–1925), Duke of Guiche, and the Duchess, born Marguerite de Rothschild (1855–1905), settled in this building after their marriage in 1878 and before moving in 1888 into a private mansion on the Rue de Constantine, then the Rue de Chaillot: "A small apartment arranged according to the poor taste that characterized the second half of the 19th century: everywhere there are nothing but hangings and plush fabrics placed by the fashionable upholsterer, Pijassou. The living room is buttercup yellow with blue carpets, the dining room Henri II style, a small classical smoking room for Agénor, and a rough washroom, with a black loft and striped calico fabric hiding the toilet items, for Marguerite: everything in the furnishings of the house reveals a lack of sensitivity on the part of the young couple. There is not a single work of art to embellish the shelves or the walls, which are only hung with family portraits. 'Elegance played on values other than those of furniture': although not very wealthy […] the Guiches had two or three valets, magnificent horses, and often entertained their friends at dinner." In 1888, the private mansion at 1, Rue François-I was acquired by Professor Odilon Lannelongue and his wife. No. 1 had the advantage over the other buildings on the street of having a direct view of the Seine, with the windows of the main living room opening directly onto the Cours Albert-I (Cours la Reine at the time). Great travelers, the Lannelongues furnished their residence with all kinds of furniture and works of art coming particularly from Venice, where they went every year. Following the death of Marie Lannelongue in 1906 and of Odilon Lannelongue in 1911, their nieces, Marie and Laure Lannelongue, inherited ownership of the mansion in the spring of 1912. Their young husbands, both from Agen, did not wish to keep a building of this size in Paris, requiring major and costly renovation work on the cellars and foundations following the floods of 1910. Finally, the noise of traffic on the Cours la Reine became increasingly troublesome with the popularization of the automobile. All of this led the two sisters to convert the mansion into an income-producing building. They therefore divided the building into apartments, which they then rented out, until the resale of the building in the 1930s. Today, the building is occupied exclusively by offices, including, in 2013, the Embassy of South Sudan.

=== No. 3 ===
The actor Alain Delon lived here.

=== No. 5 ===
In 1907, the Embassy of the United States was located here.

=== No. 7 ===
At this address is a property belonging to the clan of former Gabonese president Ali Bongo.

During the 20th century, Prince and collector Wladimir Argoutinsky-Dolgoroukoff owned a private mansion at this address.

=== Nos. 8–10 ===
The Adveniat Paris youth hostel is located at no. 8. The history of this place is closely linked to that of the Assumptionist congregation founded by Emmanuel d’Alzon in 1861.

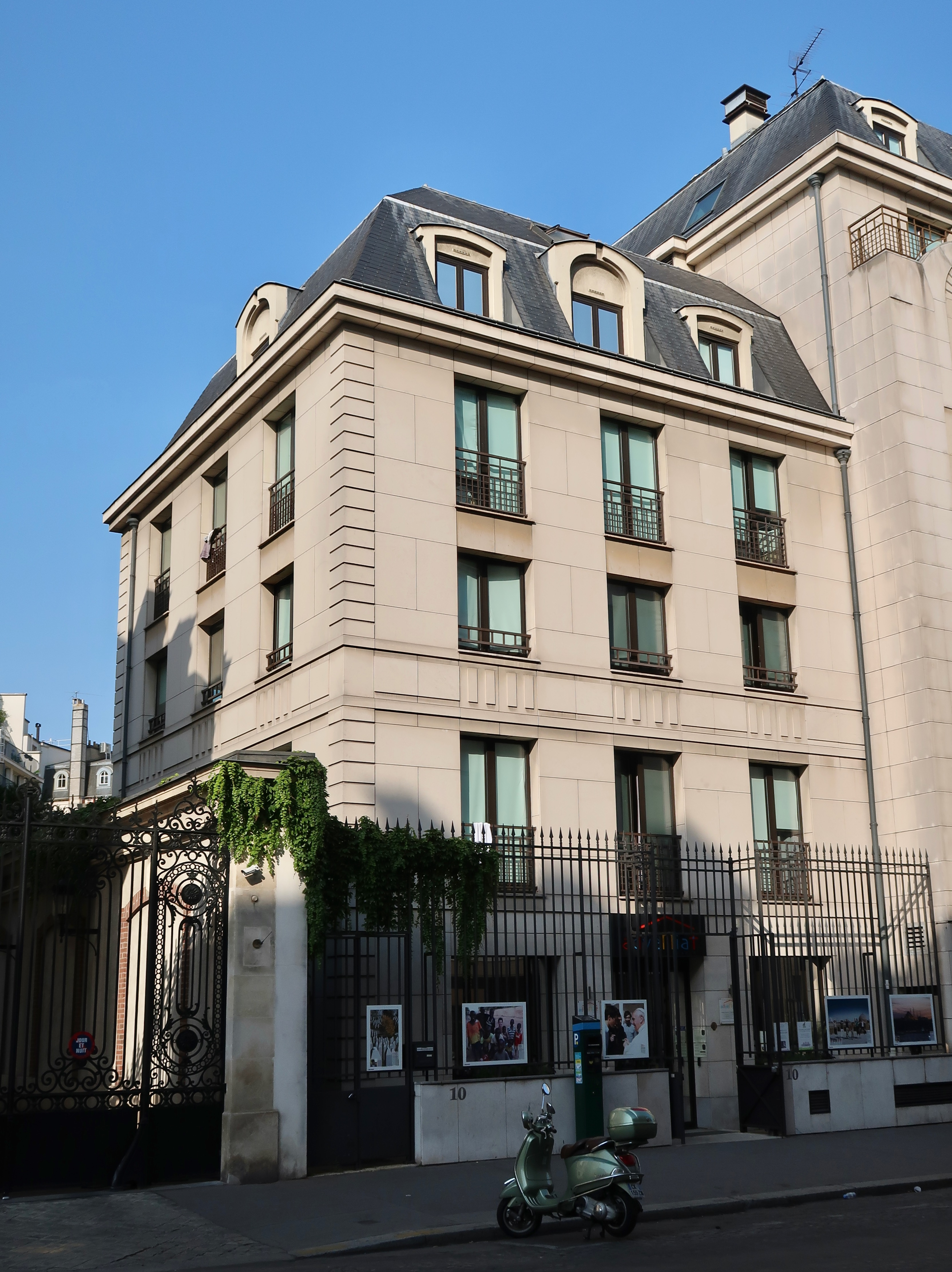
Adveniat Home

=== From no. 9 to no. 60 ===
- No. 9: Hôtel de Vilgruy: A mansion built in 1865 by the architect Henri Labrouste. "The construction attracts attention only through the notoriety of its author and the ingenuity of its interior layout." Hôtel of the Countess Foucher de Careil (in 1910). Classified as a historic monument by decree of 19 February 1981. (Note: "Facades and roofs of the hotel and its outbuildings; staircase with banister; small and large lounges, dining rooms on the first and second floors with their decor (cad. AK 18).")

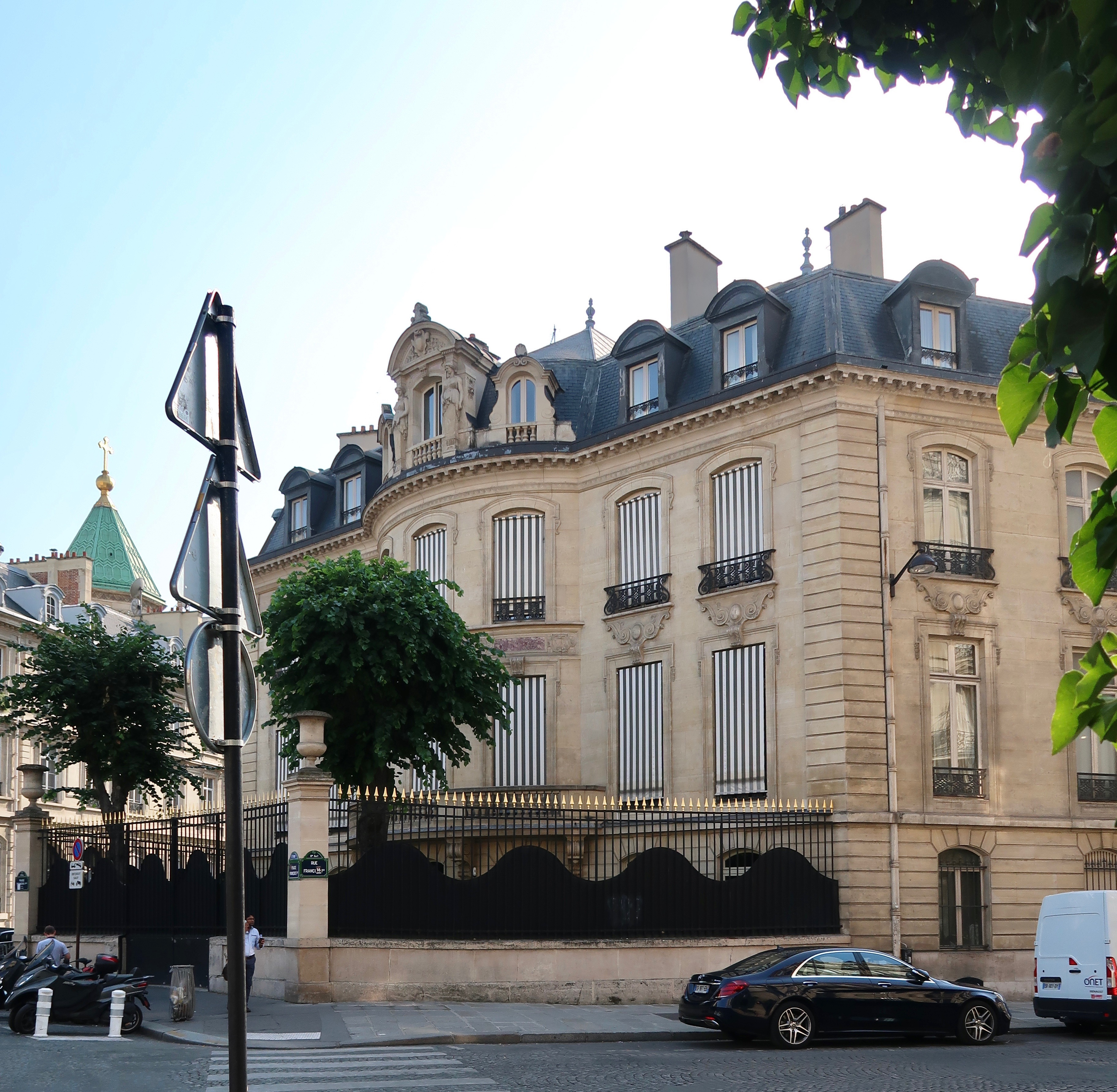
Hôtel de Vilgruy (1865) (listed building)

- No. 11: Hôtel of Baron Hans von Bleichröder (in 1910): Built on 21 August 1897 by the architect G. Rousseau. Headquarters and studios of Radio-Paris from 1933 to 1940. "French Broadcasting installed studios there" (in 1953).
- No. 11bis: Hôtel of Mrs. Demachy (in 1910).
- No. 12: Hôtel de Clermont-Tonnerre: Built in 1880 in the Neo-Renaissance style. Formerly the Hôtel Laurent, then that of Count Raoul Chandon de Briailles and his wife, Countess Blanche de Clermont-Tonnerre (in 1910). "It is here […], reports André Becq de Fouquières, that on 4 June 1912, dressed as a rajah and wearing a turban with a white aigrette, I announced the arrivals at the unforgettable Persian ball of Countess Blanche de Clermont-Tonnerre—which had a profound influence on fashion and inspired […] Paul Poiret." After housing the Lucile Manguin fashion house, then an art gallery, the mansion was acquired in 1978 by couturier Pierre Cardin, who carefully restored the interiors and installed his haute couture house there from 1988 to 1994. The ground floor (5–7, Place François-I) was leased from 1994 to 2006 to the antique dealer Maurice Ségoura, who installed his shop there over an area of 720 m². Nowadays, it is the headquarters of Artémis, the personal holding company of François Pinault.
- No. 13: The Christian Dior fashion house is installed in the former mansion of the Countess of Béarn. Residence, at the time of his death on 29 June 1888, of the banker Charles-Adolphe Demachy (1818–1888), Regent of the Bank of France and founder of the bank bearing his name, then residence of Robert Demachy.
- No. 18: Hôtel Stenart: French Broadcastin had installed studios there (in 1953).
- No. 21: Hôtel of the Marquis de Chabert d’Ansac (in 1910). Later occupied by the French Red Cross.
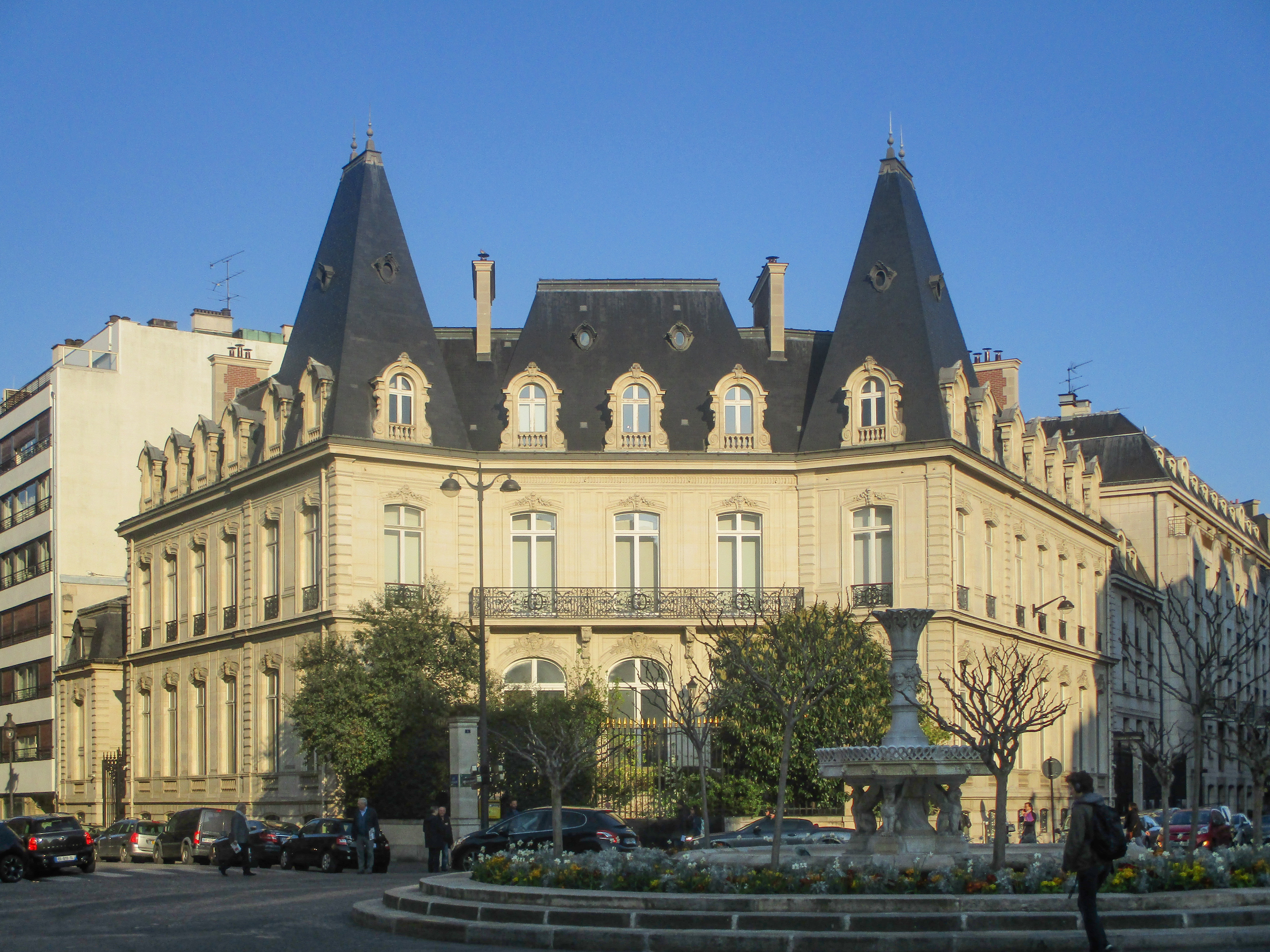
Hôtel de Clermont-Tonnerre, at the intersection with the square

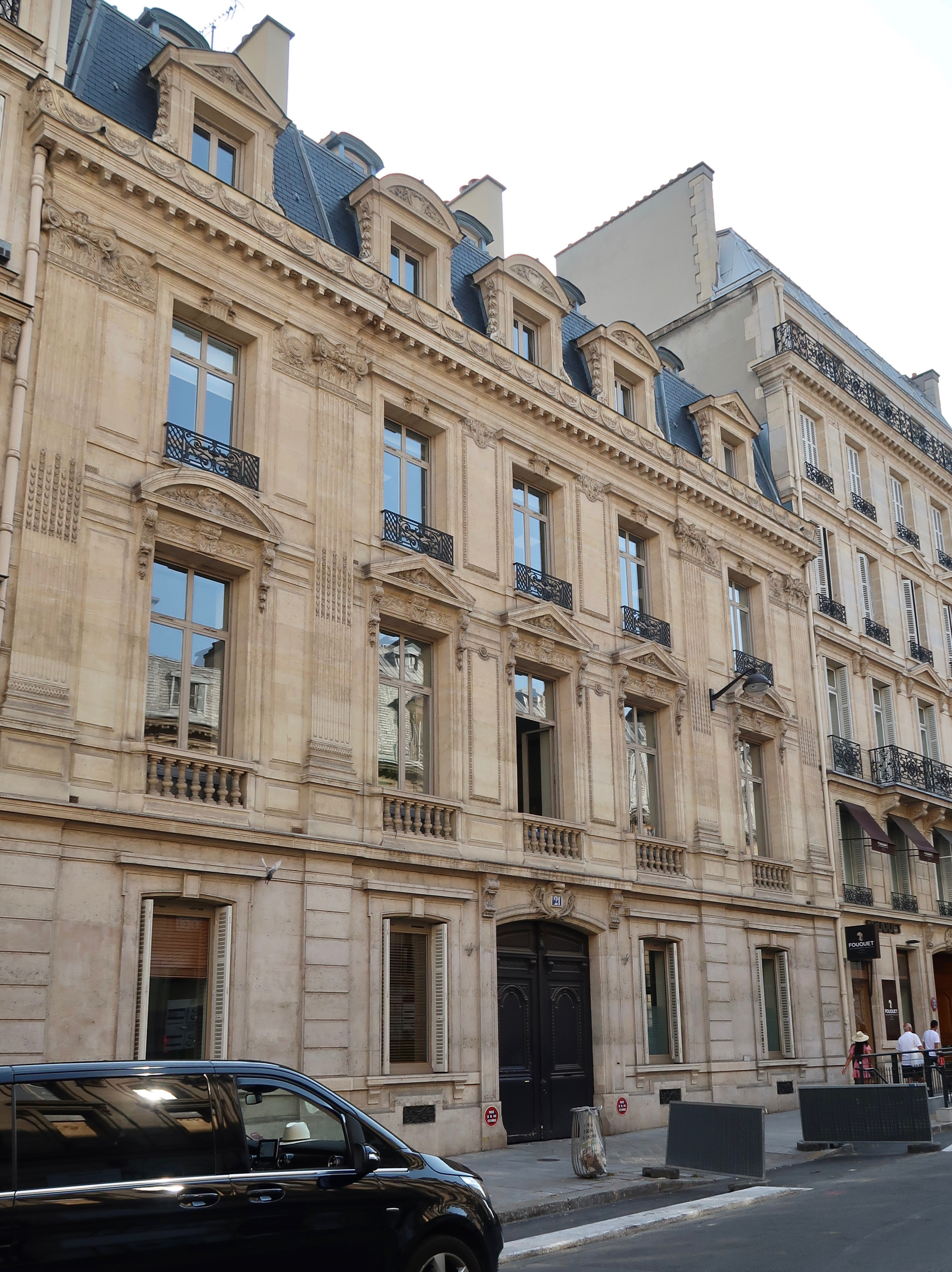
Hôtel Chabert d'Ansac, at no. 21
- No. 24: First apartment of Alfred and Lucie Dreyfus, married on 18 April 1890. The actress Yvonne de Bray (1887–1954) lived here in an apartment until her death on 1 February 1954.
- No. 26bis: Former headquarters and studios of Europe 1, Virgin Radio, RFM, and MCM, from 1955 to 2018.
- No. 28: Hôtel of the Marquis de Breteuil until 1902. Former studios of Europe 1 and Canal J until 2018.
- No. 30: Hôtel of Mrs. P. Mantin (in 1910), former studios of Europe 1.
- No. 31: Pierre Quentin-Bauchart, a member of the Paris Municipal Council, after whom the Rue Quentin-Bauchart is named, was born here in 1881. Vionnet boutique.
- No. 32: Hôtel of the Count of Pange (in 1910). "The Hôtel de Pange", wrote André Becq de Fouquières in 1953, "is still the residence of this Pange family attached to the memory of Madame de Staël." It housed the studios of Europe 1 for sixty-two years, until 2018. The four private mansions (26bis, 28, 30, and 32) were sold by the Lagardère group for less than €300 million to the Ardian Real Estate fund in March 2018. The buildings were subsequently completely restructured to accommodate luxury shops and offices.
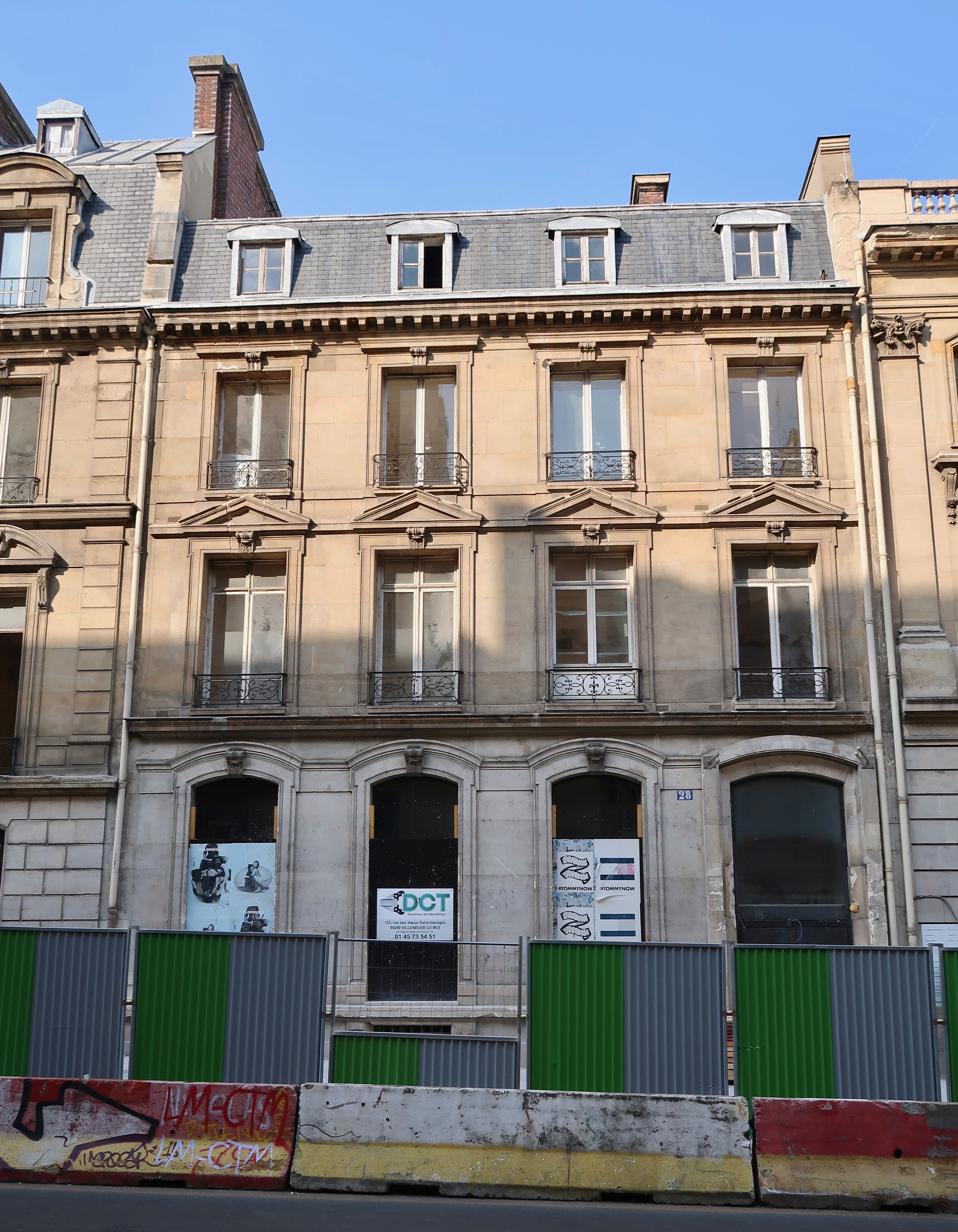
No. 28, former Hôtel Breteuil

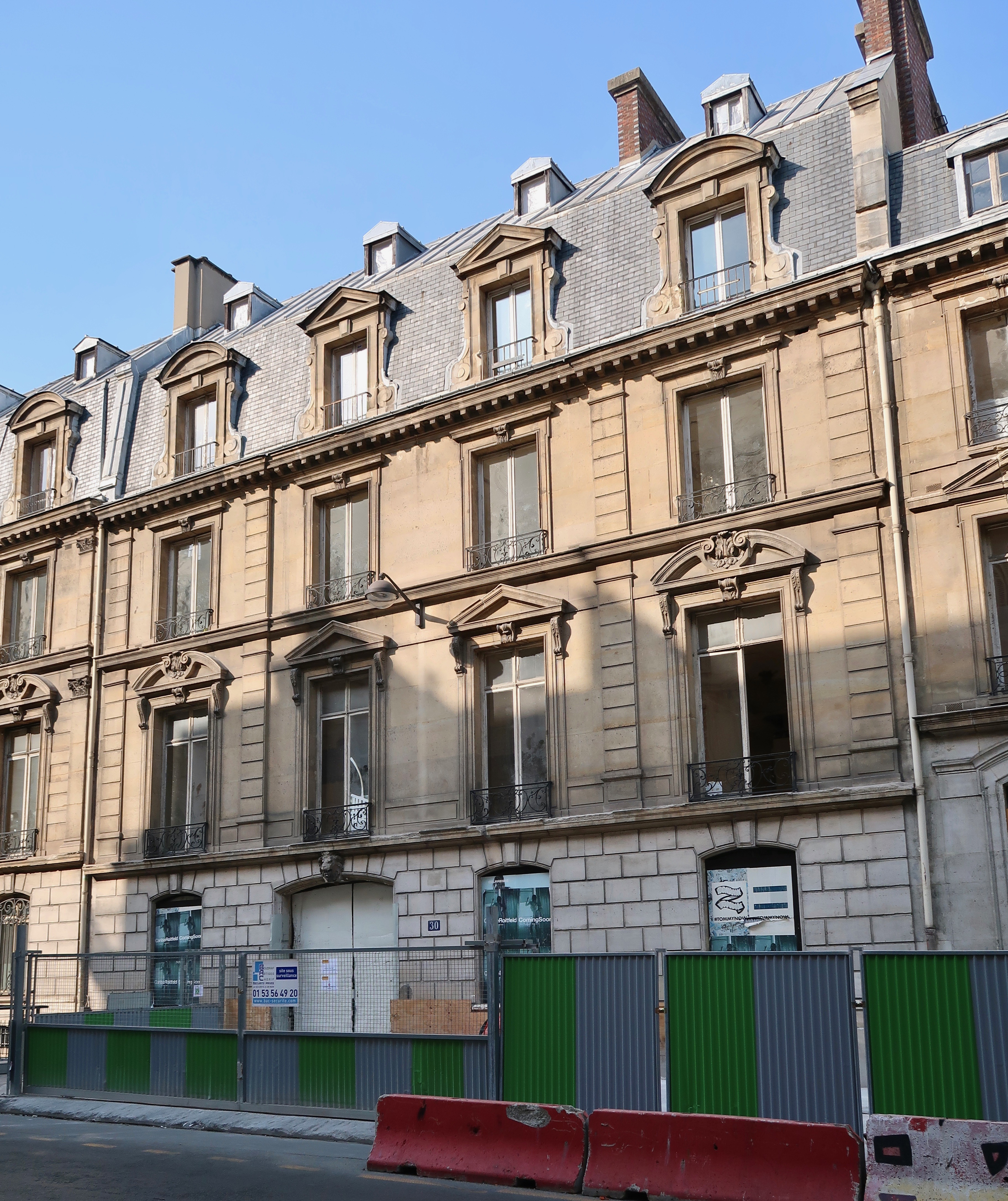
No. 30, former Hôtel Mantin

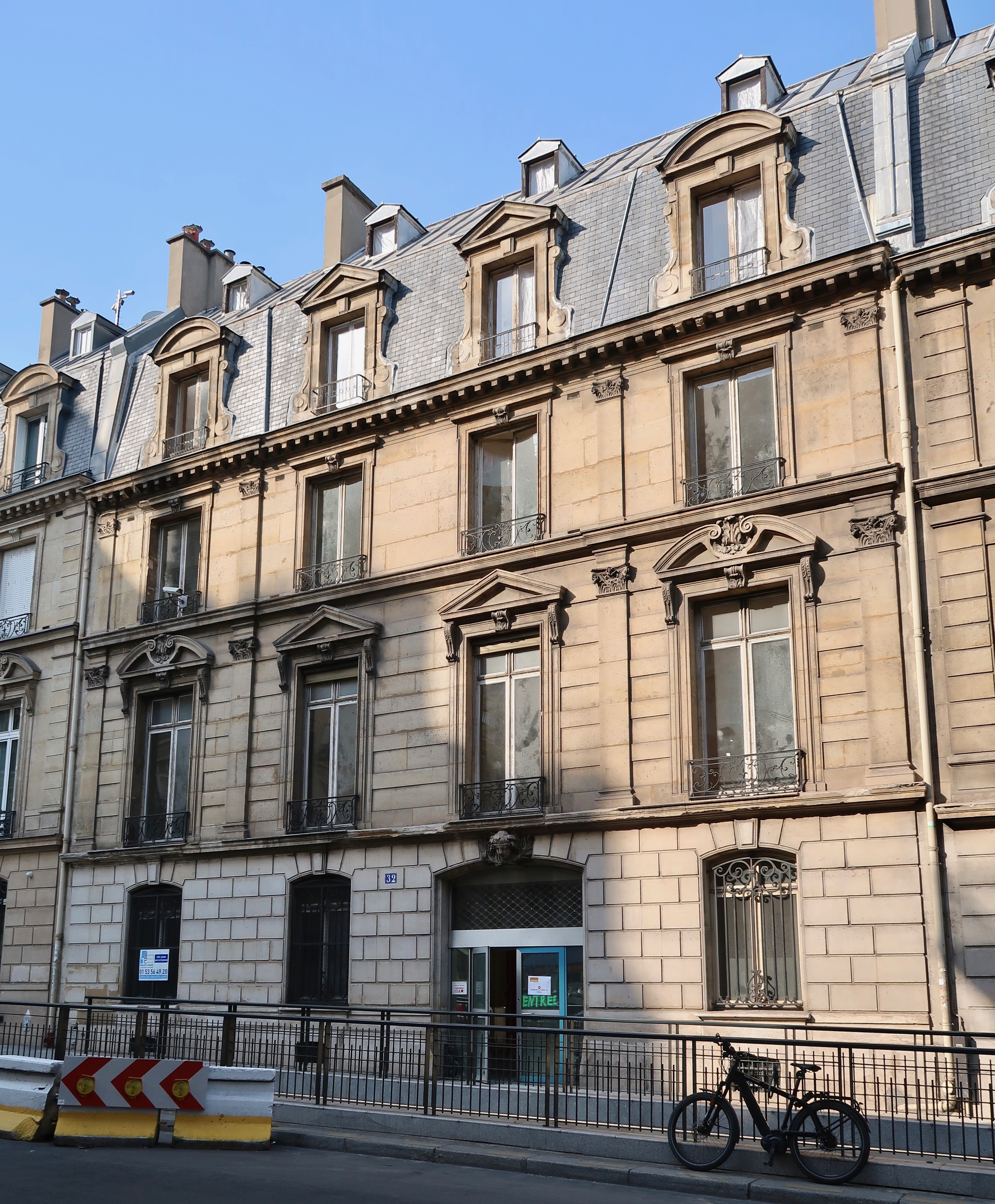
No. 32, former Hôtel de Pange
- No. 34: Hôtel of the Count of Ruillé (in 1910), today the residence of the Ambassador of Norway.
- No. 35: Former headquarters and studio of Radio 37 from 1937 to 1940.
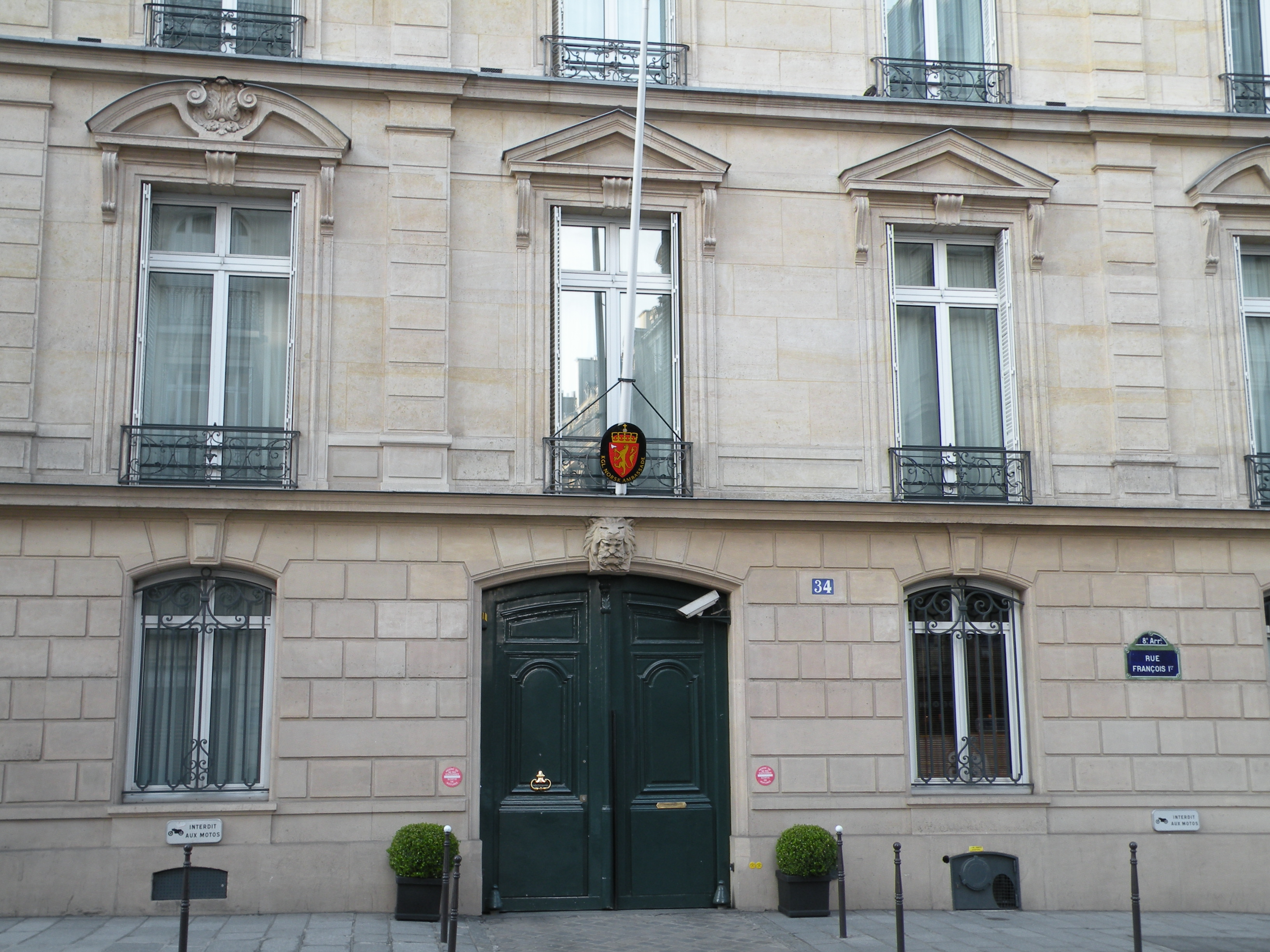
Hôtel de Ruillé, now the residence of the Norwegian ambassador

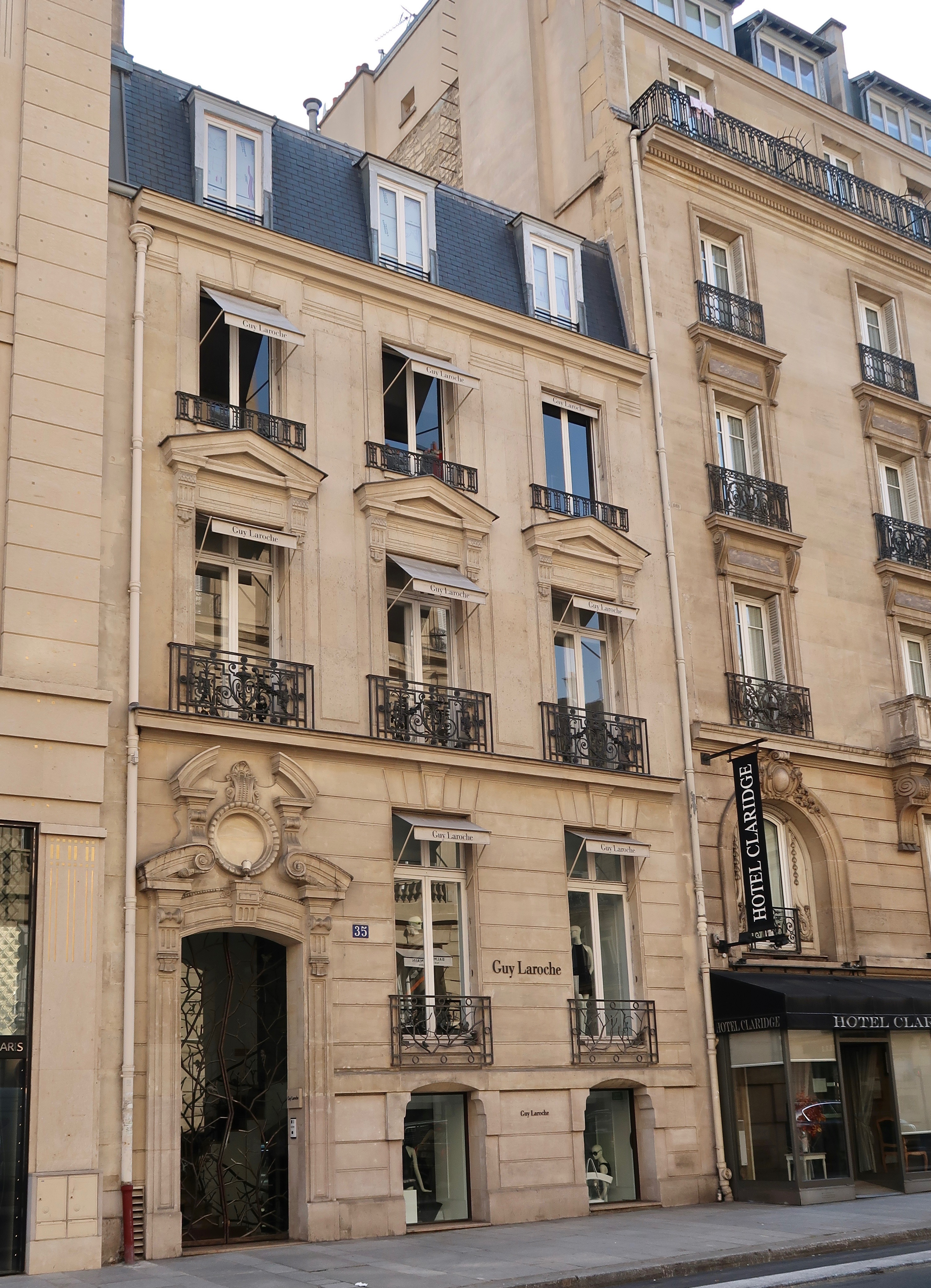
No. 35
- No. 37: "At No. 37, we encounter another name from the Polish aristocracy: that of Prince Lubomirski, who led a lavish and somewhat dissipated life, and who wrote poetry in French. I believe it was the formidable Aurélien Scholl who made this biting remark about the prince: 'He is not read, he is not handsome. Perhaps he is Mirski. One lies well when one comes from afar!'"
- No. 40: André Courrèges established his fashion house here in 1965.
- No. 44: Hôtel of Count Walewski (1810–1868). Home of the Pierre Balmain fashion house since the 1950s.

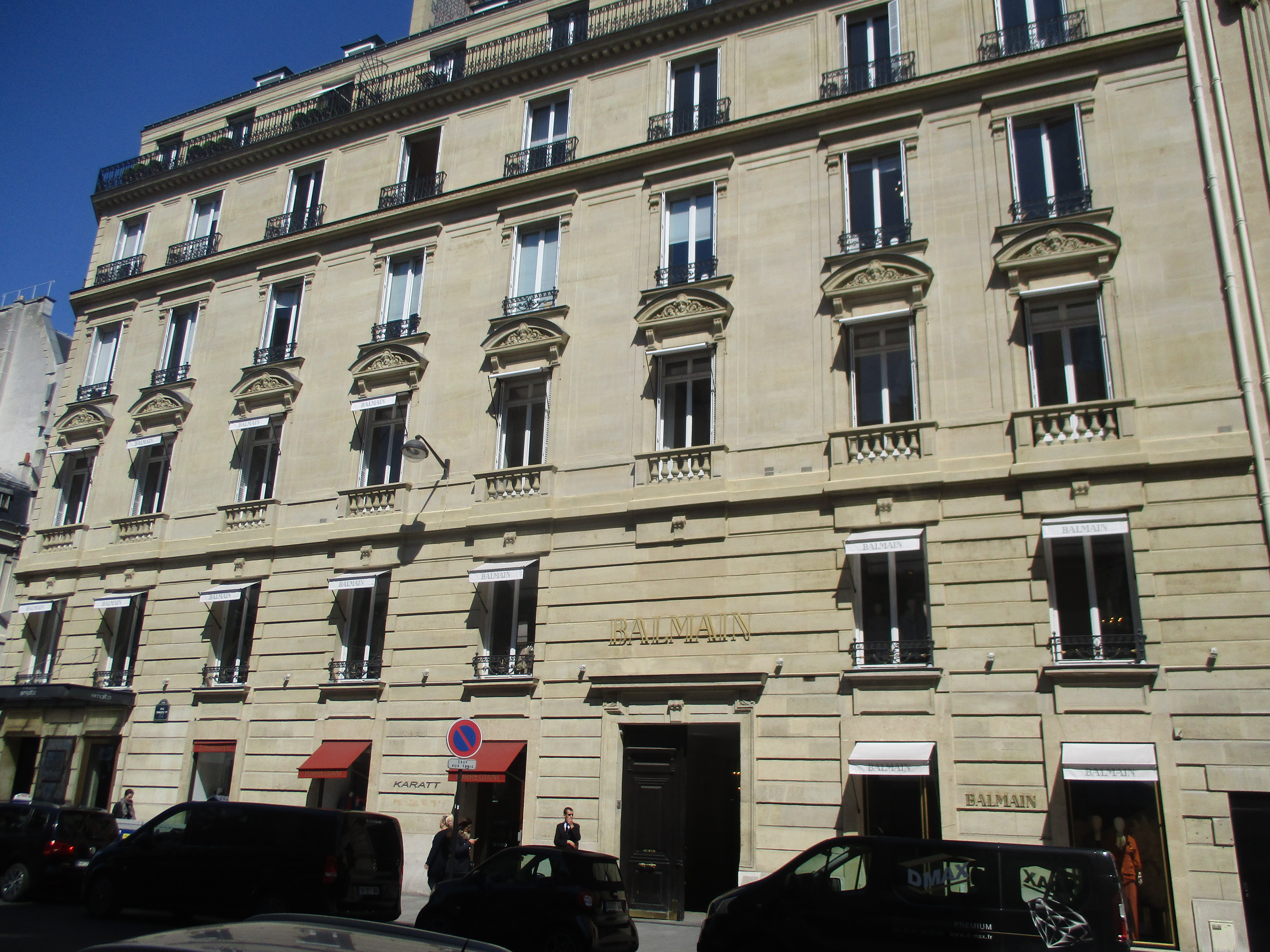
No. 44, Balmain House

- No. 48 (corner of the Rue Marbeuf): Hôtel of Mrs. A. Panckouke (in 1910).
- No. 50: The Romanian prince Michel Stourdza (1793–1884) lived here. He "had preserved the immense fortune acquired by his ancestors through the skillful administration of a vast province. The little Marseillaise Jane Hading benefited from this, since she owed to the prince's munificence the ability to wear the most sumptuous jewelry in Paris."
- No. 51: Hôtel of M. N. Terestschenko, property of Baroness Roger, also owner of the mansion (now destroyed) at no. 53 (in 1910).
- No. 52: Hôtel Grand Powers: It was in this hotel, in 1947, that the composer Henri Betti chose, for the song he had composed, the title C'est si bon from the list of ten titles proposed to him by lyricist André Hornez.
- No. 60: "In the early years of the 20th century, Count Le Hon still lived at no. 60. His name remains attached to this corner of Paris: the mansion of his ancestress, at the Rond-Point des Champs-Élysées, still stands."

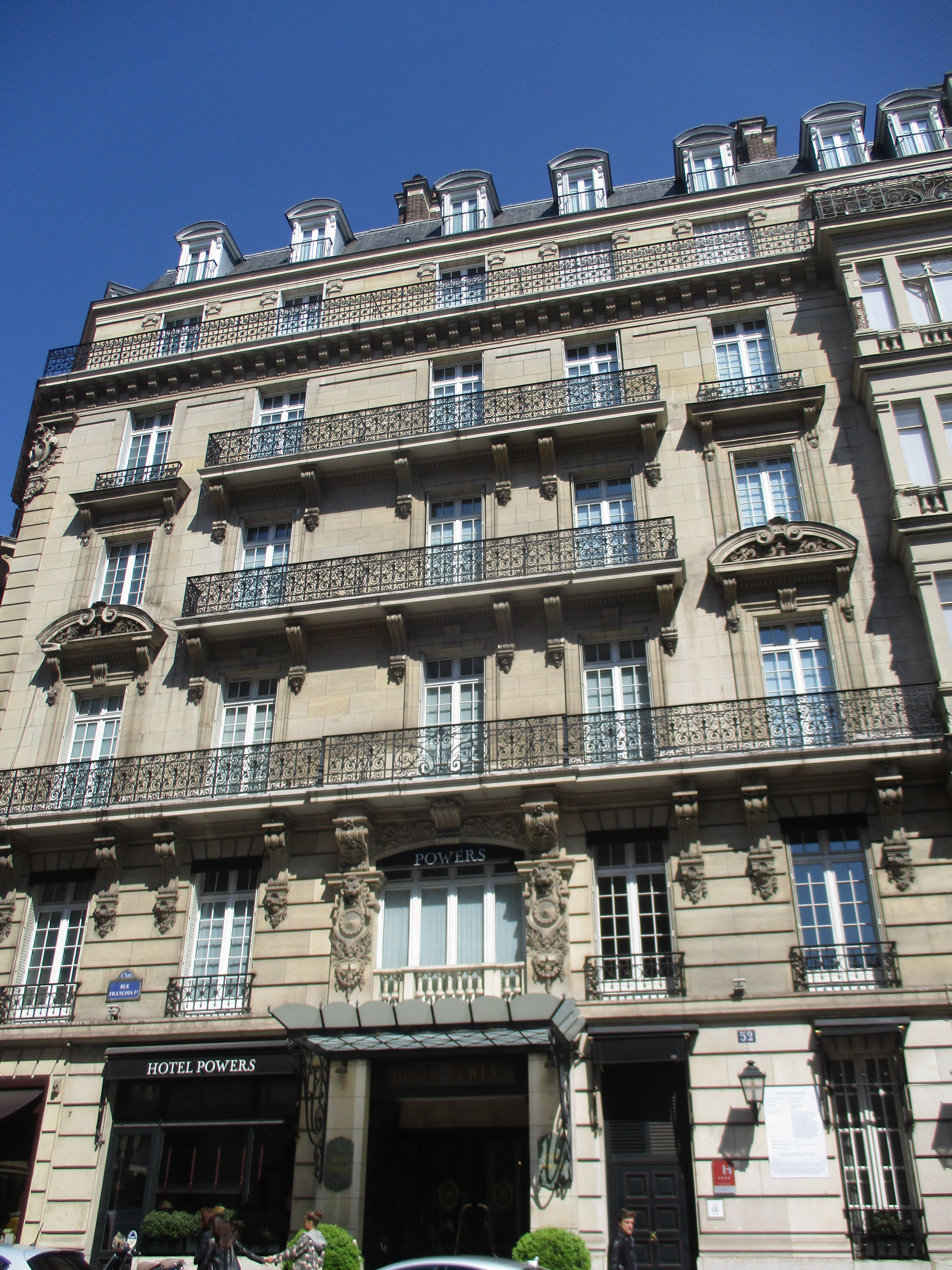
Powers Hotel, at no. 52

== Destroyed buildings ==
- No. 5: Hôtel of Mrs. Ridgway, then residence of the Ambassadors of the United States: Henry White (1907–1909), Robert Bacon (1909–1912), and Myron Timothy Herrick (1912–1914). During the First World War, it housed the headquarters of the American Relief Clearing House, founded by the latter in order to coordinate the activities of American charitable associations, which collected several million francs until 1917, the year the United States entered the war. It is currently a recent building, which notably houses the headquarters of the company Financière Lov, owned by Stéphane Courbit.
- No. 17: Hôtel of Baron Le Vavasseur.
- No. 33: Mansion belonging to the Count of Franqueville (in 1910).
- No. 53: Hôtel of Baron Roger, built between 1898 and 1905 by Walter-André Destailleur. "It became the headquarters of various international organizations and of the Sporting Club" (in 1953).
- Nos. 55–57: Hôtel Lebaudy, built by Ernest Sanson for the industrialist Pierre Lebaudy. The latter had acquired the former Drouyn de Lhuys property and decided to have the building, which was in poor condition and no longer fashionable, demolished to build a new private mansion on the 960 m² plot. Cardinal Mathieu (1839–1908), a member of the Académie française, had a pied-à-terre there. "The Hôtel Lebaudy", wrote André Becq de Fouquières in 1953, "still belongs to Mrs. Pierre Lebaudy, née Luzarche d'Azay, and it was there that Cardinal Mathieu came to take refuge when he was driven from his bishopric in 1905 by the Law of Separation." (Note: Cardinal Mathieu had ceased to be Archbishop of Toulouse in 1899 when he was appointed cardinal. He was then called to Rome.) The widow of Pierre Lebaudy died in 1962. The mansion was then sold, demolished, and replaced by a modern building.

== See also ==
- 8th arrondissement of Paris
- Avenue George V

== Bibliography ==
- Becq de Fouquières, André (1953). Mon Paris et ses Parisiens [My Paris and its Parisians] (in French). Vol. I. Paris: Pierre Horay.
- de Rochegude, Félix (1910). Promenades dans toutes les rues de Paris. VIIIe arrondissement [Walks through all the streets of Paris. 8th arrondissement] (in French). Paris: Hachette.
