= Embassy of Ireland, Paris =

Diplomatic mission of Ireland to France

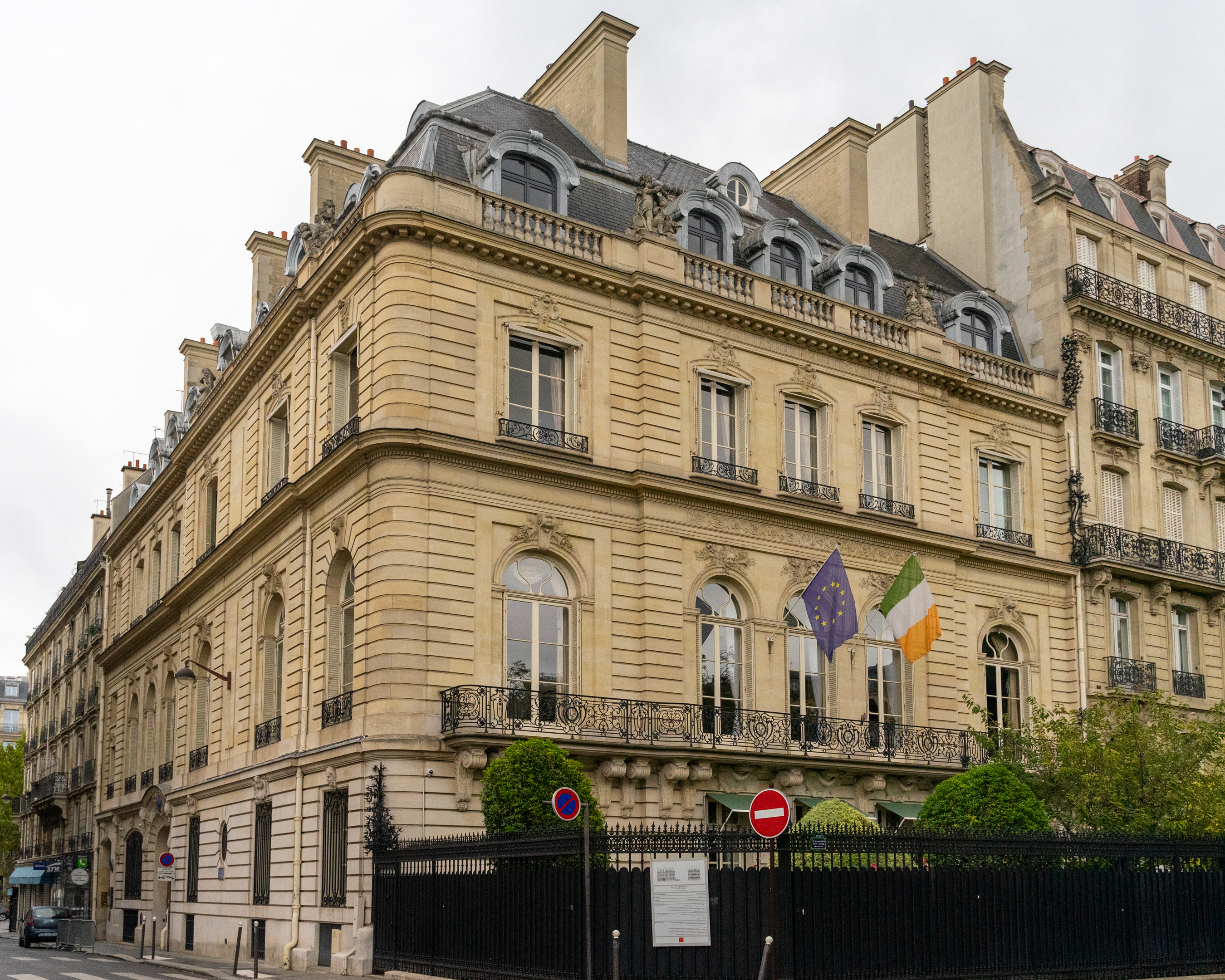
- Location: Paris
- Address: 12 Avenue Foch, Paris, 75116
- Coordinates: 48.8740752°N 2.2914557°E
- Ambassador: Niall Burgess
- Website: Irish Embassy, Paris

The Embassy of Ireland in Paris (French: Ambassade d'Irlande à Paris) is the diplomatic mission of Ireland to France. It is located at 12 Avenue Foch in the 16th arrondissement.

The embassy is accredited to Monaco.

As of April 2023, the ambassador to France is Niall Burgess.

== Building ==
Built in 1892 by architect Ernest Sanson as the Hôtel Particulier, the embassy is located in the historic Hôtel de Breteuil. The building was sold to the Irish Government in 1954 when the lease on the former Embassy on Rue Paul-Valery expired.

In 2006, the reception rooms of the chancery underwent extensive renovations.

== See also ==
- Foreign relations of France
- Foreign relations of the Republic of Ireland
- List of diplomatic missions of Ireland
