= Cintra (disambiguation) =

Cintra is an international operator of toll roads and car parks.

Cintra may also refer to:

== People ==
=== Given name ===
- Cintra Wilson (21st century), American celebrity writer

=== Surname ===
- Adriano Cintra (born 1972), Brazilian multi-instrumentist and producer
- Luís Lindley Cintra (1925-1991), Portuguese linguist
- Sebastião da Silveira Cintra (1882-1942), Brazilian prelate of the Roman Catholic Church
- Sousa Cintra (21st century), Portuguese businessman

== Places ==
- Cintra Bay or the Gulf of Cintra on the coast of Western Sahara.
- Cintra, Portugal, an alternate spelling for Sintra

== Other uses ==
- Cintra (ship), which wrecked on Porthminster Beach in 1893
- Cintra (New Hope, Pennsylvania), a historic house in Bucks County, Pennsylvania, U.S.
- Corporación Internacional de Transporte Aéreo, the former parent company for Aeroméxico, Mexicana de Aviación and Aeroperú

== See also ==
- Cintray, Eure, a commune in France
- Cintray, Eure-et-Loir, a commune in France
- Convention of Cintra, an 1808 treaty between France and the United Kingdom in the first stages of the Peninsula War
- da Cintra, a surname
- Sintra (disambiguation)
- The Elves of Cintra, a novel by Terry Brooks
