= Sintra (disambiguation) =

Sintra is both a town and a municipality in Portugal.

Sintra may also refer to:

- Sintra (Santa Maria e São Miguel, São Martinho e São Pedro de Penaferrim), a civil parish within the municipality
- Sintra Mountains
- Palace of Sintra
- Opel Sintra, a minivan

== See also ==
- Cintra (disambiguation)
- Santara (disambiguation)
- Pedro de Sintra
- Nova Sintra
- Sintra-Cascais Natural Park
- Convention of Cintra
