= La Guéroulde =

- Part of Breteuil
- Location of La Guéroulde
- Location within France Location within Normandy
- Coordinates: 48°48′56″N 0°53′18″E
- Country: France
- Region: Normandy
- Department: Eure
- Arrondissement: Bernay
- Canton: Breteuil
- Commune: Breteuil
- Area^{1}: 11.32 km^{2} (4.37 sq mi)
- Elevation: 180 m (590 ft)
- Highest elevation: 189 m (620 ft)
- Lowest elevation: 169 m (554 ft)
- Population (2023): 722
  - Density: 63.8/km^{2} (165/sq mi)
- Time zone: UTC+01:00 (CET)
  - Summer (DST): UTC+02:00 (CEST)
- Postal code: 27160
- ^{1} French Land Register data, which excludes lakes, ponds, glaciers > 1 km^{2} (0.386 sq mi or 247 acres) and river estuaries.

La Guéroulde (French pronunciation: [la ɡeʁuld]) is a former commune in the Eure department and Haute-Normandie region of France. On 1 January 2016, it was merged into the commune of Breteuil.

== See also ==
- Communes of the Eure department
