= Santara (disambiguation) =

Santara or Bhairarasa is a medieval ruling dynasty of Karnataka, India.

Santara may also refer to:

- Democratic National Freedom League, a political party of Lithuania established in 1917
- Santara Clinics: Vilnius University Hospital Santaros Clinics
- Santara (Pajevonys), village in Vilkaviškis District, Lithuania
- Santara (Virbalis), village in Vilkaviškis District, Lithuania

== See also ==
- Sintra (disambiguation)
