= Hôtel de Breteuil =

Coordinates: 48.8740°N 2.2915°E

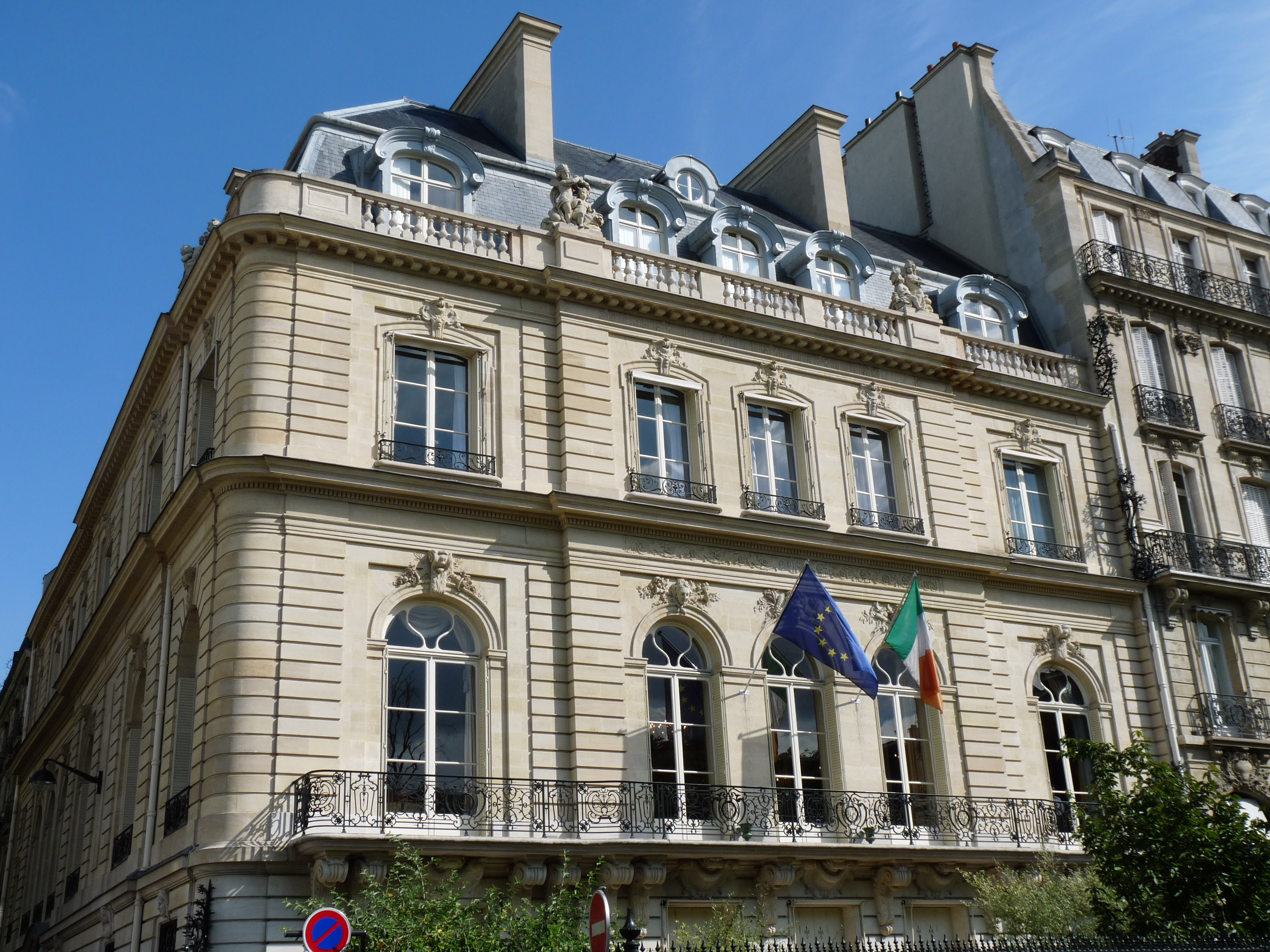
- The Hôtel de Breteuil in 2010
- Interactive map of the Hôtel de Breteuil area

General information
- Type: Hôtel particulier
- Architectural style: Rococo Revival
- Location: 12 Avenue Foch, Paris, France
- Completed: 1892

Design and construction
- Architect: Ernest Sanson

The Hôtel de Breteuil (French pronunciation: [otɛl də bʁətœj]) is a historic building in the 16th arrondissement of Paris, France.

== History ==
The hôtel particulier was built for Henri Le Tonnelier de Breteuil and his second wife. It was designed by architect Ernest Sanson, and its construction was completed in 1892.

During the Christmastime of 1858, the hotel hosted a chess match between the American master Paul Morphy and Adolf Anderssen, part of Morphy's tour of Tour of Europe. Morphy won the match handily, and Anderssen thrice employed an unusual opening—with mixed results—which came to bear his name.

After the death of the Marquis de Breteuil in 1916, the hotel was sold in 1919 to the Saint family, before becoming the residence of the Princess of Faucigny-Lucinge in 1937. During the Second World War, under the Occupation, the hotel housed the headquarters of the State Secretariat directed by Fernand de Brinon.

The building was acquired by the Irish State for £151,940 in 14 May 1957. It has since been the home for the Irish Embassy in France.

== Gallery ==
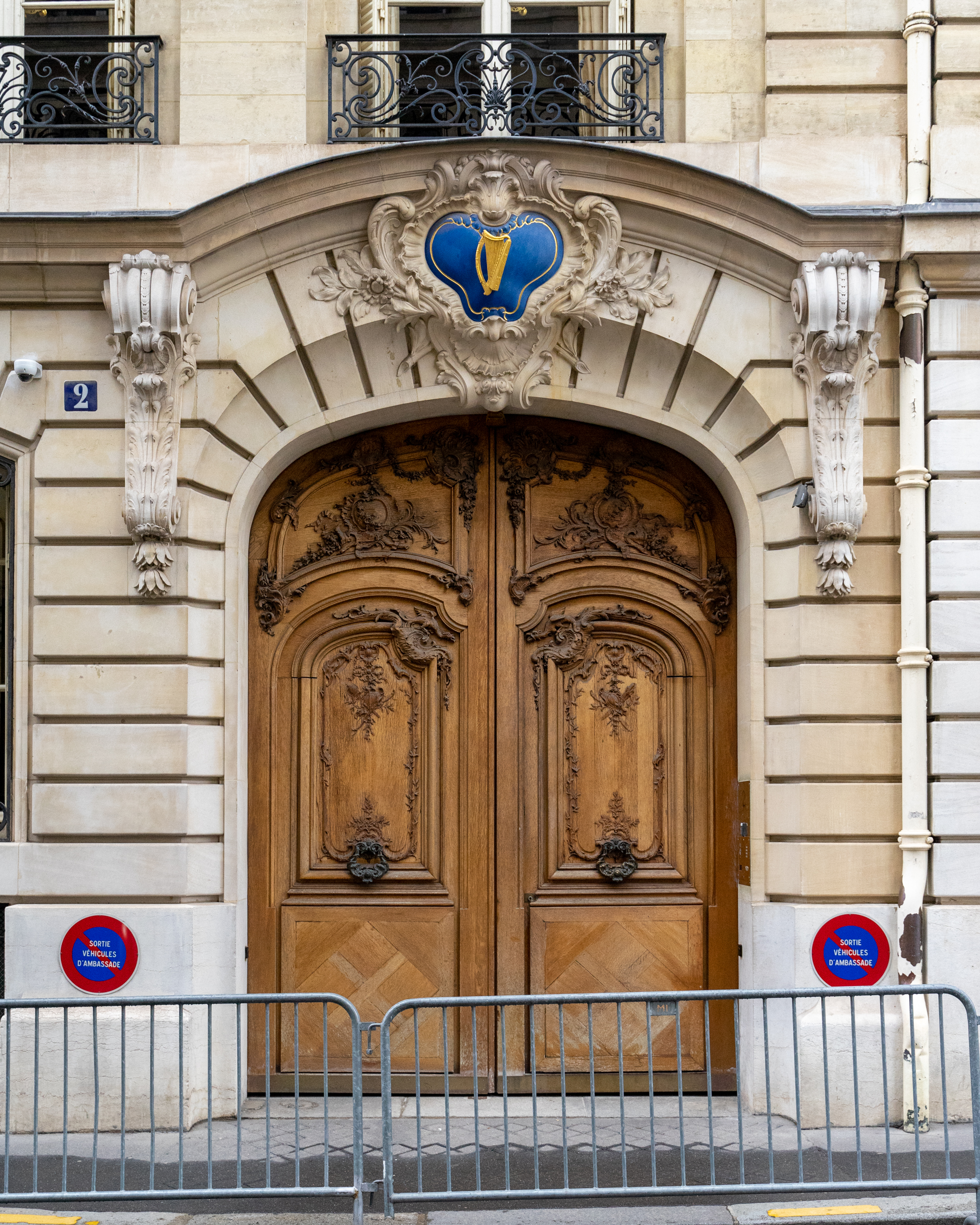
The Coat of arms of Ireland is featured above the entrance to the Embassy.

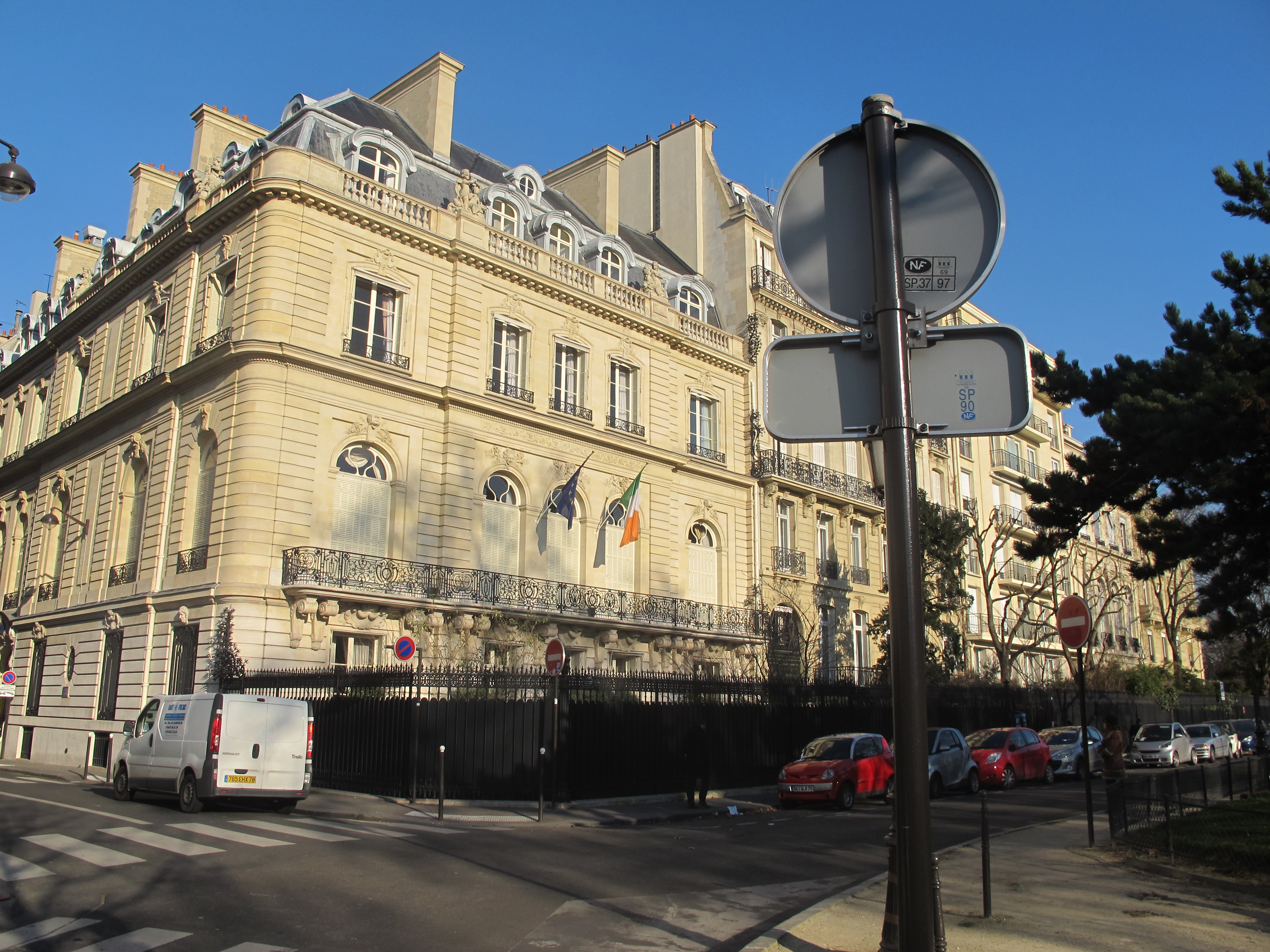
