= Siege of Breteuil =

1356 siege during the Hundred Years' War

- Part of the Edwardian Phase of the Hundred Years' War
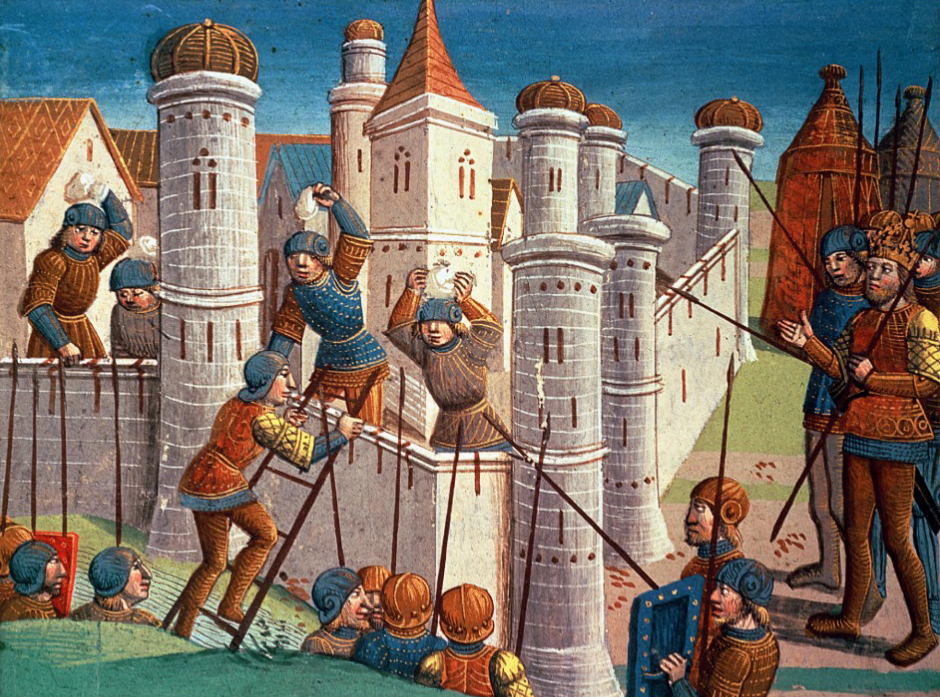
- A medieval depiction of a fortification being assaulted
Date	April – c. 20 August 1356
Location	Breteuil, Normandy 48°50′13″N 0°54′53″E
Result	French victory

Belligerents
Navarrese garrison	Kingdom of France

Commanders and leaders
	John II of France

Casualties and losses
Unknown	Unknown
- Location within Normandy

The siege of Breteuil was the investment (surrounding) of the Norman town of Breteuil, held by partisans of King Charles II of Navarre, by French forces between April and about 20 August 1356. It was interrupted on 5 July when a small English army commanded by Henry, Earl of Lancaster, relieved and resupplied the town. The French king, John II, attempted to bring Lancaster to battle with the much larger French royal army, but Lancaster avoided this. John then renewed the siege of Breteuil.

The French force attracted praise for its splendour and the high status of many of its participants, but it made little progress as the town was well-garrisoned and had been left by Lancaster with food for a year. John attempted to mine under the walls, to no avail. Meanwhile, Edward the Black Prince, the son and heir of the English king, assembled an Anglo-Gascon army at Bergerac in south-west France. On 4 August 1356 this joint army marched into French-held territory, devastating the countryside as it went. At some point in August an unusually large mobile siege tower was pushed up to the walls of Breteuil and an assault launched. The defenders set fire to the tower and repulsed the attack, inflicting many casualties. Taking Breteuil became a matter of prestige for John and he refused to take the army south to face the Black Prince.

Eventually, some time around 20 August 1356, John gave the garrison of Breteuil free passage to the Cotentin in north-west Normandy and a huge bribe to persuade them to vacate Breteuil. All available French forces were then concentrated at Chartres to oppose the Black Prince. John and his army pursued the Black Prince's force, cut off their retreat and forced it to battle at Poitiers. The French were defeated with heavy casualties and John was captured.

== Background ==
Since the Norman Conquest of 1066, English monarchs had held titles and lands within France, the possession of which made them vassals of the kings of France. On 24 May 1337, following a series of disagreements between Philip VI of France (r. 1328–1350) and Edward III of England (r. 1327–1377), Philip's Great Council in Paris agreed that the lands held by Edward III in France should be taken into Philip's direct control on the grounds that Edward III was in breach of his obligations as a vassal. This marked the start of the Hundred Years' War, which was to last 116 years.

In 1346 Edward led an army across northern France, defeating the French at the Battle of Crécy and successfully laying siege to the port of Calais. Following further inconclusive military manoeuvres by each side, and given that both sides were financially exhausted, on 28 September 1346, the Truce of Calais, intended to bring a temporary halt to the fighting, was agreed. This strongly favoured the English, confirming them in possession of all of their territorial conquests including the port of Calais, extensive territory in northern and western Brittany, and several important fortifications in both Scotland and Gascony. It was to run for nine months to 7 July 1348, but was extended repeatedly over the years until it was formally set aside in 1355. The truce did not stop ongoing naval clashes between the two countries, nor small-scale fighting in Gascony and the Duchy of Brittany, nor occasional fighting on a larger scale.

A treaty ending the war was negotiated at Guînes and signed on 6 April 1354. The French king, now John II (r. 1350–1364), decided not to ratify it and it did not take effect. The latest extension to the truce was due to expire on 24 June 1354. It was clear that from then both sides would be committed to full-scale war. In April 1355 Edward and his council, with the treasury in an unusually favourable financial position, (Note: The English economy was recovering from the severe outbreak of the Black Death in 1346–1348. This greatly benefited the royal treasury, in particular because of the large increase in wool exports. The previous year had marked a significant change in how the export tax on these was collected, which had more than doubled the yield, to £113,420. For context, when Edward became king in 1327 his entire annual income was approximately £30,000.) decided to launch offensives that year in both northern France and Gascony. John attempted to strongly garrison his northern towns and fortifications against the expected descent by Edward III, at the same time assembling a field army; after allocating garrisons the French field army was inadequate, largely because of lack of money to recruit more men.

== Prelude ==
While French attention was focused on the north, Edward III's eldest son, Edward of Woodstock, later known as the Black Prince, arrived in Bordeaux, the capital of English-held Gascony, in September 1355 with 2,200 English soldiers. During October and November 1355 an Anglo-Gascon force of between 5,000 and 6,000 men marched from Bordeaux 300 miles (480 km) to Narbonne and back to Gascony. Known as the Black Prince's chevauchée, this march devastated a wide swathe of French territory and sacked many French towns. No territory was captured, but enormous economic damage was done to France; the modern historian Clifford Rogers concluded that "the importance of the economic attrition of the chevauchée can hardly be exaggerated." The English component resumed the offensive after Christmas to great effect and more than 50 French-held towns or fortifications in south-west France were captured during the following four months. Several local lords went over to the English, bringing a further 30 fortified places with them.

Money and enthusiasm for the war were running out in France. The historian Jonathan Sumption describes the French national administration as "fall[ing] apart in jealous acrimony and recrimination". Much of the north of France was openly defying John and a contemporary chronicler recorded that "the King of France was severely hated in his own realm". The town of Arras rebelled and killed loyalists. The major nobles of Normandy refused to pay taxes. On 5 April 1356 several of these nobles were dining at the table of Charles, John's eldest son, the dauphin, when John arrived and arrested ten of the most outspoken; four were summarily executed. One of those imprisoned was King Charles II of Navarre, one of the largest landholders in Normandy. (Note: Known as "Charles the Bad", he had repeatedly plotted with the English and in 1354 had murdered the constable of France, one of John's closest advisers, in his bedroom and boasted of it.) The Norman nobles who had not been arrested sent messages to Navarre calling for reinforcements and turned to Edward for assistance.

== First siege ==
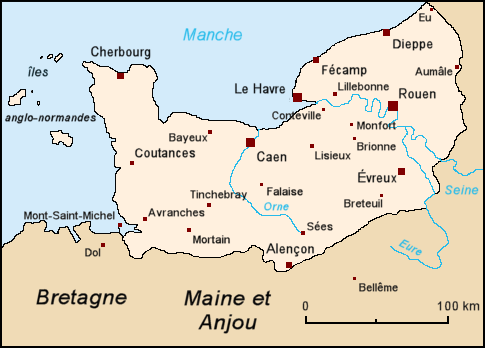
Normandy, with Breteuil shown a little to the right of centre

During April 1356 the French took control of most of Normandy and laid siege to those fortifications which refused to surrender. The Cotentin area in the north-west was pro-Navarrese, but the French concentrated on mopping up Navarrese strongholds in central Normandy. Charles, the dauphin, who was also the duke of Normandy, took charge of suppressing these holdouts. The major Navarrese fortifications he focused on were Pont-Audemer, Breteuil, Tillières-sur-Avre and Évreux. The French king was at Chartres assembling an army with which to move against the Black Prince in Gascony. An arrière-ban, a formal call to arms for all able-bodied males, was announced by the French on 14 May 1356. The response was unenthusiastic and the call was repeated in late May and again in early June.

The king of Navarre was the count of Évreux, and Évreux was the capital of his holdings. This caused Charles to take personal command of its siege; he ordered several assaults, which were unsuccessful. In early June another attack breached the walls and the defenders were forced back to the citadel, leaving the town in flames. A surrender of the citadel was negotiated, in exchange for granting the garrison, which included Navarre's senior councillors, free passage to Breteuil. The town of Pont-Audemer was attacked by a French force commanded by Robert de Houdetot; it is unclear if the town was taken, as with Évreux, but in any event the citadel held out. Houdetot ordered assaults on the citadel, which failed; so he drove mines towards its walls in an attempt to sap them. The third Navarrese-held position in central Normandy was the walled town of Breteuil; it possessed a strong citadel, built some 300 years earlier. The town was prosperous, but as a fortification it was strategically unimportant. It was besieged by a large French force, but no siege works were undertaken against it. While this situation was developing John II felt the need to stand ready to personally intervene in Normandy if needed. He had already entered into commitments that a royal army would succour south-west France, and so he ordered a second army to be raised at Bourges; John's third son, the fifteen-year-old John, Count of Poitiers, was given nominal command. John II remained at Chartres.

Philip of Navarre, a younger brother of Charles of Navarre, took command of several adherents of his brother and withdrew to the northern Cotentin. From there he appealed to the English king for military assistance. Edward decided to back the Navarrese. He had been preparing an expedition to Brittany under Henry, Earl of Lancaster, as part of the War of the Breton Succession; Edward diverted this to Normandy to support the French rebels. On 18 June 1356 Lancaster arrived at St Vaast la Hogue in the north-east Cotentin with 500 men-at-arms (Note: Men-at-arms were, broadly, knights or knights in training. They were drawn from the landed gentry and ranged from great lords to the relatives and attendants of minor landowners. They needed to be able to equip themselves with a full suit of plate armour and a war horse.) and 800 longbowmen. They were reinforced by 200 Normans under Philip of Navarre. The English commander Robert Knolles joined Lancaster in Montebourg with a further 800 men detached from English garrisons in Brittany. The historian Clifford Rogers suggests that these 2,300 men (Note: Lancaster's initial force of 2,300 men was made up of 900 men-at-arms and 1,400 archers, mostly longbowmen.) were reinforced by up to 1,700 men from Navarrese-held fortifications during the following month.

=== Relief ===
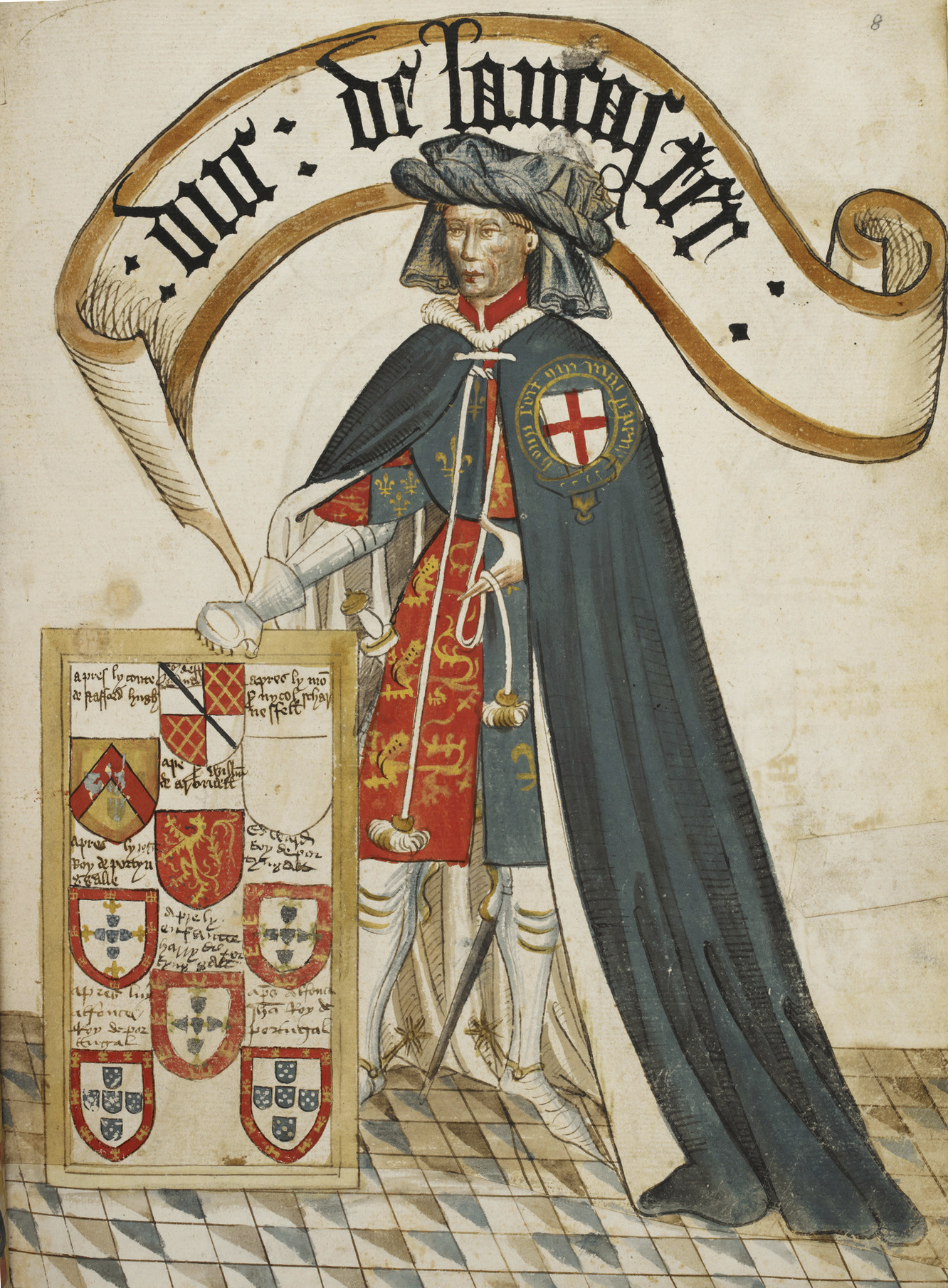
Henry of Lancaster

On 24 June 1356 the English set out from Montebourg, burning and looting their way through western Normandy. Lancaster's small army arrived at Pont-Audemer on the 30th. It is unclear whether the town had already been taken by the French, but the citadel was certainly close to falling, as the French had nearly succeeded in driving their mines under its walls. They fled on hearing of Lancaster's approach, abandoning their baggage and siege equipment. The English spent two days provisioning the town and filling in the French excavations. Detaching 100 men to reinforce the garrison, Lancaster marched south on 2 July, reaching Breteuil on the 5th. Its besiegers retired in good order and it was resupplied by the relieving force sufficiently to stand a siege for a year. With the English marching east, John ordered all available mobile forces to be concentrated at Rouen to head them off. John arrived on 1 July, just before news of Lancaster's force turning south. John was forced to wait in Rouen to allow his now scattered forces to assemble. On 5 July he headed south in haste with his army, on Lancaster's trail.

The English continued their march south on 4 July 1356 to Verneuil, seized it, looted it and took prisoner anyone who it was considered might be worth a ransom. The citadel held out until the 6th, when its defenders negotiated a surrender. (Note: The citadel, known as the Grey Tower (Tour Grise), had been constructed by the English king Henry I (r. 1100–1135).) The attack on Verneuil was probably motivated by the prospect of looting a rich town; no attempt was made to relieve Navarrese-held Tillières-sur-Avre, 7 miles (11 km) to the east. The same day Verneuil's citadel fell, reports of the approach of the French army were being received. It was much stronger than the English force, with perhaps ten times the number of men. It had moved to Condé-sur-Iton and so was 3 miles (5 km) from the freshly provisioned Breteuil and only 7 miles (11 km) from Verneuil. On 7 July Lancaster rested his men and horses, but they did so arrayed in battle order outside Verneuil in case of a French attack.

The French at Condé-sur-Iton also rested, having marched hard to get there in two days from Rouen, and John probably wished to delay briefly to allow more of his stragglers and detachments to join the army before offering battle. On 8 July 1356, the English marched 14 miles (23 km) west to L'Aigle. The French army, which Rogers describes as "vastly superior ... in numbers", halted 2 or 3 miles (3 to 5 km) away. John sent heralds to Lancaster inviting him to commit his force to a formal battle. Lancaster replied ambiguously but John, convinced that Lancaster's main reason for landing in Normandy was to seek a battle, believed an agreement had been reached and camped for the night. (Note: Lancaster having spent the day of the 7th stationary in battle order outside Verneuil probably contributed to John's belief that the English were eager for battle.) The English, however, broke camp during the night and set off on a long march of 28 miles (45 km) to Argentan. By the time the French realised this attempting a pursuit was clearly hopeless, so the French returned to Breteuil and re-established their siege. A force was sent to Tillières-sur-Avre, which promptly capitulated.

== Second siege ==
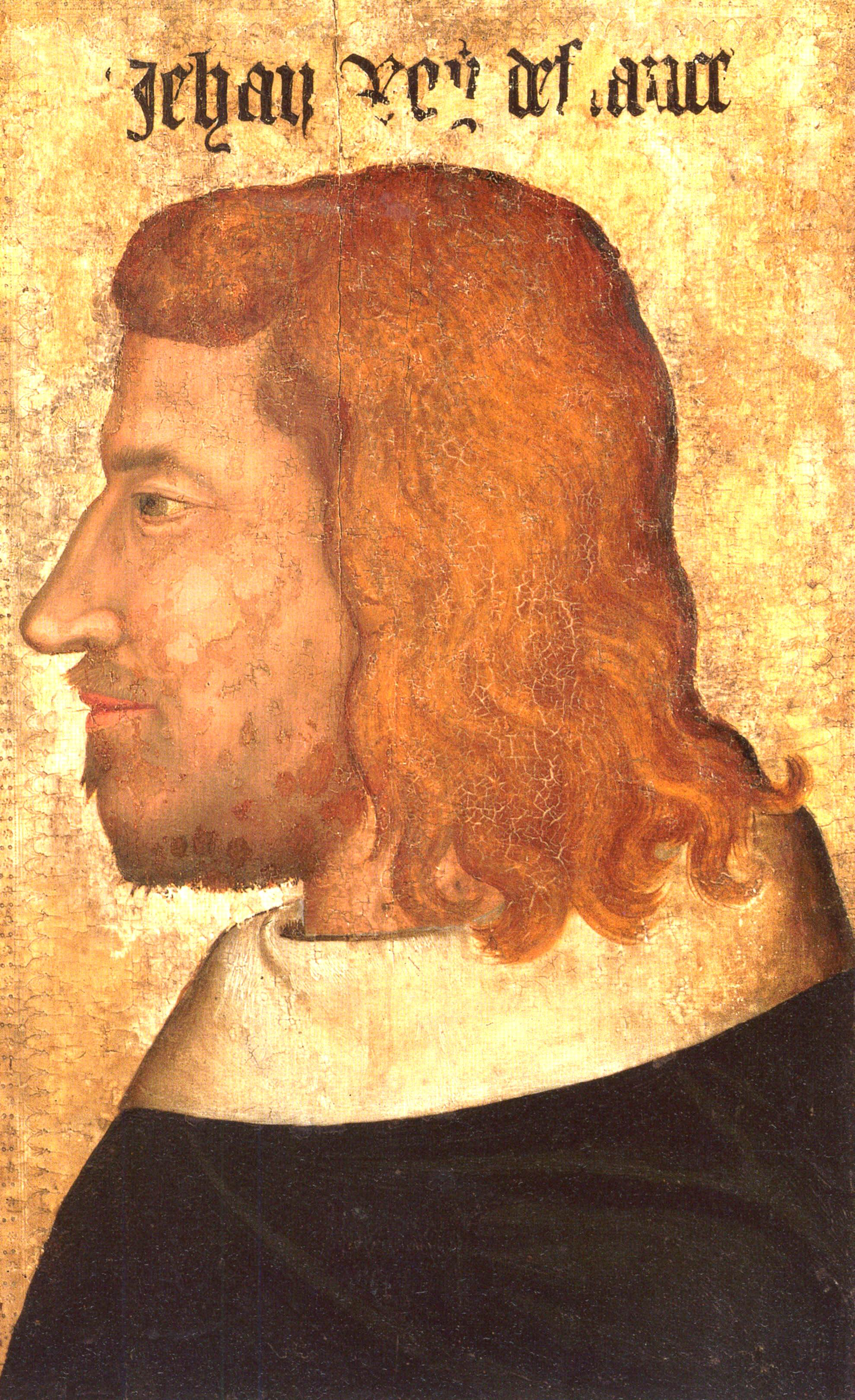
Contemporary image of John II

John took personal charge of this second siege, which commenced on 12 July 1356. The royal army attracted great contemporary praise for its splendour and the high status of many of its participants, but it made little progress, as Breteuil was well garrisoned and had been left by Lancaster with food for a year. Numbers alone could not overcome its strong defences. John attempted to mine under the walls, something which Norman fortifications were frequently susceptible to; on this occasion it was to no avail.

Meanwhile, the Black Prince had assembled an Anglo-Gascon army at Bergerac and on 4 August 1356 it marched north 6,000 strong, devastating the countryside as it went. The French had been concerned regarding a possible offensive by the Black Prince since at least 26 July. At some point in August an unusually large belfry, or mobile siege tower, was pushed up to the walls of Breteuil and an assault launched. The defenders set fire to the belfry and repulsed the attack. Sumption describes the French losses in this attack as "terrible" and the entire second siege as "a pointless endeavour". The modern historian Kenneth Fowler describes the siege as "magnificent but archaic".

Despite it being clear Breteuil could be neither stormed nor starved, John felt unable to abandon the siege as this would undermine his prestige as a warrior-king. He declined to march against the Black Prince, declaring that the garrison of Breteuil posed a more serious threat. Eventually he had to give way to the pressure to do something to prevent the destruction being wreaked in south-west France. Some time around 20 August 1356 he offered the garrison of Breteuil free passage to the Cotentin, a huge bribe and permission to take their valuables and goods, which persuaded them to vacate the town. Large French mobile detachments immediately sent south, towards Tours on the River Loire, to rendezvous with the forces under John of Poitiers. Before long all available forces were being concentrated against the Black Prince.

== Aftermath ==
Philip of Navarre and Godfrey d'Harcourt—a prominent and influential Norman noble—acknowledged Edward III as king of France and paid homage to him for their Norman lands. Lancaster moved on to Brittany with 2,500 men then marched to the Loire, hoping to cross it and reinforce the Black Prince. Because of the unseasonable fullness of the Loire, across which the French had destroyed or strongly fortified all the bridges, Lancaster was unable to effect a junction. In early September 1356 he abandoned the attempt to force a crossing and returned to Brittany. En route he captured and garrisoned many French strongpoints. Once in Brittany he laid siege to its capital, Rennes.

John II assembled the French royal army at Tours and pursued the Anglo-Gascons. He succeeded in cutting off their retreat and forced them to battle at Poitiers on 19 September 1356. The French were heavily defeated by the Black Prince's smaller force and John was captured, along with most of his court and much of the nobility of France. Charles of Navarre, who was imprisoned throughout the siege of Breteuil, was released on 9 November 1357 when a group of his partisans escaladed the castle where he was held, leading to further upheavals in the French government.

== Notes, citations and sources ==
=== Sources ===
- Burne, Alfred (1999) [1955]. The Crecy War. Ware, Hertfordshire: Wordsworth Editions. ISBN 978-1-84022-210-4.
- Curry, Anne (2002). The Hundred Years' War 1337–1453 (PDF). Oxford: Osprey Publishing (published 13 November 2002). ISBN 978-1-84176-269-2. Archived from the original (PDF) on 27 September 2018.
- Fowler, Kenneth (1969). The King's Lieutenant: Henry of Grosmont, First Duke of Lancaster, 1310–1361. New York: Barnes & Noble. ISBN 978-0-236-30812-5. OCLC 164491035.
- Harari, Yuval N. (2007). "For a Sack-full of Gold Écus: Calais 1350". Special Operations in the Age of Chivalry, 1100–1550. Woodbridge, Suffolk: Boydell Press. pp. 109–124. ISBN 978-1-84383-292-8.
- Jaques, Tony (2007). Dictionary of Battles and Sieges. Westport, Connecticut: Greenwood Publishing Group. ISBN 978-0-313-33537-2.
- Madden, Mollie (2018). The Black Prince and the Grande Chevauchée of 1355. Woodbridge, Suffolk: Boydell. ISBN 978-1-78327-356-0.
- Prestwich, Michael (2007). Plantagenet England 1225–1360. Oxford: Oxford University Press. ISBN 978-0-19-922687-0.
- Rogers, Clifford J. (1994). "Edward III and the Dialectics of Strategy, 1327-1360". Transactions of the Royal Historical Society. 4: 83–102. doi:10.2307/3679216. JSTOR 3679216. OCLC 931311378.
- Rogers, Clifford (1998). "An Unknown News Bulletin from the Siege of Tournai in 1340". War in History. 5 (3): 358–366. JSTOR 26007300.
- Rogers, Clifford J. (2004). Bachrach, Bernard S.; DeVries, Kelly & Rogers, Clifford J (eds.). "The Bergerac Campaign (1345) and the Generalship of Henry of Lancaster". Journal of Medieval Military History. Vol. II. Woodbridge, Suffolk: Boydell & Brewer. pp. 89–110. ISBN 978-1-84383-040-5. ISSN 0961-7582.
- Rogers, Clifford J. (2014) [2000]. War Cruel and Sharp: English Strategy under Edward III, 1327–1360. Woodbridge, Suffolk: Boydell Press. ISBN 978-0-85115-804-4.
- Sumption, Jonathan (1990). Trial by Battle. The Hundred Years' War. Vol. I. London: Faber and Faber. ISBN 978-0-571-20095-5.
- Sumption, Jonathan (1999). Trial by Fire. The Hundred Years' War. Vol. II. London: Faber and Faber. ISBN 978-0-571-13896-8.
- Wagner, John A. (2006). Encyclopedia of the Hundred Years War. Woodbridge, Suffolk: Greenwood. ISBN 978-0-313-32736-0.
