= Château de Breteuil =

Château in Yvelines, Île-de-France, France

Coordinates: 48°40′49″N 2°01′23″E

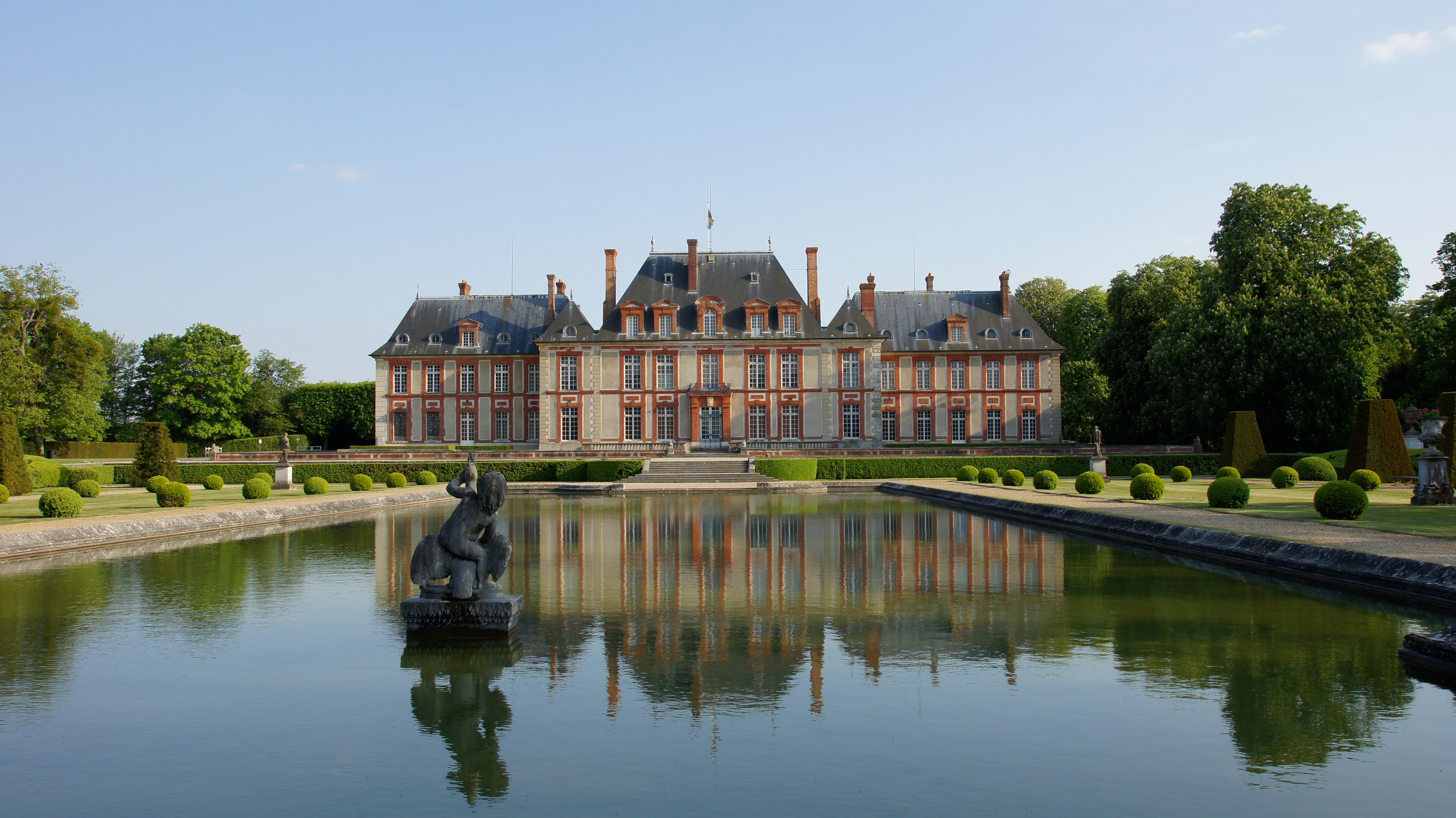
The Château de Breteuil

The Château de Breteuil (previously called the Château de Bevilliers) is a château situated in the Vallée de Chevreuse in Yvelines department of France, 35 km (22 mi) to the southwest of Paris. The château was designated a monument historique in 1973.

The family of the Marquis de Breteuil gave three ministers to the Kings of France. The château is still owned by the Breteuil family.

The design is similar to the Château de Dampierre-en-Yvelines by Jules Hardouin-Mansart.

== Relations with England ==
On March 12, 1881, the Marquis Henri de Breteuil organized a secret meeting at the Château with the Prince of Wales, the future King Edward VII, and Léon Gambetta, President of the Chamber of Deputies. This constituted the beginnings of the Entente Cordiale.

In 1912, another Prince of Wales, the future King Edward VIII (and after his abdication Duke of Windsor), stayed with the Breteuil family for four months to improve his French. Five years later, François de Breteuil played a significant role in the Prince's love life by introducing him to the Parisian courtesan Marguerite Alibert during the Great War.

== See also ==
- Henri Le Tonnelier de Breteuil
- List of Baroque residences
