= Breteuil, Eure =

Breteuil
- Commune
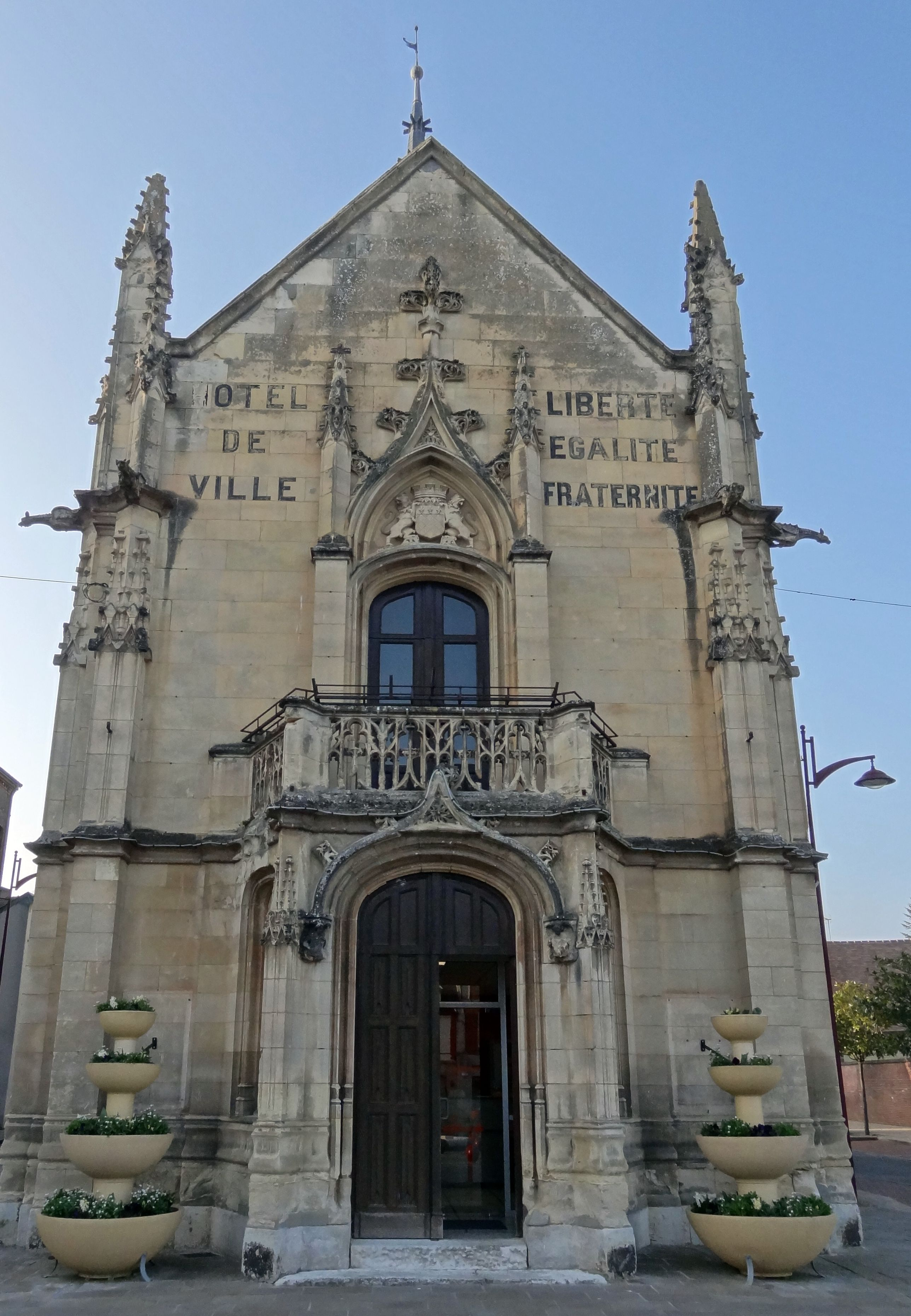
- The town hall in Breteuil

- Coat of arms
- Location of Breteuil
- Location within France Location within Normandy
- Coordinates: 48°50′13″N 0°54′53″E
- Country: France
- Region: Normandy
- Department: Eure
- Arrondissement: Bernay
- Canton: Breteuil
- Intercommunality: Normandie Sud Eure

Government
  - Mayor (2020–2026): Gérard Chéron
- Area^{1}: 55.05 km^{2} (21.25 sq mi)
- Elevation: 179 m (587 ft)
- Highest elevation: 197 m (646 ft)
- Lowest elevation: 157 m (515 ft)
- Population (2023): 4,282
  - Density: 77.78/km^{2} (201.5/sq mi)
- Demonym: Bretoliens
- Time zone: UTC+01:00 (CET)
  - Summer (DST): UTC+02:00 (CEST)
- INSEE/Postal code: 27112 /27160
- ^{1} French Land Register data, which excludes lakes, ponds, glaciers > 1 km^{2} (0.386 sq mi or 247 acres) and river estuaries.

Breteuil (French pronunciation: [bʁətœj]), also known as Breteuil-sur-Iton ("Breteuil-on-Iton"), is a commune in the Eure department in Normandy in northern France. On 1 January 2016, the former communes Cintray and La Guéroulde were merged into Breteuil.

== History ==
During the Middle Ages, Breteuil was the seat of a lordship in the duchy of Normandy. Its lord William FitzOsbern was a companion of William during his conquest of England in 1066. His son William of Breteuil served as a Benedictine abbot before inheriting Breteuil and was later canonized as a saint by the Roman Catholic Church. His illegitimate son Eustace of Breteuil married Juliane de Fontevrault, the illegitimate daughter of King Henry I of England, who feuded with her father and eventually lost control of the lordship.

In 1356, as it had sided with the English, Breteuil was under siege by the king of France, John II (r. 1350–1364). It was relieved in late June after Edward III of England (r. 1327–1377) diverted to Normandy an expedition under Henry of Lancaster, originally planned for Brittany. This strategy aimed at building on discontent and outright rebellion in Normandy against the unpopular French king, and caused John II to retreat to Rouen.

After subsequently failing to bring the English force to battle, the French King returned to Breteuil and re-established the siege. This continued to distract him from the English preparations for a greater chevauchée from south-west France. At some point in August an unusually large belfry, or mobile siege tower, was pushed up to the walls of Breteuil and a full-scale assault launched. The defenders set fire to the belfry and repulsed the attack. The historian Kenneth Fowler describes the siege as "magnificent but archaic".

Eventually John had to give way to the pressure to do something to prevent the destruction being inflicted in south-west France. Sometime around 20 August he offered the garrison of Breteuil free passage, a huge bribe and permission to take with them their valuables and goods, which persuaded them to vacate the town.

== Population ==
Population data refer to the commune in its geography as of January 2025.

Historical population
Year	Pop.	±% p.a.
1968	3,976	—
1975	4,259	+0.99%
1982	4,219	−0.13%
1990	4,280	+0.18%
1999	4,456	+0.45%
2007	4,521	+0.18%
2012	4,553	+0.14%
2017	4,424	−0.57%
Source: INSEE

== See also ==
- Communes of the Eure department
