= Cintray, Eure =

Cintray
- Part of Breteuil
- Location of Cintray
- Location within France Location within Normandy
- Coordinates: 48°47′46″N 0°53′30″E
- Country: France
- Region: Normandy
- Department: Eure
- Arrondissement: Bernay
- Canton: Breteuil
- Commune: Breteuil
- Area^{1}: 16.27 km^{2} (6.28 sq mi)
- Elevation: 176 m (577 ft)
- Highest elevation: 184 m (604 ft)
- Lowest elevation: 165 m (541 ft)
- Population (2023): 419
  - Density: 25.8/km^{2} (66.7/sq mi)
- Time zone: UTC+01:00 (CET)
  - Summer (DST): UTC+02:00 (CEST)
- Postal code: 27160
- ^{1} French Land Register data, which excludes lakes, ponds, glaciers > 1 km^{2} (0.386 sq mi or 247 acres) and river estuaries.

Cintray (French pronunciation: [sɛ̃tʁɛ]) is a former commune in the Eure department in northern France. On 1 January 2016, it was merged into the commune of Breteuil.

== See also ==
- Communes of the Eure department
