= Cintray, Eure-et-Loir =

Cintray
- Commune
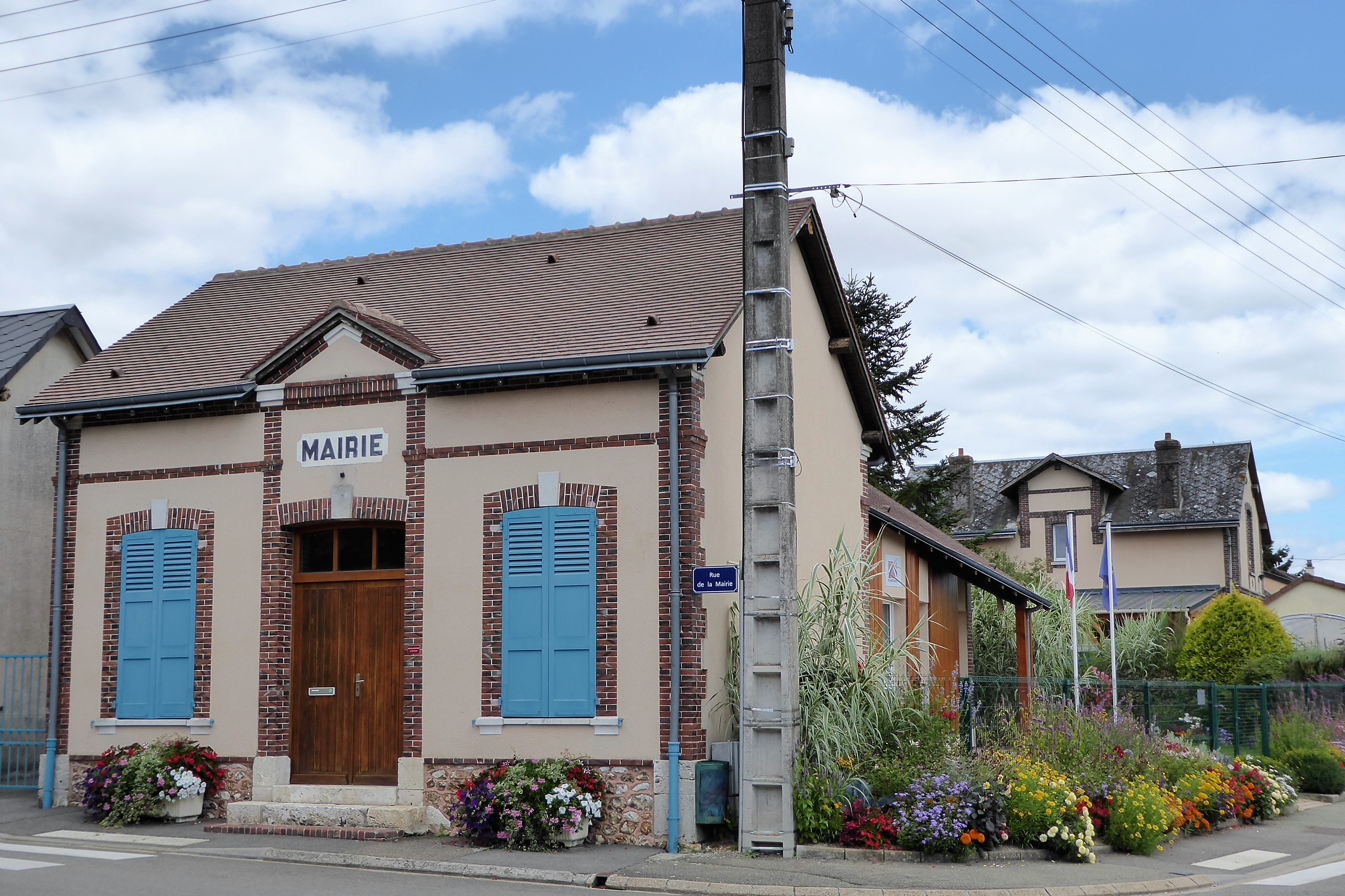
- The town hall in Cintray
- Location of Cintray
- Location within France Location within Centre-Val de Loire
- Coordinates: 48°26′57″N 1°21′59″E
- Country: France
- Region: Centre-Val de Loire
- Department: Eure-et-Loir
- Arrondissement: Chartres
- Canton: Lucé
- Intercommunality: CA Chartres Métropole

Government
  - Mayor (2020–2026): Frédéric Graupner
- Area^{1}: 4 km^{2} (1.5 sq mi)
- Elevation: 157 m (515 ft)
- Highest elevation: 166 m (545 ft)
- Lowest elevation: 148 m (486 ft)
- Population (2023): 479
  - Density: 120/km^{2} (310/sq mi)
- Time zone: UTC+01:00 (CET)
  - Summer (DST): UTC+02:00 (CEST)
- INSEE/Postal code: 28100 /28300
- ^{1} French Land Register data, which excludes lakes, ponds, glaciers > 1 km^{2} (0.386 sq mi or 247 acres) and river estuaries.

Cintray (French pronunciation: [sɛ̃tʁɛ]) is a commune in the Eure-et-Loir department in northern France.

== Population ==
Historical population
Year	Pop.	±% p.a.
1968	101	—
1975	193	+9.69%
1982	230	+2.54%
1990	273	+2.17%
1999	388	+3.98%
2007	442	+1.64%
2012	415	−1.25%
2017	422	+0.34%
2023	479	+2.13%
Source: INSEE

== See also ==
- Communes of the Eure-et-Loir department
