= Henri Le Tonnelier de Breteuil =

French aristocrat and politician

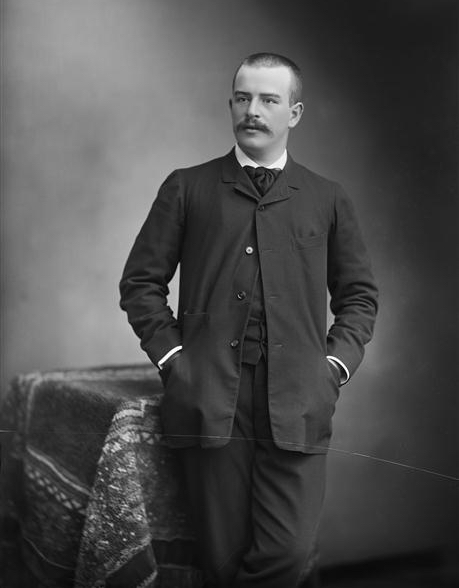
- Breteuil in 1886
- Born: 27 September 1848; Paris, France
- Died: 4 November 1916 (aged 68)
- Occupation: Politician

Henri Le Tonnelier de Breteuil (1848-1916) was a French aristocrat and politician.

== Early life ==
Henri Le Tonnelier de Breteuil was born in 1848. He was the son of Alexandre Le Tonnelier, Marquis de Breteuil (son of Achille Le Tonnelier de Breteuil), and his wife Charlotte-Amélie Fould, daughter of the financier Achille Fould.

== Career ==
Breteuil served as a member of the Chamber of Deputies, representing Hautes-Pyrénées. He was a key negotiator in the Triple Entente.

== Personal life ==
Breteuil resided at the Château de Breteuil. He often invited his friend Marcel Proust, who based the character of Hannibal de Bréauté in In Search of Lost Time on him. Breteuil commissioned architect Ernest Sanson to design his Hôtel de Breteuil in the 16th arrondissement of Paris, completed in 1892.

On 3 March 1891, he married the American heiress Marcelite "Lita" Garner, whose sister Florence Garner married the Scottish socialite Sir William Gordon-Cumming.

== Death ==
Breteuil died in Paris in 1916.
