= Ernest-Paul Sanson =

French architect

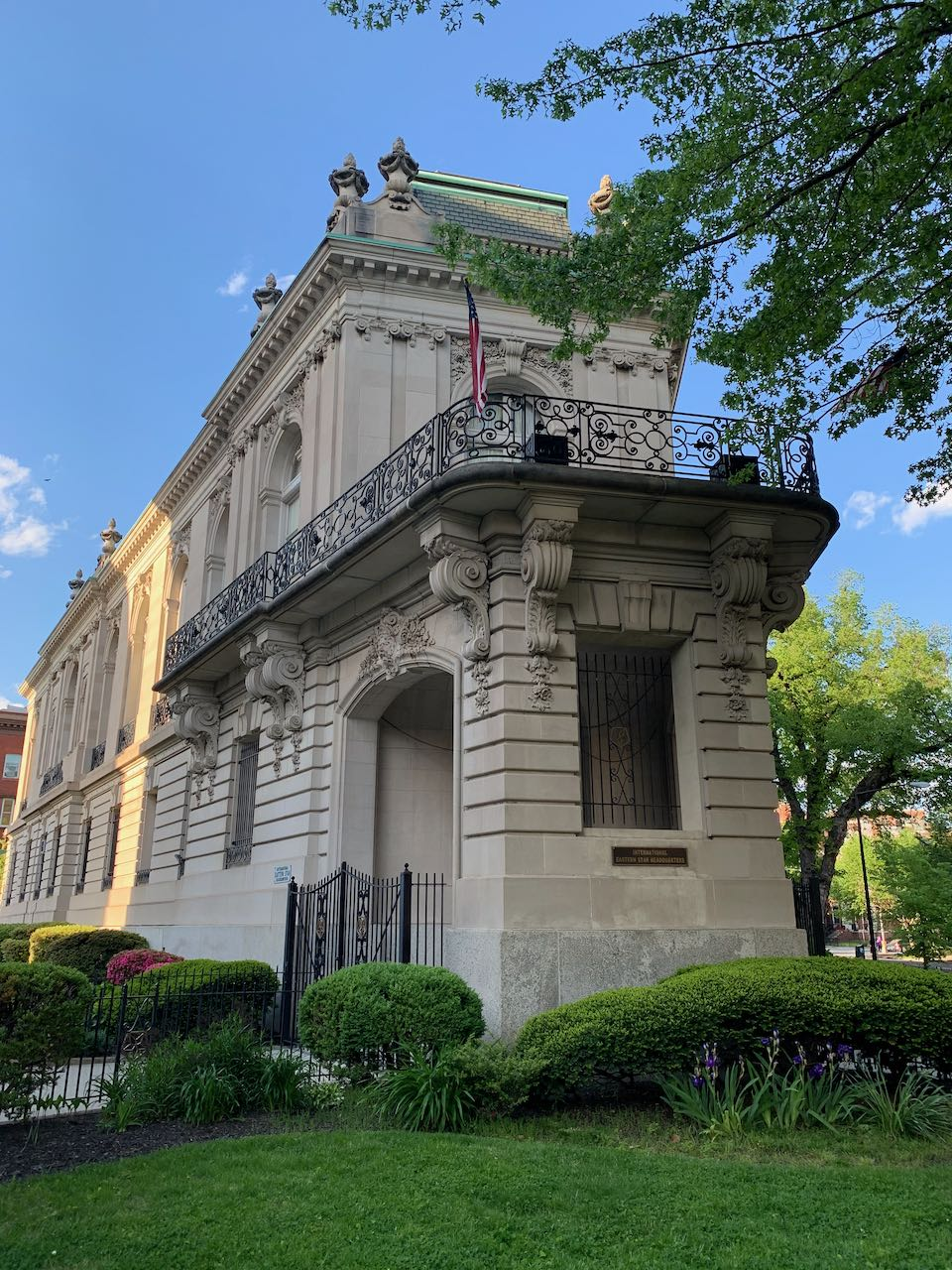
Perry Belmont House (May 2020) showing restoration of the balcony and roof.

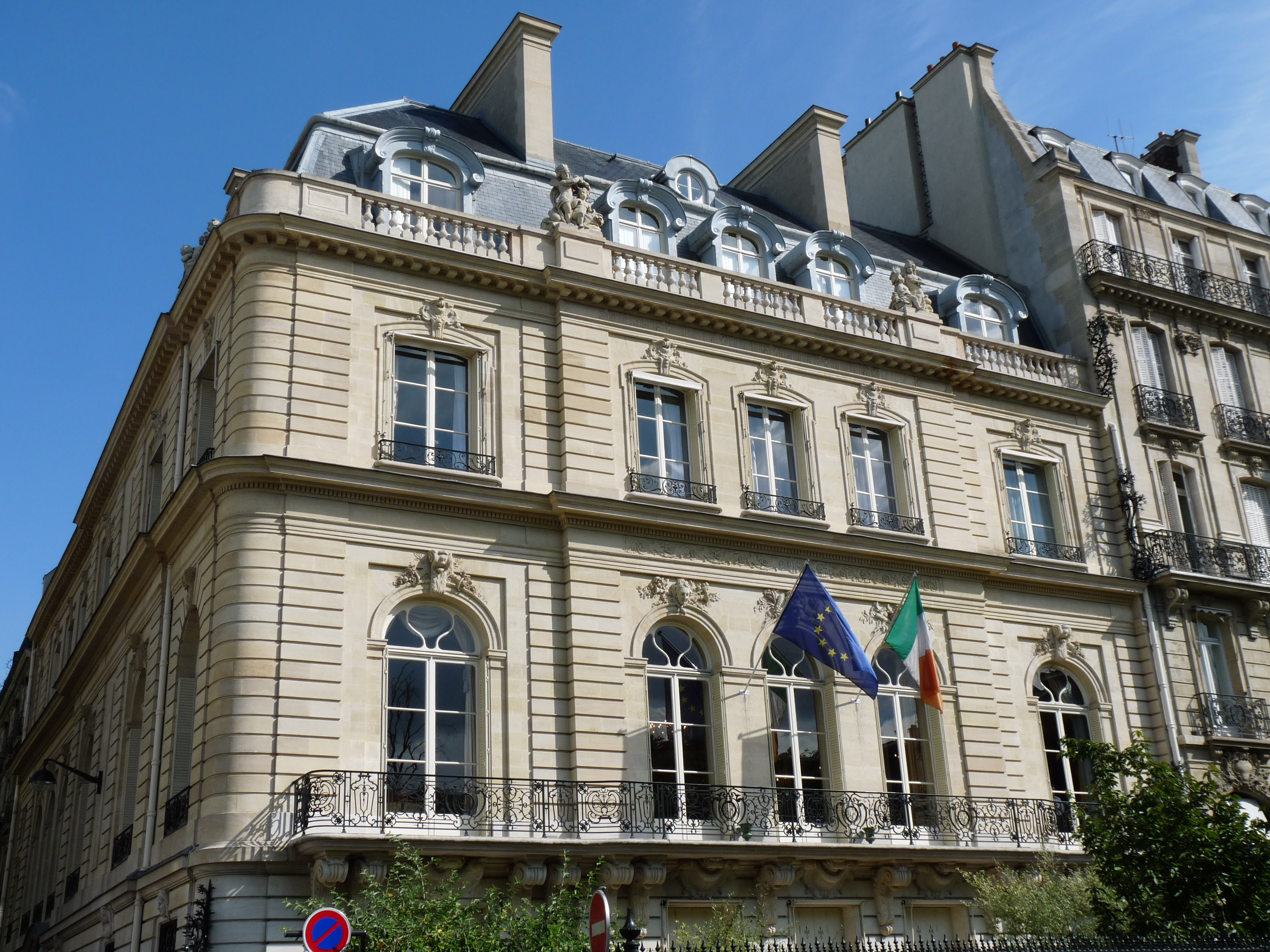
Hôtel de Breteuil, now the Irish Embassy, Paris, 1902

Ernest-Paul Sanson (French pronunciation: [ɛʁnɛst pɔl sɑ̃sɔ̃]; Paris, 12 May 1836 – Paris, 15 January 1918) was a French architect trained in the Beaux-Arts manner.

Sanson entered the École des Beaux-Arts de Paris at the age of eighteen, and followed the courses offered by Émile Gilbert. Having received his diploma in 1861, he was apprenticed first in the office of Denis-Louis Destors and Charles-Auguste Questel and then with Antoine-Nicolas Bailly, who passed his practice to Sanson when he retired in 1865. Sanson quickly made a grand reputation among aristocrats and the rich haute bourgeoisie for his châteaux and grand Parisian town houses, or hôtels particuliers. He took into his practice his son Maurice Pierre (1864–1913), Victor-Guillaume Bariller and René Sergent. The firm's offices were successively at 43, rue de Saint-Pétersbourg, 48, rue d'Anjou and 25, rue de Lubeck, Paris.

Sanson distinguished himself with his tasteful residences in the grand manner, which combined the great architectural tradition of French design of Mansart and Gabriel, with modern amenities of plumbing, heating, and the discreet separation of owners and guests from the supporting staff. He outclassed his rivals in the field by his deft manipulation of classical architectural vocabulary, and the sureness of his taste during an age characterised by architectural excess.

In 1884, Sanson received the grande médaille d'argent for residential architecture bestowed by the Société centrale des architectes; it was followed in 1908, by the Société's grande médaille d'or. In 1911, he was received a chevalier of the Légion d'honneur.

In 1861, Sanson married Marie-Caroline Scelles, with whom he had two sons, Maurice Pierre (1864–1913) and Louis Charles (1866–1917).

== Principal architectural commissions ==
- Anglican chapel Victoria, rue Auguste Vacquerie à Paris (XVIe), in neoclassical style (demolished).
- Château de Menetou-Salon (Cher): in Renaissance style, inspired by the Palais Jacques Coeur, Bourges. For prince and princesse Auguste d'Arenberg, on a site occupied since the Middle Ages (1884–1890)
- Château de Chaumont-sur-Loire (Loir-et-Cher): restorations (1875 or 1885). For the prince de Broglie.
- Château de la Verrerie (Cher): additions (1892): For marquis Louis de Vogüé
- Château des Perrais, Parigné-le-Pôlin (Sarthe): Pavilion and a gallery. For the marquis de Broc.
- Hôpital anglais Hertford, Neuilly-sur-Seine, in Gothic Revival style (1882–1883). For Sir Richard Wallace Currently housing a publicity agency.
- Hôtel d'Arenberg, 20 rue de la Ville l'Évêque, Paris (VIIIe), in Louis XVI style. For prince and princesse Auguste d'Arenberg (demolished in the 1960s).
- Hôtel Bischoffsheim (or Hôtel de Noailles), 11 place des États-Unis, Paris (XVIe), 1895. Currently the Baccarat showrooms.
- Hôtel de Breteuil, 12 avenue Foch, Paris (XVIe), 1902,. For Henry Le Tonnelier de Breteuil. Currently the Irish embassy.
- Hôtel Ephrussi, 2 place des États-Unis, Paris (XVIe), 1886, in Louis XVI taste. For the banker Jules Ephrussi. Currently the Egyptian embassy.
- Hôtel de Ganay, 9 avenue George V, Paris (VIIIe), 1896–1898,. For the marquis and marquise de Ganay. Currently the Assemblée permanente des chambres d'agriculture
- Hôtels Maurice et Rodolphe Kann, 49 et 51 avenue d'Iéna, Paris (XVIe), 1897. The first, largely remodeled, serves as the seat of several societies; the second is the Paris seat of the Gulbenkian Foundation. (le premier, très dénaturé, siège de diverses sociétés, le second Fondation Gulbenkian)
- Hôtel de La Ferronays, cours Albert Ier. Renovations for Eugène II Schneider (ca 1901). Currently the Brazilian embassy.
- Hôtel Kessler, 24–26 avenue Raphaël, Paris (XVIe), 1904
- Hôtel de La Trémoille, 1 boulevard Delessert, Paris (XVIe), 1912
- Hôtel Lebaudy, 55–57 rue François Ier, Paris (VIIIe), 1900. (demolished in 1962).
- Hôtel Porgès, 14–18 avenue Montaigne, Paris (VIIIe), 1892 for Jules Porgès, (demolished).
- Hôtel Schneider, rue d'Anjou, Paris (VIIIe)
- Hôtel de Vogüé, 18 rue de Martignac, Paris (VIIe), 1882–1883 For the comte Arthur de Vogüé. Currently the Commissariat général du plan de Paris
- House at Chantilly (Oise) for the prince de Broglie, in Louis XVI taste, 1905
- Palais Rose (Hôtel Gould-de Castellane), 40 (now 50) avenue Foch, Paris (XVIe), 1895, (demolished 1969).

Outside France Sanson worked in Belgium, New York, Madrid, Washington, Buenos Aires and Córdoba, Argentina.

== Selected works outside France ==
- Carolands, country house at Hillsborough, California. For Francis et Harriett Pullman Carolan (1912–1915). Sanson never visited the site; construction was overseen on-site by the San Francisco architect Willis Polk.
- Château de Belœil, Belgique: Rebuilding after a fire for Louis, prince de Ligne (1900)
- Perry Belmont House, 1618 New Hampshire Avenue, Washington, D.C. (1900)
- Palace for the Duc de Montellano, Madrid
- Leloir Residence, Buenos Aires, Argentina. For Antonio Leloir (1903)
- Palais Ferreyra, Córdoba, Argentina. For Martin Ferreyra (1916)

== See also ==
Place des États-Unis
