= Claim of William Clito =

Sustained Anglo-French rivalry over French royal power

Anglo-French War
- Part of Anglo-French Wars
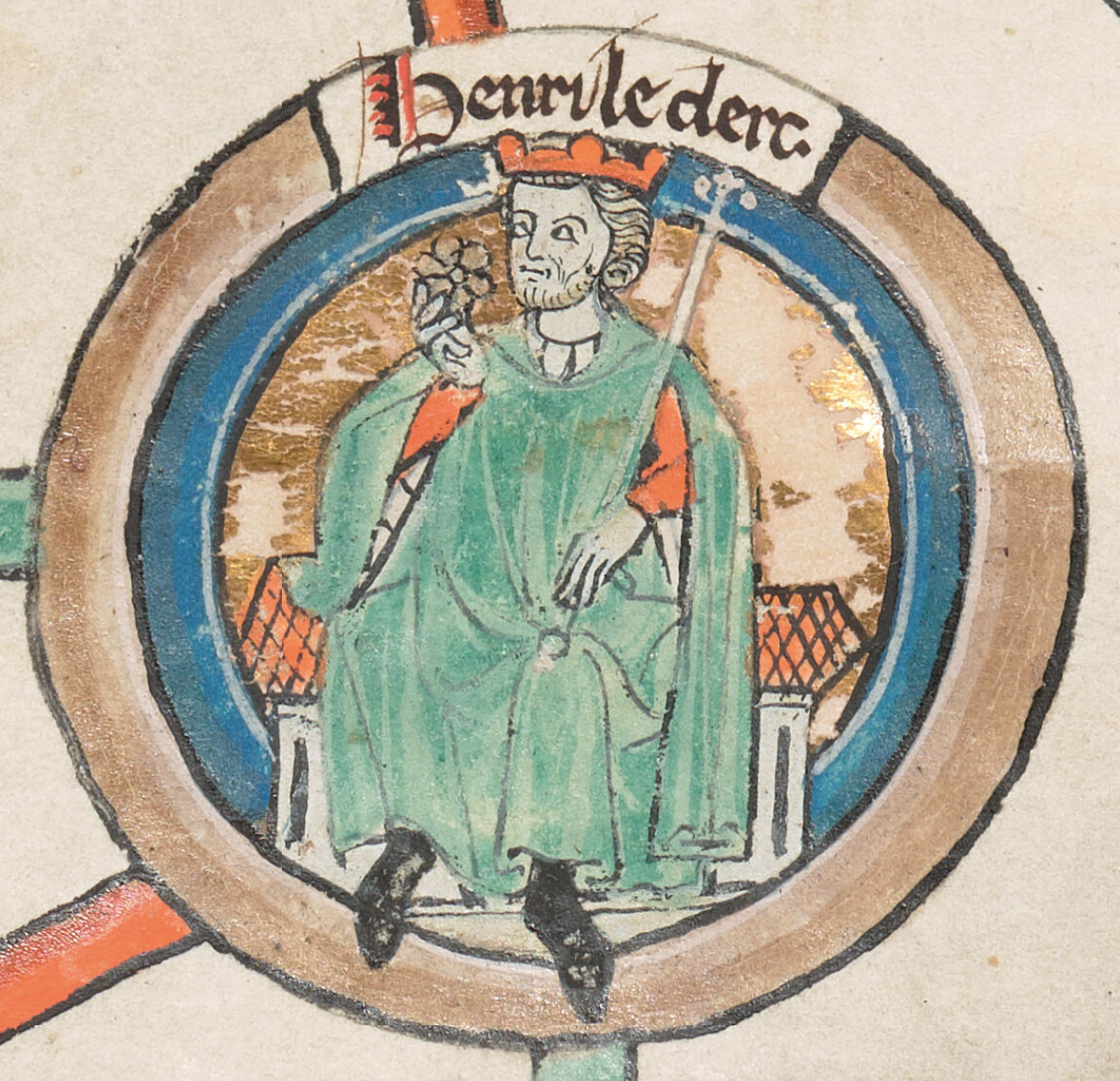
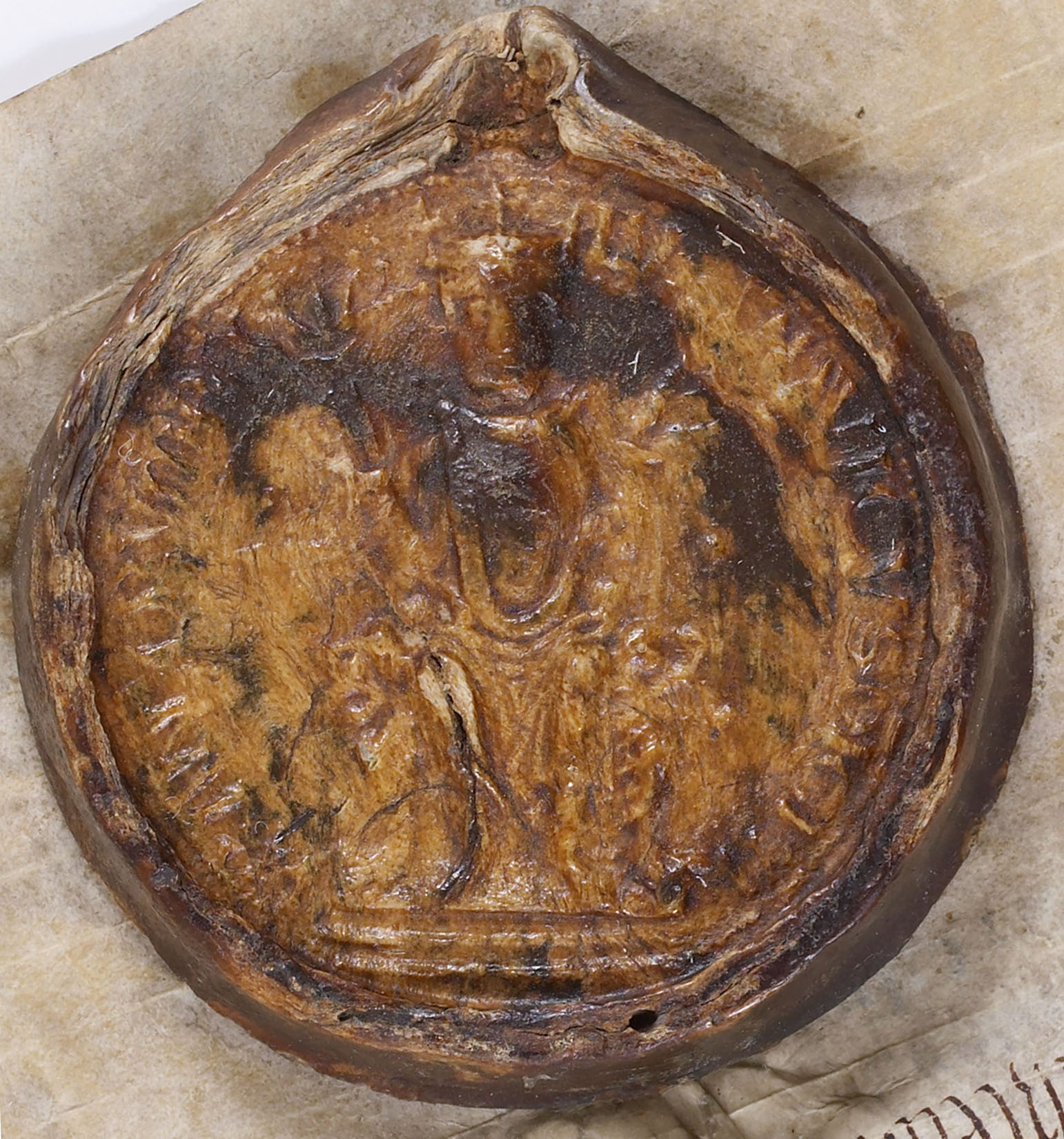
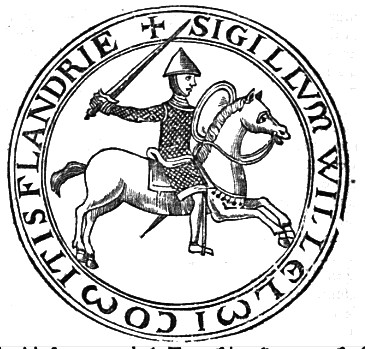
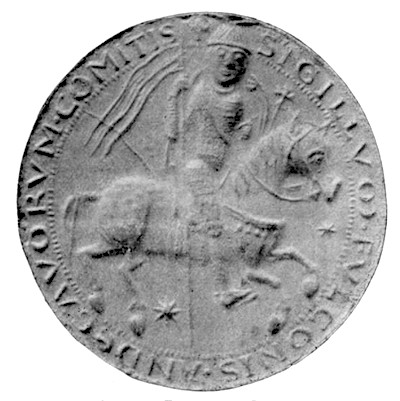
- The four main participants in the conflict, Henry I of England (top-left), Louis VI of France (top-right; royal seal), William Clito (bottom-left; comital seal), Fulk V of Anjou (bottom-left; comital seal)
Date	1108–1129
Location	Northern France
Result	Inconclusive (see Aftermath)

Belligerents
Kingdom of England; Duchy of Normandy	Kingdom of France; County of Flanders (1116–1119, 1127–1128)

Commanders and leaders
Henry I of England; Theobald of Blois (after 1110); Stephen of Blois; Godfrey of Lower Lorraine (1127–1128); Baldwin IV of Hainaut (1127–1128); Thierry of Alsace (1127–1128); Thomas of Marle	Louis VI of France; Ralph I of Vermandois; William Clito; Fulk V of Anjou (1109–1119; 1121–1127); Amaury III of Montfort (1118–1120; 1122–1124); Waleran of Meulan (1122–1124)

Claim of William Clito refers to the conflicts between Louis VI of France and Henry I of England over William Clito's claims to the Duchy of Normandy, the County of Flanders, and potentially to the throne of England. Although Henry did not recognise Clito's claims, Clito attracted support from Henry's dissidents, leading to recurring conflicts in Normandy, Flanders, and the Île-de-France from AD 1108 until his death in 1128.

In 1106, Henry I of England conquered the Duchy of Normandy from his brother Robert Curthose, leaving Robert's son, William Clito, with a claim to the duchy. After ascending the throne, Louis VI began to assert his royal prerogative more forcefully. With regional allies, Louis and Henry first clashed between 1108 and 1113, culminating in Louis's reconciliation with Henry. In 1110, Clito, the son of Robert, escaped capture as Henry attempted to arrest him. A larger conflict broke out between 1116 and 1120 when Louis invaded Normandy alongside Baldwin of Flanders (d. 1119) and Fulk of Anjou, supporting Clito's claim to the duchy over that of Henry's son, William Adelin. Fulk made peace with Henry and wed his daughter Matilda of Anjou to Henry's son, Adelin. Louis and Clito were defeated at the Battle of Brémule in 1119 and the French king made peace with Henry in 1120, with Adelin swearing fealty for Normandy.

Clito's claim to both Normandy and Flanders renewed viability when Adelin, the only legitimate son and heir of Henry, died in the White Ship disaster in November 1120, causing another phase of conflict. Fulk broke with Henry and wed Clito to his daughter Sibylla, but the marriage did not last as Henry convinced the papacy to issue an annulment in 1124. In 1127, Louis raised Clito to the countship after Charles the Good, Count of Flanders, was murdered. Despite early successes, Clito was abandoned by his supporters and threatened by Thierry of Alsace as a rival for the county. He ambushed and defeated Thierry at the Battle of Axspoele, but was mortally wounded while besieging Aalst, where Thierry had retreated, before he could capitalise on his success, dying in July 1128. Henry and Louis signed a peace treaty in 1129, and Thierry was recognised as the Count of Flanders.

The fighting was tied to Louis's campaign to assert the authority of the French king and to his wars against rebellious barons such as Thomas of Marle. This, itself, was the latest step in the attempts of the Capetian kings to assert their authority in France. After Henry's reign, a civil war broke out over the English throne known as The Anarchy. The alliance between Henry and Anjou that came of the fighting formed the nucleus of the Angevin Empire, which threatened Louis's son, Louis VII.

== Background ==
=== Capetian dynasty ===
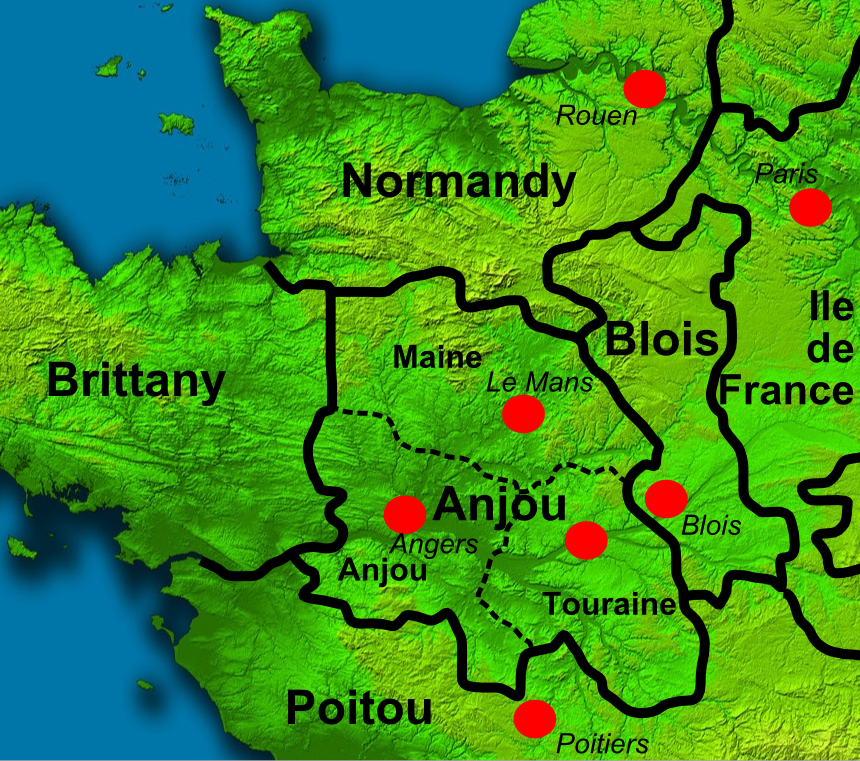
Northern France in the 12th century death; red circles mark major urban centres

The early medieval subjects of West Francia did not regard themselves as a single group beyond their allegiance to one king. There was not even a contemporary name for the entire region; "West Francia" is a later historiographical term. By the late 9th century AD, royal presence no longer penetrated past the comital level, while the power of the comes, count, increased continuously. The ability of the Carolingian crown in West Francia to exercise most of its prerogatives (aside from dispensing charters and receiving fealty) was weakened significantly.

The Robertian dynasty first arose in the 9th century under Robert the Strong in Neustria (Northern France), and its first king was his son Odo. Despite the brevity of his reign (888–898), it undermined the power of the Carolingians by creating an alternative dynasty, and the Carolingian Charles the Simple would be deposed in favour of Robert I, another Robertian. He was succeeded by his son-in-law, Rudolph. In 987, the Robertian Hugh Capet became the King of West Francia, founding the Capetians. Since the reign of Henry I of France, the Capetian kings had gradually gained more recognition and authority from their princes. He oversaw the emergence of a central royal bureaucracy in France. This Henry saw mixed but real success in his dealings with Anjou and Blois. Fighting between the French crown and the dukes of Normandy continued under Louis's father, Philip, stoking revolt, dividing the conqueror's family, and placing pressure on the Vexin.

In the 980s, the Capetian crown held significant estates between Orléans and Paris, but by the second half of the 11th century, they began buying and selling parcels of land to consolidate the royal demesne. The Capetians theoretically had the rights to collect revenues over a much wider area than simply the royal demesne, but in fact this was challenged strongly by castellans of the king who made claims of autonomy. By the mid-century, the French crown partially suppressed these interests. Philip I of France significantly expanded his personal holdings, adding the Vexin, Amiens, and other territories.

=== Relations between Normandy and France ===
Conflicts between the French crown and the dukes of Normandy arose first in the mid-11th century, with Henry of France launching unsuccessful invasions of Normandy under William the Conqueror throughout the 1050s. After Henry, Philip received multiple opportunities to intervene in the duchy, and gained a decisive upper hand after the conqueror's death in 1089, when Normandy entered into a period of instability under the rule of Duke Robert Curthose. From 1103 onwards Robert's vassals gradually peeled off from him in favor of his younger brother Henry, who ruled as King of England. (Note: These included Eustace of Breteuil, Bishop Serlo of Séez, Rotrou of Perche, and others.) The Anglo-Norman king's preparations for an invasion of Normandy were ongoing from 1104, prompted by Robert's reconciliation with the rogue baron, Robert of Bellême. Henry invaded Normandy in 1105 and 1106, culminating in the decisive Battle of Tinchebray, where the duke was captured. At Falaise, Henry met the duke's 4-year-old son, William Clito. As a show of compassion, he placed the boy into the care of his brother-in-law, Helias of Arques. (Note: Helias had been a long-time ally of Duke Robert, having been wed to a natural daughter of his and being given Arques-la-Bataille as a benefice. He would become an equally loyal follower of William.) Henry's intervention in Normandy revived ducal authority under him.

In the aftermath, Henry temporarily made peace with Robert of Bellême to avert further conflict and consolidated his regime in Normandy. The king released many of his prisoners, aside from Count William of Mortain and Duke Robert. He also dealt with the issue of the Investiture Controversy in England, reconciling with the church and Archbishop Anselm of Canterbury in 1107. In 1108, Louis VI, known as the fighter or the fat, succeeded Philip as King of France. Philip and Henry had maintained a cordial relationship up to this point, but Louis intended to expand the power of the French crown. (Note: At the time, France was a collection of largely independent counties and duchies under the theoretical authority of the king, whose real power was tied to his control of the Île-de-France.) It was under the reign of Louis VI, who Jim Bradbury referred to as an "active military man," that a surge of royal power would take place. In particular, Louis desired the castle of Gisors, its status in doubt.

== Direct confrontation ==
=== Revolt in France ===
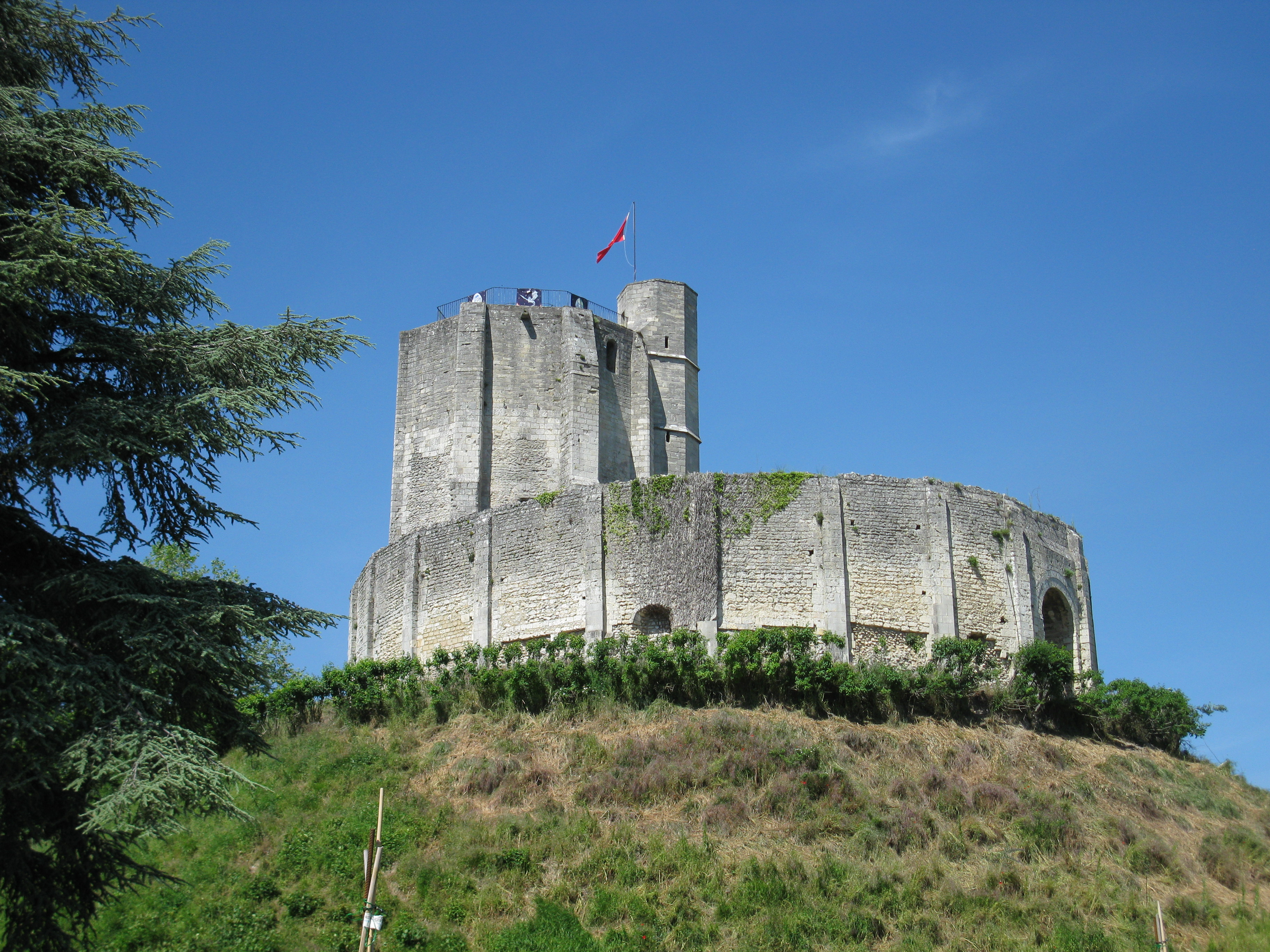
The Castle of Gisors, a major point of contention

Upon his accession, Louis demanded Henry's homage for Normandy (alongside the other French princes) and that Henry surrender the fortifications of Bray-et-Lu and Gisors, which French sources alleged were held in violation of a prior agreement. The truth of this statement, which Henry denied, cannot be ascertained. Louis raided into Normandy, but when he and Henry encountered each other on opposite sides of the Epte, they agreed to a truce that resolved none of their disputes. Supporters of Louis in the Vexin overthrew William of La Roche-Guyon soon after the meeting on the Epte. Henry suffered another diplomatic reversal when Fulk V became the Count of Anjou in 1109. This directly led to Henry losing his suzerainty over Maine; Helias of Maine, Henry's fidelis, died in 1110, and Fulk inherited his county, refusing to renew the arrangement. Instead, the new count allied himself with Louis. Meanwhile, Henry attempted to arrest Clito in 1110 while he was eliminating a number of unruly barons, but Clito escaped capture with his guardian Helias of Arques. Henry then arrested Robert of Bellême in 1112, which eliminated one of Clitos's supporters.

Henry had Stephen of Blois as an ally, who was his younger nephew through his sister Adela's marriage with Stephen-Henry of Blois. Adela's other son, Theobald II of Blois, would break from Louis and ally with Henry by 1110. Louis meanwhile dealt with rebellious barons and castellans in around the Île-de-France such as Hugh de Puiset, who represented the most significant threat to royal authority. In 1111, Louis besieged and capturing the castle of Le Puiset and Hugh with it. When released under oath in 1112, Hugh immediately took up arms against the king again, defeating Louis near Le Puiset. Hugh would not be defeated for another 6 years. By 1112, Louis faced one of the most significant crises of his reign when Hugh and Theobald of Blois led a significant coalition of French lords in an uprising against Louis, defeating the king in battle near Le Puiset. Ralph of Vermandois was one of the French king's supporters, while the rebels were backed by Henry I, whom Suger reports sent a Norman army.

Marriage pacts won Henry more allies at this time. A betrothal between the king's son William Adelin and Fulk's daughter Matilda brought Anjou into back into the Anglo-Norman orbit, and a marriage between Henry's natural daughter Matilda FitzRoy and Conan III of Brittany, dated by modern historian Hollister to just before 1113 was made with the same intent. Henry was left with the upper hand. Although Louis's position did not collapse, and he defeated many of the rebel castellans, he was forced to come to terms. Louis acquiesced to Henry all that had been contested, as well as the overlordship of Maine and Brittany, which he had already gained.

=== Armed Interlude ===
William Clito had resided in Flanders after 1112, and Hollister suggests that he developed a bond with Baldwin VII, the Count of Flanders. Baldwin launched raids into Normandy as early as 1114, but he did not present a serious military threat to the English king and Henry seemed confident the truce would hold. In 1115, Henry attempted to convince Louis to accept William Adelin's fealty for the Duchy of Normandy, as a solution to the unique situation in Normandy. However, on the advice of William II of Nevers, Louis refused, instead choosing to support the claim of William Clito. Theobald soon seized William of Nevers and would hold him for the next few years. The next round of fighting likely broke out around 1116, influenced by Henry's earlier support for the French rebels. The campaigns (mid-1116 to mid-1118) led by Louis of France and Baldwin of Flanders caused devastation in northeastern Normandy within the pays of Caux.

=== Invasion of Normandy ===
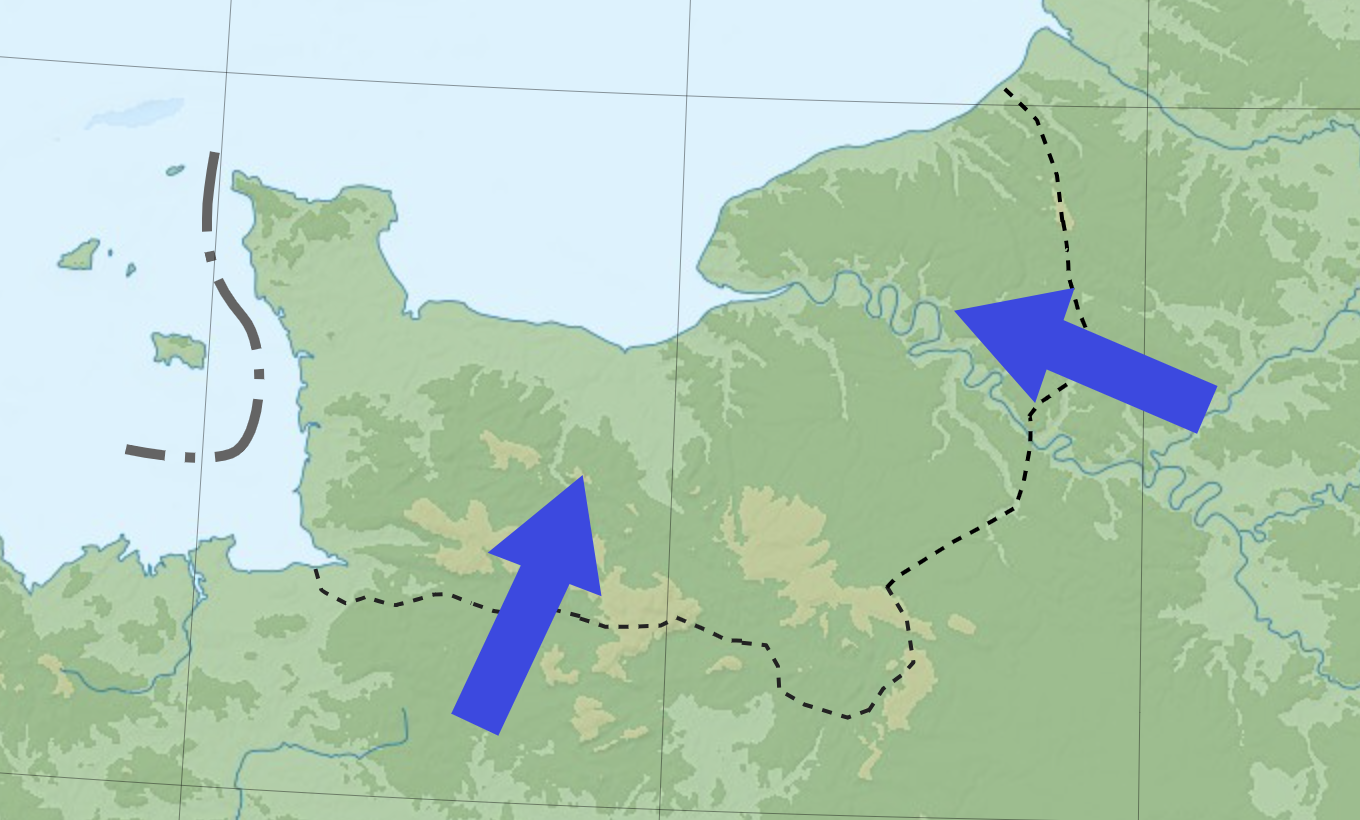
A simplistic map of the French and Angevin invasions of Normandy from 1116 to 1120. The southwest arrow is the attack of Fulk of Anjou, and the northeast arrow is the attack of Louis of France.

The war began in earnest after 1118 with the deaths of Henry's key advisors, Robert of Beaumont, William of Évreux, and his queen Matilda of Scotland. Peace in Normandy collapsed under invasions from Fulk, Louis, and Baldwin, and according to Orderic Vitalis, 18 castellans in upper Normandy fought for Clito. As a preventative measure, Hugh of Gournay and Henry, Count of Eu, two magnates in the northeast, were both arrested by the king on suspicion of defection in 1117. They were both released at the insistence of William of Warenne, but despite promises of good conduct, they took up arms against the king in June 1118. Stephen of Aumale, who, alongside Henry of Eu, had ties to Baldwin of Flanders, also revolted in favour of Baldwin. Further south. Robert Giroie, another rebel baron, held the castle of Saint-Céneri against the king, joining Fulk of Anjou in a siege of La-Motte-Gautier. The garrison surrendered by August.

On 3 September, Louis managed to seize L'Aigle, but his success was counterbalanced when Baldwin of Flanders suffered a wound that same month, forcing him to return to Flanders, where he would die on 17 June 1119. His successor, Charles the Good, made peace with Henry. This loss for Louis and Clito was soon offset on 7 October when William Pointel, the royal constable of Évreux, surrendered the castle of Évreux to Amaury III of Montfort, a Norman rebel who was allied with Louis and Fulk of Anjou. Stephen of Blois was granted the town of Alençon in order to help with Henry's defence in Southern Normandy, but he mistreated the townspeople. In response, they sought aid from Fulk of Anjou in their revolt. Alongside his brother Theobald, Stephen led the advance guard, but they were defeated in battle before the walls, and Alençon's garrison surrendered before the end of 1118.

Fighting continued into 1119 as Louis launched a campaign towards Les Andelys and captured the town in the early year, holding it for the next few months. From his bases at L'Aigle and Les Andelys, Louis was able to send in raiding parties into the Vexin, and by now the French, Angevin, and rebel Norman coalition controlled a significant amount of territory near the borders of the duchy. In addition, Henry's life was threatened twice, and he became nervous over his personal security. Around the same time, Eustace of Breteuil threatened to make war against the king unless his family's castle of Ivry was returned to him. Henry promised to consider his request, holding Ralph Harenc's son as a hostage while giving Ralph Eustace's daughters. On the advice of Amaury of Montfort, Eustace blinded Ralph's son. As recompense, Henry allowed Ralph to blind Eustace's daughters. Eustace led a revolt against Henry, but it was largely unsuccessful; when his wife, Juliana, attempted to defend their castle at Breteuil, the garrison was undermanned and demoralised, forcing her to flee. The couple lost almost all of their lands.

=== Norman recovery ===
Fulk of Anjou exited the conflict in May 1119 when Henry, partially prompted by his defeat at Alençon, finally agreed to pay him a large sum of money, and upon the completion of the long-awaited marriage between William Adelin and Matilda of Anjou. Also at Fulk's request, Henry restored the lands of the Bellême family to Robert's son and heir, William Talvas. The count of Anjou then went on crusade to Jerusalem, leaving Maine to Henry I until his return. This infuriated the French court. Henry had a major advantage in his large and professional familia regis, which was a permanent, salaried core of royal troops distinct from the temporary mercenaries he also employed.

By August 1119, Louis and Henry were both campaigning in the Vexin around Noyon-sur-Andelle, but neither army was aware of the other's presence. Henry posted scouts who warned him of the enemy's approach. Louis and Henry had 400 and 500 knights respectively, however in Louis's entourage was William Clito, who rode with him as a young knight. With William Crespin as the king's lieutenant, the French charged in two squadrons. Despite managing to strike a blow to Henry's head, they were unable to break through and were surrounded by the English. The French suffered only 3 deaths, but lost over a fourth of their army to capture. A failed counterattack towards Breteuil was launched before Louis gave up. Afterwards, the war largely petered out.

When the Council of Rheims was assembled on 18 October 1119, Louis found an opportunity to appeal. He made a series of complaints, including over Henry I's invasion of Normandy in 1105–1106, as it was a part of his kingdom, over Henry's treatment of Robert Curthose, his vassal, over his disinheritance of William Clito, who was with the French king, and other issues. The papacy urged peace and commanded the two sides to observe the Truce of God. Near Aumale, Henry negotiated with William Clito, who pleaded for his father's release in exchange for going together to Jerusalem and never returning. Henry instead offered Clito wealth and three counties in England. Out of respect for his father, Clito angrily rejected the offer. Louis and Henry made peace in mid-1120, with William Adelin performing fealty for Normandy.

== Indirect competition ==
=== The White Ship ===
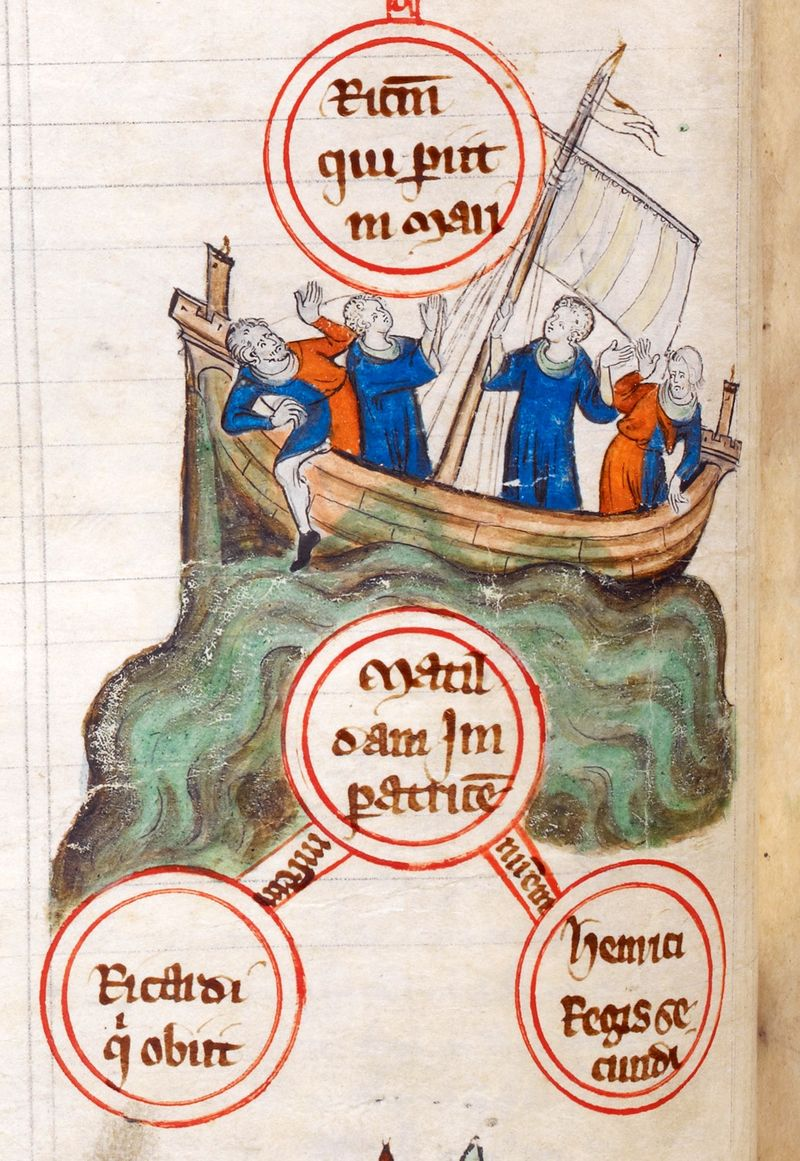
Early 14th-century depiction of the sinking of the White Ship at Barfleur on 25 November 1120

Henry sailed for England from the port of Barfleur on 25 November 1120, and allowed many of the younger members of the Anglo-Norman nobility sailed on the White Ship, which was owned by Thomas FitzStephen. This included the king's son, William Adelin, his natural daughter Matilda of Perche, and his natural son Richard, now lord of Breteuil. A notable absence was Stephen of Blois, even though he was a servant directly to the king and was generally with him, he stayed in Normandy, possibly out of concern over safety, or due to diarrhea. As the rowers steered ahead, they crashed against a rock, and the ship capsized, causing a great loss of life, including Henry's children. Upon hearing this, the English king was desolate.

The crash revived Louis's hopes and raised Clito up as a viable claimant to England and Normandy once again. In the view of historian J. F. Andrews, "as the only son of the conqueror's eldest son, his claim would surely override that of anyone else; he was 18, popular, and a veteran of a number of military campaigns." Clito was increasingly recognised as a charming, militarily capable, and charismatic young man. In fact, for Henry to recognise Clito as heir would probably please many of his subjects. To Henry, this could have cast doubt on his own right to rule in the first place by legitimising Clito's dynastic superiority. In addition, Henry may have been personally unwilling to promote his nephew. He may have considered his nephews of the Blois clan, Stephen and Theobald, for the crown, but by 1126 it was clear that he was set on his daughter Empress Matilda, who in 1120 was married to Henry V of Germany. Clito now drew supporters from across the Anglo-Norman realm. (Note: This probably included Roger, Bishop of Salisbury, who was Henry's most powerful counsellor, Pain fitzJohn, and others.)

Fulk of Anjou's alliance with Henry, predicated on the marriage of his and Henry's children, began to collapse. After arriving from the holy land in 1121, he demanded the return of his daughter's dowry, but was refused, and thus allied with Amaury of Montfort. In 1124, Fulk would marry his other daughter, Sibylla of Anjou, to Clito, granting him the County of Maine as a dowry until Clito's supposed conquest of Normandy. Henry convinced the papacy to support him in annulling Clito's marriage, but Fulk had to be threatened with excommunication in order to give in, driving Clito out of Maine. (Note: The marriage between Clito and Sibylla lay within a prohibited degree of consanguinity, which was a valid reason for annulment in the 12th century. Although the church usually tolerated such marriages, one of which was the marriage between William Adelin and Matilda of Anjou, unless a figure like Henry could object.)

Amaury of Montfort was planning a revolt in Normandy as early as 1122 alongside much of the Norman nobility, including Waleran, Count of Meulan, intending to install Clito as count. The English king's intelligence network had detected this, however, and he set about going on the offensive, in contrast to 1118. After the capture of Pont-Audemer in December 1123, which suffered a siege of nearly two months, fighting cooled for some time, with only a few skirmishes on both sides with mixed success. However, in the Spring of 1124, a large rebel force moved secretly to relieve the castle of Vatteville. They were met and defeated at the Battle of Rougemontier by Odo Borleng, a member of the king's familia. Most rebel leaders were captured. The last resistance was mopped up in the following weeks.

Once it became clear that King Henry would not name Clito as his heir, Louis reacted by gathering his nobles and extracting their promises of support to Clito and granting him castles in the Vexin, even marrying Clito to his own half-sister-in-law. With an army, Clito marched up to Gisors, where he laid claim to Normandy. Louis spent the 1120s asserting royal initiative over the French principalities. By 1130, he would finally crush Thomas of Marle, and the baron died soon after.

Louis himself had made efforts to support the Norman rebellion, and when Henry besieged Pont-Audemer there were French knights amongst the rebel garrison. Louis was distracted by an invasion led by Henry's son-in-law, Henry of Germany, who had been persuaded to attack France by the English king. Louis raised a kingdom-wide coalition army with troops from as far as Aquitaine, though mostly from Northern France, which intimidated Henry V to the extent that he retreated without an engagement. It was a significant triumph and a display of the wide-reaching influence of the king, but Louis did not recover an advantage in Normandy.

=== Crisis in Flanders ===
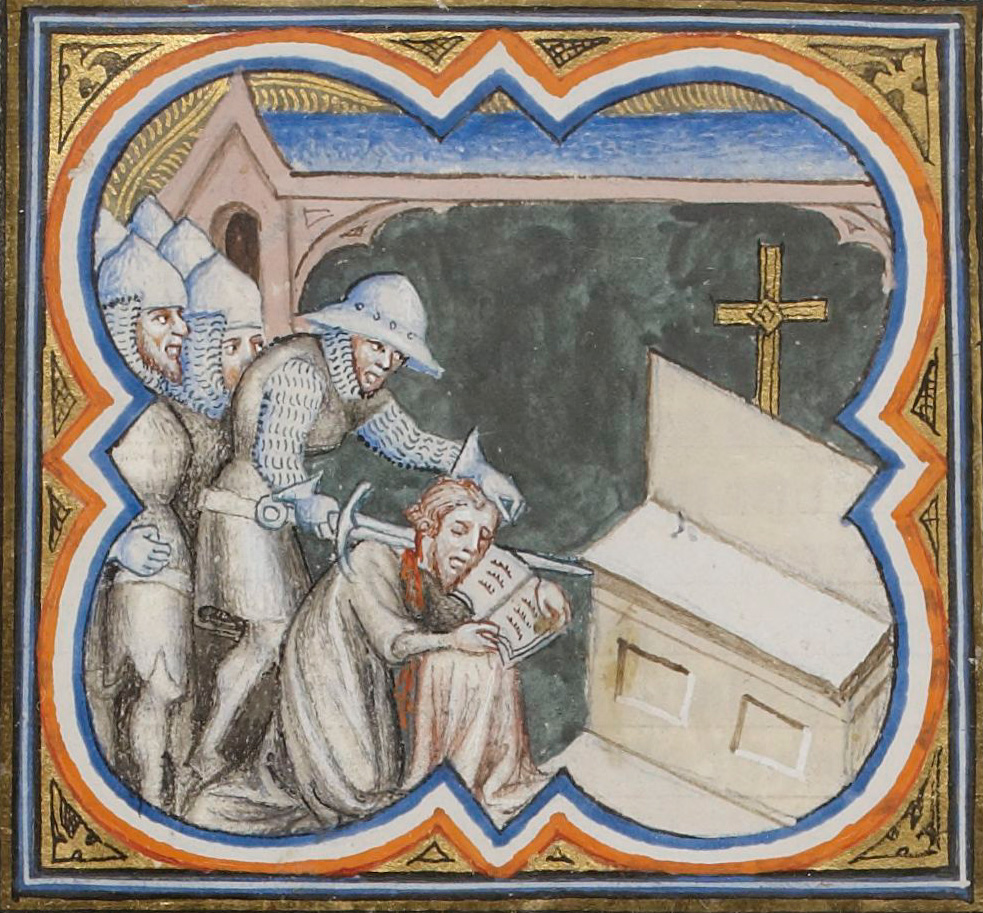
The murder of Charles the Good, from the Grandes Chroniques de France

At the beginning of March 1127, fighting broke out in Flanders upon the murder of Charles the Good, its count after 1119. Exercising his royal prerogative, Louis quickly raised Clito to the countship on 23 March. Clito's own claim was through his great-grandfather, Baldwin V, who fathered the wife of William the Conqueror, Matilda of Flanders. But chiefly, it lay in the support of the French king. Louis campaigned alongside Clito, and by April 23 they had captured Ypres, including William of Ypres who was a rival claimant to the County of Flanders. By May, Louis and Clito had secured Flanders, and an inquest was ordered into Charles's murder, leading to multiple executions of the conspirators.

Henry immediately began attempting to destabilise Clito's hold on the county, distributing bribes and assembling a coalition against the young count. This included his father-in-law, Godfrey of Lower Lorraine, Baldwin of Hainault, William of Ypres, and Thomas of Marle. Stephen of Blois, now Count of Boulogne through his marriage to Matilda of Boulogne, played a key role in this arrangement. He acted as Henry's intermediary, channeling funds to royal allies, and led a summer 1127 invasion of the county from Boulogne. The invasion failed due to Clito's counterattacks, forcing Stephen into a three-year truce. In fact, Clito's establishment as Count of Flanders seems to have even motivated Henry's decision to marry the widowed Empress Matilda (Henry of Germany died in 1125) to Geoffrey Plantagenet, the son of Fulk of Anjou.

The count's situation began to decline by September 1127 as the cities of Bruges, Ghent, Saint Omer, Ypres, and Lille turned away from the count. Henry's efforts to weaken Clito's rule had coupled with the count's lack of understanding of his subjects; he was unused to the Flemish political system, despite having stayed at the court of Baldwin VII between 1112 and 1118 as a child. In contravention of his charters, Clito laid exactions on the Flemish towns. Claimants arose in Arnold of Denmark, though he was defeated by Clito, and Thierry of Alsace, who by May 1128 became Clito's most significant rival. Louis attempted to relieve Clito's position, but when Henry I threatened the Île-de-France, the French king was forced to retreat to defend his own lands.

In the months after March of 1128, when he signed his truce with Stephen, Clito launched a counterattack that placed Thierry on the defensive, and saw Thierry's position decline rapidly. By June, the coalition against him, arranged by Henry, was suffering from infighting over control of Thierry. On 18 and 19 June, Thierry gathered a large army to besiege Axspoele, held by a supporter of Clito named Fulk. He was supported by the city of Bruges, and may have had about 1,300 men, including 300 knights. By contrast, Clito may have had about 450 knights. Taking a position on the hill, he split his force into thirds, leaving one in reserve. When the Flemish knights charged, Clito led them into an ambush by ordering a retreat, and then charging with his fresh reserves once Thierry's troops were exposed.

Clito then besieged Thierry at Oostkamp but was unable to capture the fortification quickly. Thierry retreated to the more fortified Aalst, where Godfrey and Clito besieged him. The siege lasted for 10 days, but Clito was mortally wounded by a Flemish foot soldier and died on 28 July. Clito had sent a letter asking his uncle to forgive his followers on his deathbed, to which Henry agreed. Louis was forced to accept the countship of Thierry. Despite the king's lack of permanent success, Bradbury still considered the affair a positive display of Louis's ambitions.

== Aftermath ==
Clito had been the last significant alternative to Henry's succession plans; his death brought the end of major fighting between Henry and Louis, and the two agreed to a final peace treaty in 1129. Henry's daughter Matilda and her husband Geoffrey, now the Count of Anjou, bore two grandchildren in 1133 and 1134 (including the future Henry II of England), which strengthened Henry's dynastic position further. His relationship with his son-in-law began to decline by 1135, triggered by Geoffrey demanding the frontier castles of Matilda's dowry, to which Henry refused. A revolt broke out in Southern Normandy, which was supported by Geoffrey, and as Henry was campaigning against them, he suddenly died on 1 December at Lyons-la-Forêt.

The alliance between England and Normandy arranged by Henry, despite its difficulties, came to form the nucleus of the Angevin Empire, which would pose a threat to Louis's son, Louis VII of France. However, the Anglo-Norman realm collapsed into civil war as Stephen of Blois opportunistically seized the throne after Henry's death, even suffering an invasion from Scotland, and Stephen could pose no threat against the French crown. Louis VII, the king's son, married Eleanor of Aquitaine on 25 July 1137, bringing the Duchy of Aquitaine into the royal demesne for a time. Louis would die on 1 August.

== See also ==
- Integration of Normandy into the royal domain of the Kingdom of France
- Crown lands of France
- First Hundred Years' War

== Sources ==
- Aird, William M. (2008). Robert Curthose, Duke of Normandy: c. 1050–1134. Boydell & Brewer Ltd. ISBN 978-1-84383-310-9.
- Anderson, Erich B. (2017). "The Siege of Aalst: The Rise and Fall of William Clito". Medieval Warfare. 7 (5): 24–25. ISSN 2211-5129. JSTOR 48578117.
- Andrews, J. F. (2019). Lost Heirs of the Medieval Crown: The Kings and Queens Who Never Were. Pen and Sword. ISBN 978-1-5267-3652-9.
- Bradbury, Jim (2007). The Capetians: Kings of France 987–1328. Bloomsbury Publishing. ISBN 978-0-8264-3514-9.
- Carpenter, David A. (2003). The Struggle for Mastery: Britain, 1066–1284. Oxford University Press. ISBN 978-0-19-522000-1.
- David, Charles Wendell (1920). Robert Curthose, Duke of Normandy. Harvard University Press. OCLC 1084520465.
- Dunbabin, Jean (1985). France in the making, 843–1180. Oxford University Press. ISBN 9780198730309.
- Hallam, Elizabeth M.; Everard, Judith (2001). Capetian France, 987–1328. Longman. ISBN 978-0-582-40428-1.
- Halphen, Louis (1926). "France: Louis VI and Louis VII (1108–1180)". In J. R. Tanner; C. W. Previté-Orton; Z. N. Brooke (eds.). The Cambridge Medieval History: Contest of Empire and Papacy. Vol. V. Macmillan. pp. 592–623. OCLC 1041608763.
- Hicks, Sandy (1981). "England's King Henry I and the Flemish Succession Crisis of 1127–1128". Quidditas. 2 (1): 41–49.
- Hollister, C. Warren (2003). Frost, Amanda Clark (ed.). Henry I. Yale University Press. ISBN 978-0-3000-9829-7.
- King, Edmund (2010). King Stephen. Yale University Press. ISBN 978-0-300-17010-8.
- Morillo, Stephen (2019). "The Battle of Brémule". Medieval Warfare. 9 (5): 6–9. ISSN 2211-5129. JSTOR 48653100.
- Tanner, Heather (2004). Families, Friends and Allies: Boulogne and Politics in Northern France and England, c. 879–1160. Brill. ISBN 978-90-474-0255-8.
- Verbruggen, J. F. (1977). The Art of Warfare in Western Europe During the Middle Ages: From the Eighth Century to 1340. Boydell & Brewer. ISBN 978-0-85115-570-8.
