= Helias of Saint-Saëns =

Count of Arques (died 1128)

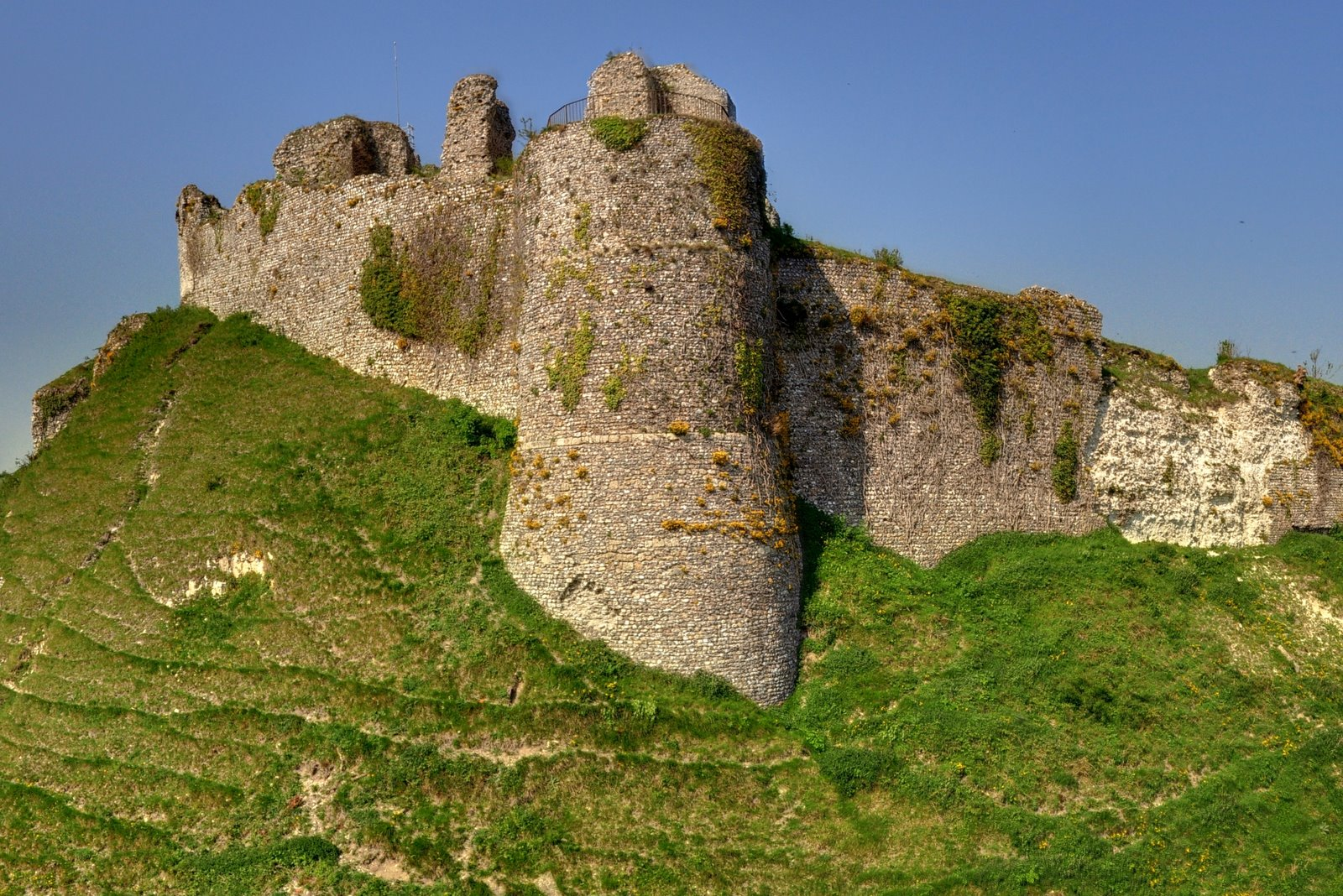
Fortress of Arques-la-Bataille built in 1040

Helias of Saint Saëns (?–1128), Count of Arques was a Norman magnate of the eleventh and twelfth century, a loyal supporter of Robert Curthose and protector of his son William Clito. His support of the latter eventually brought him into conflict with Henry I of England, ending in his willing exile from Normandy.

== Life ==
Helias was an important baron in Upper Normandy who held the fortress-stronghold of Saint-Saëns. In 1090 he supported William Rufus against his brother Duke Robert of Normandy and led the attack on Rouen. But within a year, Duke Robert gave him an illegitimate daughter in marriage, whose maritagium included the county of Arques along with the lordship of Bures-en-Bray. From this time on, Helias was a loyal supporter of Duke Robert and later to his son William Clito.

In 1094, William Rufus crossed over from England and, after failing at diplomacy, raised an army of mercenaries at Eu and attacked south into Normandy. His first victory was in capturing Helias' castle of Bures-en-Bray, at the time garrisoned by Duke Robert's men. During the period from 1104 to 1106, Helias supported Robert Curthose, but in 1106 after the Battle of Tinchebray (in which Robert Curthose was captured and imprisoned by Henry) Helias seems to have been on curiously good terms with Henry I. Secure in his victory, Henry encountered young William Clito, Duke Robert's son, at Falaise. To show he was compassionate, he placed the boy, then about three years old, under the protection of Count Helias. By the time William Clito was seven or eight, he had become the focal point of resistance to Henry I's rule of Normandy and support was growing for William to be Henry's rival for Normandy and perhaps even England.

In 1111, Henry I ordered Robert de Beauchamp, Viscount of Arques, to capture his nephew, William Clito, at the castle of Saint-Saëns. Helias was absent from the castle at the time, but before the Viscount arrived, the boy was taken out of Normandy to join Helias. The boy and his protector eventually found safe haven at the court of Baldwin VII, Count of Flanders. Meanwhile, Robert de Beauchamp seized the castle of Saint-Saëns and held it for Henry I, who then gave it to his cousin (consobrinus) William de Warenne, 2nd Earl of Surrey. At the Battle of Bremule in 1119, William Clito fought on the side of Louis VI of France, but for some reason Helias did not participate in the battle. Fighting against Thierry of Alsace, William Clito died in July 1128 of an infected wound suffered during a siege. His followers, including Helias, kept his death a secret and kept fighting. William had written letters to his uncle, Henry I, asking for his followers to be pardoned; Henry did as requested. Some followers returned to Henry I while others set out for the crusade.

Helias died about 1128.

== Family ==
His father was Lambert of Saint-Saëns, who was a son of Richard de Lillebonne, viscount of Rouen. He descended from one of the nieces of Gunnor, Duchess of Normandy, and hence was a distant cousin of the English royal family.
