= Matilda of Anjou =

Duchess of Normandy in 1120

- Duchess of Normandy
- Born: c. 1111; Anjou
- Died: 1154 (aged 42–43); Fontevraud Abbey
- Spouse: William Adelin (m. 1119; died 1120)
- House: Anjou
- Father: Fulk, King of Jerusalem
- Mother: Ermengarde, Countess of Maine

Matilda of Anjou, also known as Mahaut (c. 1111 – 1154) was married in 1119 to William Adelin, son and heir apparent of Henry I of England. She became the second abbess of the powerful medieval abbey of Fontevrault.

== Life ==
Matilda was the daughter of Count Fulk V of Anjou and Countess Ermengarde of Maine. In February 1113, Fulk V and Henry I met near Alençon where they entered into a treaty of peace which was secured by the betrothal of Henry's son William Adelin and Fulk's daughter Matilda. The young couple were married in June 1119, when Matilda was around eight years old.

On the evening of 25 November 1120, returning from Normandy to England, William Adelin chose to sail aboard the White Ship and subsequently drowned when that ship sank in the English Channel just outside Barfleur harbour. Matilda had avoided the disaster, as passage for her had been arranged aboard another ship, presumably the one that her father-in-law was traveling on. William's death left her a widow at less than ten years of age. Thus ended the treaty between England and Anjou.

On his return from Jerusalem, c. 1121–1122, Fulk V demanded the return of Matilda's dowry, comprising castles and towns in Maine, to which Henry flatly refused. After months of fruitless quarreling, Fulk considered warring with Henry once more. Finally, Fulk countered Henry by marrying his other and older daughter, Sibylla, to William Clito, the son of Robert Curthose, Henry's nephew and rival for Normandy. Fulk dowered the couple with the lordship of Maine. However, Henry I prevailed upon the pope to annul this marriage on grounds of consanguinity in 1124.

Meanwhile, after her husband's death, Matilda remained at Henry's court and was treated as one of the king's daughters. Henry maintained that she could remain as long as she wished, (Note: Orderic contradicts himself on this point: he states that she was a guest who could stay as long as she likes in one sentence, then in another states she was detained at court by Henry, implying she was not free to leave. Given the state of affairs between Anjou and England between 1120 and 1123, the second scenario seems more plausible. See Orderic Vitalis, trans. Forester, Vol. IV (1856), p. 38.) and intended to marry her to one of his great nobles, "heaping on her wealth and honours which would have raised her above all her family." She remained in England for several years, unmarried, but according to Orderic, wishing to see her parents and home, she returned to Anjou. After a time in Anjou, Matilda, who had remained a virgin, took the advice of Geoffrey, Bishop of Chartres, and took her vows as a nun at Fontevrault Abbey in 1128 at the age of 17. Both her father, Fulk V, and her grandmother, Bertrada of Montfort, had been an early and significant patrons of the Abbey.

She became the second abbess of Fontevrault in 1150. During her tenure, she mitigated attempted encroachment on the independence of the abbey from the Bishop of Poitiers, which resulted in a Papal Bull cementing the independence of the powerful abbey. Matilda also laid the foundation for the eventual expansion of the Fontevrault Order into England. She died in 1154.

== Sources ==
- Hanley, Catherine (2022). Two Houses, Two Kingdoms: A History of France and England, 1100-1300. Yale University Press.
- Hicks, Sandy Burton (1976). "The Anglo-Papal Bargain of 1125: The Legatine Mission of John of Crema". Albion: A Quarterly Journal Concerned with British Studies. 8 (4 (Winter)): 301–310. doi:10.2307/4048183. JSTOR 4048183.
- Hollister, C. Warren (1984). Brown, R. Allen (ed.). "War and Diplomacy in the Anglo-Norman World: the reign of Henry I". Anglo-Norman Studies VI: Proceedings of the Battle Conference 1983. The Boydell Press.
- Hollister, C. Warren (2003). Henry I. Yale University Press.
- Hollister, C. Warren; Keefe, Thomas K. (1973). "The Making of the Angevin Empire". Journal of British Studies. 12 (2 (May)): 1–25. doi:10.1086/385639.

Matilda of Anjou Angevin kings of England Born: c. 1111 Died: c. 1154
Royal titles
Vacant Title last held by Matilda of Scotland	Duchess consort of the Normans; 1119 – 25 Nov 1120	Vacant Title next held by Adeliza of Louvain
