= Thomas FitzStephen =

Sea captain

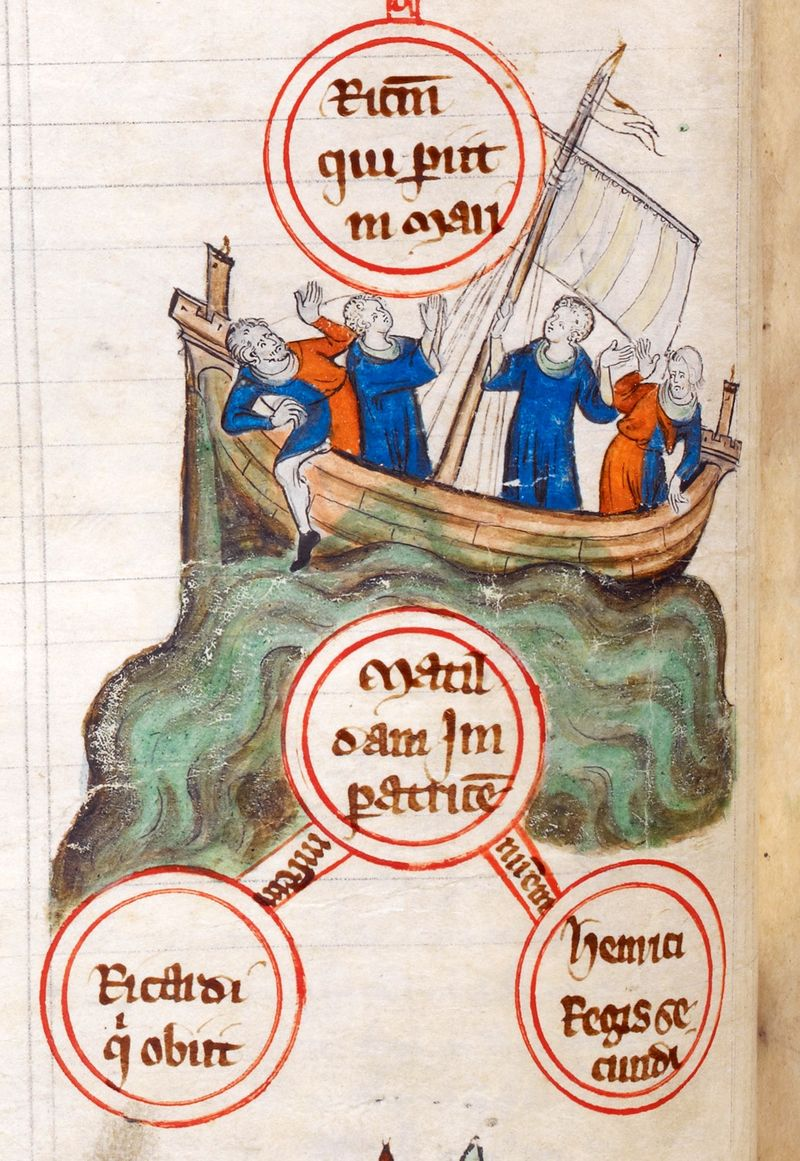
The sinking of the White Ship, from British Library, Cotton Claudius dii, f45v, dated to about 1320

Thomas FitzStephen (Old French: Thomas fiz Estienne; died 1120) was captain of the ill-fated White Ship (French: la Blanche-Nef), which sank off Barfleur, Normandy, on 25 November 1120.

== Life ==
FitzStephen was the son of Stephen FitzAirard (Old French: Estienne fiz Airard), the captain of the Mora, the ship which brought William the Conqueror over from Normandy during his invasion of England in 1066. FitzStephen owned and captained the White Ship, which at that time was docked at Barfleur harbour. When Thomas FitzStephen presented himself to the king he said:

"Stephen, my father, served yours all his life by sea, and he it was who steered the ship in which your father sailed for the conquest of England. Sire king, I beg you to grant me the same office in fief: I have a vessel called the Blanche-Nef, well equipped and manned with fifty skilful mariners."

Henry had already made other arrangements, but gave permission for his sons William Adelin and Richard, as well as the young nobles in William's entourage, to travel on it instead. According to Orderic Vitalis, the nobles as well as the crew were drinking.

By the time the ship was ready to leave, there were about 300 people on board, although some had disembarked before the ship sailed due to the excessive drinking. FitzStephen and his crew were challenged by the revelers to overtake the king's ship which had already sailed. The White Ship was fast, of the best construction and had recently been fitted with new materials, which made the captain and crew confident they could reach England first. However, when the ship set off in the dark, its port side struck a submerged rock and the ship quickly capsized and sank. The loss of life was devastating – according to Orderic Vitalis only one survived, by clinging to the rock all night: a butcher from Rouen. Orderic also claims that FitzStephen let himself drown rather than face the wrath of King Henry I, as Henry's son William Adelin had been among those drowned. (Note: Stephen of Blois, the king's nephew by his sister Adela, was among the entourage and had boarded the ship but had disembarked just before it sailed due to illness. The death of William Adelin in the White Ship caused a succession crisis leading to The Anarchy and ultimately to Stephen becoming King of England.)
