= Matilda FitzRoy, Countess of Perche =

Illegitimate daughter of Henry I of England

Matilda FitzRoy
- Countess of Perche
- Reign: 1103–1120
- Born: c. 1080/1100
- Died: 25 November 1120
- Noble family: Normandy
- Spouse: Rotrou III, Count of Perche (m. 1103)
- Issue: Philippa, Countess of Maine; Felicia
- Father: Henry I of England
- Mother: Edith

Matilda "Maud" Fitzroy (c. 1080/1100 – 25 November 1120), Countess of Perche, was among several members of the English royal family who died in the wreck of the White Ship off Barfleur.

== Life ==
Matilda, or Maud, was an illegitimate daughter of King Henry I of England by a mistress identified only as Edith. (Note: Her mother Edith held lands in Devon as late as 1130 and so survived her daughter. See Cokayne, The Complete Peerage, Vol XI (1949), p. 112 note (a).) Nothing is known of her mother's family. Her father was the youngest son of William the Conqueror and his wife Matilda of Flanders.

During the High Middle Ages, illegitimate children were not always acknowledged by their fathers (and so many remained unknown) but Henry I recognised at least 20 of his illegitimate children, including Maud. She was identified as his daughter by Orderic Vitalis, who added that the king built up her husband's power by greatly augmenting his estates and wealth in England. Her father gave her lands in Wiltshire as her dowry.

In 1103, Matilda married Rotrou III, Count of Perche, as his second wife. She married at the same time as her half-sister Juliane de Fontevrault. Rotrou was a direct vassal of King Henry in England, where he held fiefs jure uxoris, in right of his wife. He also was given the de Bellelme fief in Normandy at the forfeiture of Robert de Belleme.

== White Ship ==
In the wreck of the White Ship, the evening of 25 November 1120, William of Malmesbury noted the fate of the countess:

the water having washed some of the crew overboard and entering the chinks drowned others, the boat was launched, and the young prince getting into it might certainly have been saved by reaching the shore, had not his illegitimate sister, the countess of Perche, now struggling with death in the larger vessel, implored her brother's assistance, shrieking out that he should not abandon her so barbarously. Touched with pity, he ordered the boat to return to the ship, that he might rescue his sister; and thus the unhappy youth met his death through excess of affection; for the skiff, overcharged by the multitude who leaped into it, sank, and buried all indiscriminately in the deep. Thus William Adelin perished trying to save his sister Maud.

== Family ==
Matilda and Rotrou had two daughters:

- Philippa, married Elias II, Count of Maine and had issue
- Felicia

== Notes ==
Preceded by Beatrice de Montdidier	Countess of Perche; 1103–1120	Succeeded by Havise de Salisbury
