= Mora (ship) =

William the Conqueror's flagship

The Bayeux Tapestry's depiction of the Mora, marked by the papal banner on the masthead.

Mora was the name of the flagship of William the Conqueror, the largest and fastest ship in his invasion fleet of 700 or more ships (Note: The size of the fleet has been estimated of something between 696 and 3,000 ships of all sizes which transported an estimated 10,000 men, 2,000 to 3,000 horses, and all supplies sufficient to support the invasion forces. At the time of the Norman invasion of England, it was considered the largest amphibious operation since the early days of the Roman Empire. See: Bernard S. Bachrach, 'On the Origins of William the Conqueror's Horse Transports', Technology and Culture, Vol. 26, No. 3 (Jul., 1985), p. 505-531. Also see: Edd Wheeler, 'The Battle of Hastings: Math, Myth and Melee', Military Affairs, Vol. 52, No. 3 (Jul., 1988), p. 128-134.) used during the Norman conquest of England in 1066.

== The ship ==
Mora was a ship of clinker construction built at Barfleur in Normandy, a gift of Matilda of Flanders to her husband William, Duke of Normandy, in the summer of 1066. She was a larger ship and carried ten knights with their entourages and equipment. (Note: A large ship could carry 40 to 45 armed men (not counting the ship's crew) or ten to twelve knights, whose entourage and equipment required more ship space. Edd Wheeler, 'The Battle of Hastings: Math, Myth and Melee', Military Affairs, Vol. 52, No. 3 (Jul., 1988), p. 128-134.) The ship was captained by Stephen Fitz Airard, meaning the son of Airard, (Note: His son was Thomas FitzStephen, the captain of the famous White Ship, which sank in the English Channel off the Normandy coast in 1120. See: Elisabeth M.C, van Houts, 'The Ship List of William the Conqueror', Anglo-Norman Studies X: Proceedings of the Battle Conference 1987, Ed. R. Allen Brown (Woodbridge: The Boydell Press, 1988), p. 173.) who remained her captain until William's death in 1087. Stephen received lands in Hampshire, Berkshire, and Warwickshire as reward for his services in the English campaign of 1066. Orderic Vitalis describes the ship: "it had for its figurehead the image of a child, gilt, pointing with its right hand towards England, and having in its mouth a trumpet of ivory". Mora carried multicoloured sails and at the top of the mainmast was the papal banner, consecrated and sent to William from Rome. The banner was described as "a square white banner charged with a gold cross within a blue border."

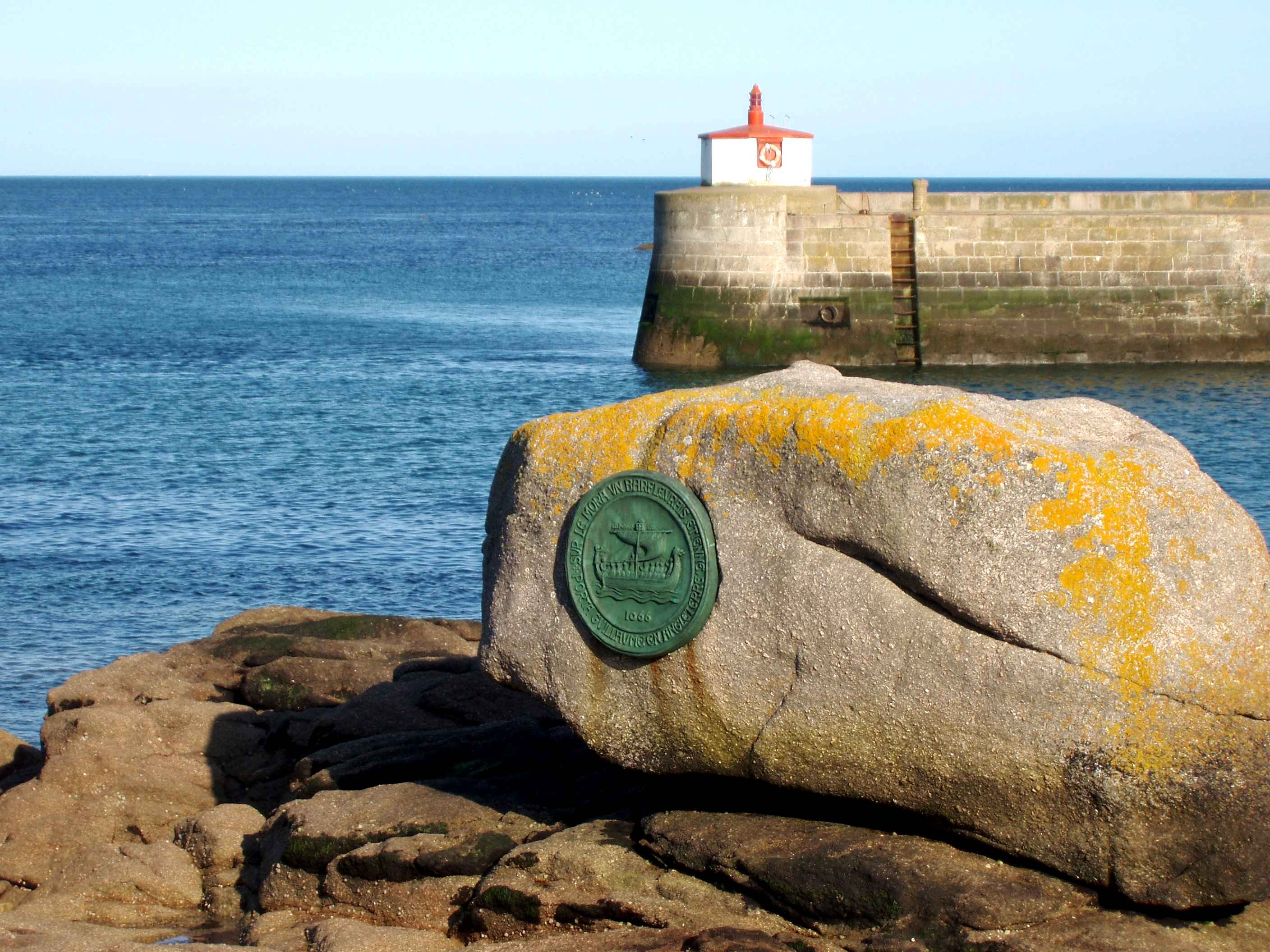
Plaque in Barfleur harbour commemorating the departure of William's ship the Mora in 1066

== Voyage to Pevensey ==
On the evening of 27 September 1066, before sunset according to William of Poitiers, Duke William's invasion fleet embarked for England with the Mora in the lead. She carried a lantern on her mast so she could be seen and a horn was blasted as a signal to the other ships following. Mora, larger than the other ships, was also much faster. William found himself in mid-channel, alone, with no other ships in sight at daybreak. Waiting for the others to catch up, he had breakfast with wine. Once the others were in sight the fleet proceeded to Pevensey in Sussex.

== Naming ==
According to Elisabeth van Houts, the meaning of the name is unknown although there have been several suggestions. She might have been named for the Morini, ancient inhabitants of Flanders, as a reference to Matilda's Flemish origins. The Latin word mora has several meanings, none of which seem likely. These range from 'delay' or 'pause' to 'foolish' or 'foolish woman'. There is also the possibility that Mora was an anagram of Amor (love).

In the academic paper "The multiple meanings of Mora, the flagship of William the Conqueror", Elisabeth Waugaman links it with the Stone of Mora, on which took place coronations in medieval Sweden. By naming the ship Mora, Elisabeth Waugaman suggests Matilda hoped to strengthen her husband's claims to royal legitimacy in the eyes of his many followers and potential critics.

== Replica ==
A French project announced in 2022 intended to build a seaworthy replica of Mora in Honfleur, Normandy. The project was estimated to cost 13 million dollars. The goal was to complete the ship by 2027 in order to sail the Channel on the 1,000th anniversary of William the Conqueror's birth. In September 2025, the group announced the project would not be completed due to budgetary issues.
