= Château de Barfleur =

Former castle in Normandy, France

- Barfleur, Normandy, France

Location
- Coordinates: 49°40′16″N 1°15′48″W

Château de Barfleur (French pronunciation: [ʃato də baʁflœʁ]) was a castle in Barfleur, Normandy, France.

== History ==
The Norman Earls of Chester held a castle at Barfleur in the 12th century. The city's fortifications were demolished in the 16th century by Jacques de Goyon, Marshall of France, under orders from Henry III of France.
