= Battle of Brémule =

1119 battle between Henry I of England and Louis VI the Fat of France

Coordinates: 49°20′36″N 1°24′21″E

- Part of Claim of William Clito
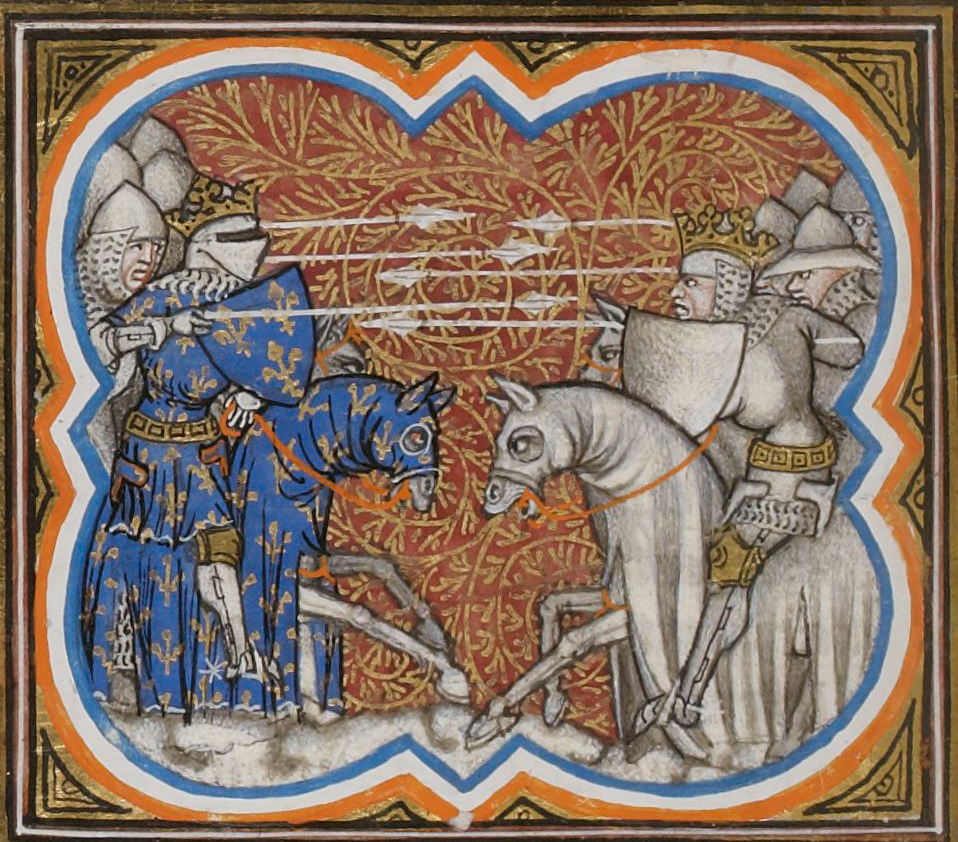
- Kings Louis and Henry at the Battle of Brémule
Date	20 August 1119
Location	Gaillardbois-Cressenville, Normandy
Result	Anglo-Norman victory

Belligerents
Kingdom of England: Duchy of Normandy	Kingdom of France: Rebellious Norman barons

Commanders and leaders
Henry I William Adelin	Louis VI; William Clito

Strength
500 knights	400 knights

Casualties and losses
Insignificant	140 knights captured

The Battle of Brémule was fought on 20 August 1119 between Henry I of England and Louis VI the Fat of France. Henry I had to defend his holdings in Normandy several times and his victory at this battle repelled a French invasion.

The French defeat at Brémule effectively crippled the barons' rebellion and led to King Louis' having to accept William Adelin as Duke of Normandy. William was officially invested with the duchy in 1120, even though King Louis continued to support William Clito's claim to the honour.

This battle is the result of a fortuitous encounter between the two neighbours who were engaged in a lawkeeping operation on their respective borders, the limits of their kingdoms being still imprecise in the Vexin and in the valley of the Seine.

Chronicles from the French side describe the battle as a fierce and bloody one where Louis the Fat, despite his heavy weight, fought so close to the opposing knights that a Norman seized his horse's reins and shouted, "The King is taken!", to which the King replied with a heavy blow from his mace, shouting back: "The King is not taken, neither at war, nor at chess!" However, this was later thought to be a misattribution.

On the other side, chronicles from the Norman side tell that their knights gained much profit from the ransoms paid by their many prisoners, and that they had only three casualties on their side.
