= Eleanor's House =

1907 short story by Willa Cather

- Short story by Willa Cather

Text available at Wikisource
- Country: United States
- Language: English
- Genre: Short story

Publication
- Published in: McClure's
- Publication type: Magazine
- Publication date: October 1907

"Eleanor's House" is a short story by Willa Cather. It was first published in McClure's in October 1907.

== Plot summary ==
Harold Forscythe and his new wife Ethel are visiting the Westfields, who live in Arques-la-Bataille. Harold admits to Harriet that he is still in mourning over his late wife. Later, he goes away as he does customarily. Ethel decides to join him at Fortuney near Pontoise, where he used to live with his late wife. Harriet will go with her. When they get there, the couple have a fight. Later however, Harriet tells her husband she is buying Harold's house in Fortuney - he is leaving for America with his wife, who is pregnant.

== Characters ==
- Mrs Harriet Westfield. She went to a convent in Paris with Eleanor in her youth.
- Mr Robert Westfield
- Harold Forscythe
- Ethel, Harold's new wife.
- Eleanor Sanford, Harold's late wife.

== References to other works ==
- Harriet mentions Antoine François Prévost's Manon Lescaut, and Alfred de Musset.

== Literary significance and criticism ==
Eleanor's House has been deemed to be clumsily Jamesian.
