= Battle of Axspoele =

Battle in 1128

Date	21 June 1128
Location	Ruiselede, near Thielt, Flanders 51.06°N 3.41°E
Result	Victory for William Clito

Belligerents
William Clito	Thierry of Alsace

Commanders and leaders
William Clito; Riquart of Woumen	Thierry of Alsace; Gervase of Praat; Frederick; Daniel of Termonde

Strength
450 mounted knights	300 mounted knights, 1,500 infantrymen
- Location within Belgium

The Battle of Axspoele (sometimes Axpoele or Thielt) took place on 21 June 1128 on the landed estate of the lords of Axpoele in the County of Flanders between William Clito and Thierry of Alsace. The two men were rivals for the title of Count of Flanders. William had been appointed to the title by Louis VI of France following the 1127 murder of Charles the Good but Thierry, cousin of Charles, had the support of Henry I of England. In 1128, Thierry secured the support of a number of Flemish cities, although most of the nobility supported William.

Thierry led a force of 300 mounted men-at-arms and 1,500 infantrymen to Axspoele on 19 June to lay siege to a castle held by one of William's supporters. William was aware of Thierry's movements and moved with a force of 450 men-at-arms to raise the siege. On arrival he recognized that most of Thierry's army was infantry and decided to give battle. He positioned two-thirds of his force on a hill in sight of Thierry's army and held the remainder in reserve, hidden on the reverse slope. Thierry ordered his cavalry to attack; after a brief engagement William ordered a feigned retreat and his reserves crushed Thierry's pursuing horsemen. This caused panic among Thierry's infantry who broke and fled, with William's men in close pursuit. However, William's victory was short-lived, as he died around a month later from a wound sustained in another action, and Thierry became Count of Flanders.

== Background ==
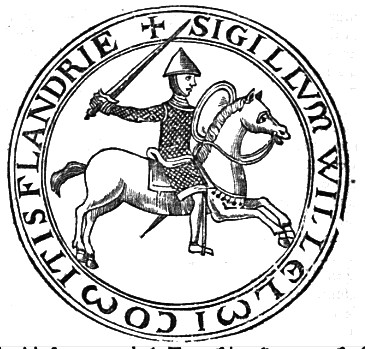
Seal of William Clito

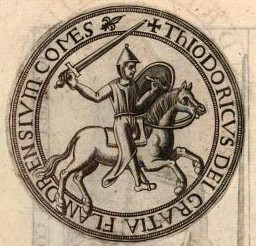
Seal of Thierry of Flanders

Charles the Good, Count of Flanders was murdered in March 1127 by local enemies. Louis VI of France, overlord of Flanders in this period, installed, by means of an invasion, Charles' cousin (and a pretender to the Duchy of Normandy) William Clito as heir, in preference to another of Charles' cousins Thierry of Alsace, a grandson of Robert I, Count of Flanders (r. 1071–1093). Thierry had the support of the English King Henry I who was also Duke of Normandy and an uncle to William Clito. Henry supported Thierry with bribes paid to William Clito's supporters to switch allegiance, with proved especially successful in Ghent and eastern Flanders.

Lille had come to Thierry's side in August 1127 and Saint-Omer rebelled against William Clito in February 1128 after he had appointed an unpopular castellan. The general assembly of Ghent then rebelled over failure of William Clito to honour a promise of a court session over his violation of the liberties of the cities of Flanders. Thierry promised to respect the liberties of the cities and Bruges, where William Clito had imposed liability for tolls, declared for Thierry on 30 March. Most of the nobility remained supporters of William Clito but Iwain of Alost and Daniel of Termonde declared for Thierry, bringing a number of Flemish knights to his cause. Additional military forces came from the cities, augmented by men from Ypres which first secretly and then openly supported Thierry.

On 18 and 19 June Thierry was at Ghent gathering an army. He afterwards moved to Axspoele, near Thielt, to lay siege to a castle belonging to a knight named Fulk, a supporter of William Clito. Thierry was joined there on 20 June by soldiers from Bruges, led by Gervase of Praat, and men from the coastal settlements.

The events following the murder of Charles the Good were chronicled in 1127 and 1128 by Galbert of Bruges in his day-by-day Latin account De multro, traditione et occisione gloriosi Karoli comitis Flandriarum of the events surrounding the murder of Charles the Good, in 1127 and its aftermath up through the accession of Thierry of Alsace in summer 1128. Galbert does not mention the exact location of this battle in his chronicle but Simon van Gent, the abbot of the abbey of Saint Bertin in Saint-Omer, mentions in his chronicle Gesta abbatum S. Bertini Sithiensium that this battle took place in the territory of Axspoele: "Post multa decem milia malorum, cum valida manu armatorum, in campo Hackespul, Willelmus et Theodericus ad prelium conveniunt, fugatoque Theoderico cum suis, Willelmo cessit victoria; sed in brevi victorie usus est leticia". The 1531 chronicle Dits die Excellente Chronijcke van Vlaenderen gives a brief account of the battle.

== Battle ==
Thierry's army was under observation by William Clito and he moved with 450 mounted men-at-arms to relieve the siege. En route William's force called at the Abbey of St. Peter in Oudenburg to receive the sacrament of penance. William ordered his men to cut their hair short and remove any opulent clothing as a sign of their penance. Thierry's army amounted to 300 mounted men-at-arms and 1,500 infantry, though 500 of the latter may have been left to continue to siege while he faced William Clito's troops. On arriving at Axspoele on 21 June William noted that the majority of Thierry's force was on foot and resolved to give battle.

William split his army into three approximately equal portions. Two of these were positioned on a hill overlooking Axspoele in full view of Thierry's force, and the third was hidden on the reverse slope. William was positioned in the front rank of one of the forward units and Riquart of Woumen commanded the other. Thierry, with Gervase, led one portion of his infantry and Frederick, a count, led the other; his cavalry was commanded by Daniel of Termonde.

Thierry sent his cavalry against William's army. They charged, probably quite slowly, uphill with the lance. The first clash saw Riquart unhorsed and taken prisoner before the knights of both sides discarded their lances and engaged with the sword. At this point William gave the order to retreat, potentially as a ruse to lure Daniel's cavalry into pursuing him. As Daniel's cavalry followed they were hit by William's 150-strong reserve which overwhelmed the tired attackers within seconds.

Thierry's cavalry was routed and as William's men advanced, panic struck Thierry's infantry who broke and ran, discarding their weapons. They were charged by William's cavalry, who discarded their armour to better pursue their foes. Thierry reached the safety of Bruges accompanied by only ten knights. His defeat was attributed by contemporaries to his failure to observe the rituals around inviting an enemy to enter battle at a mutually agreed time and place.

== Aftermath ==
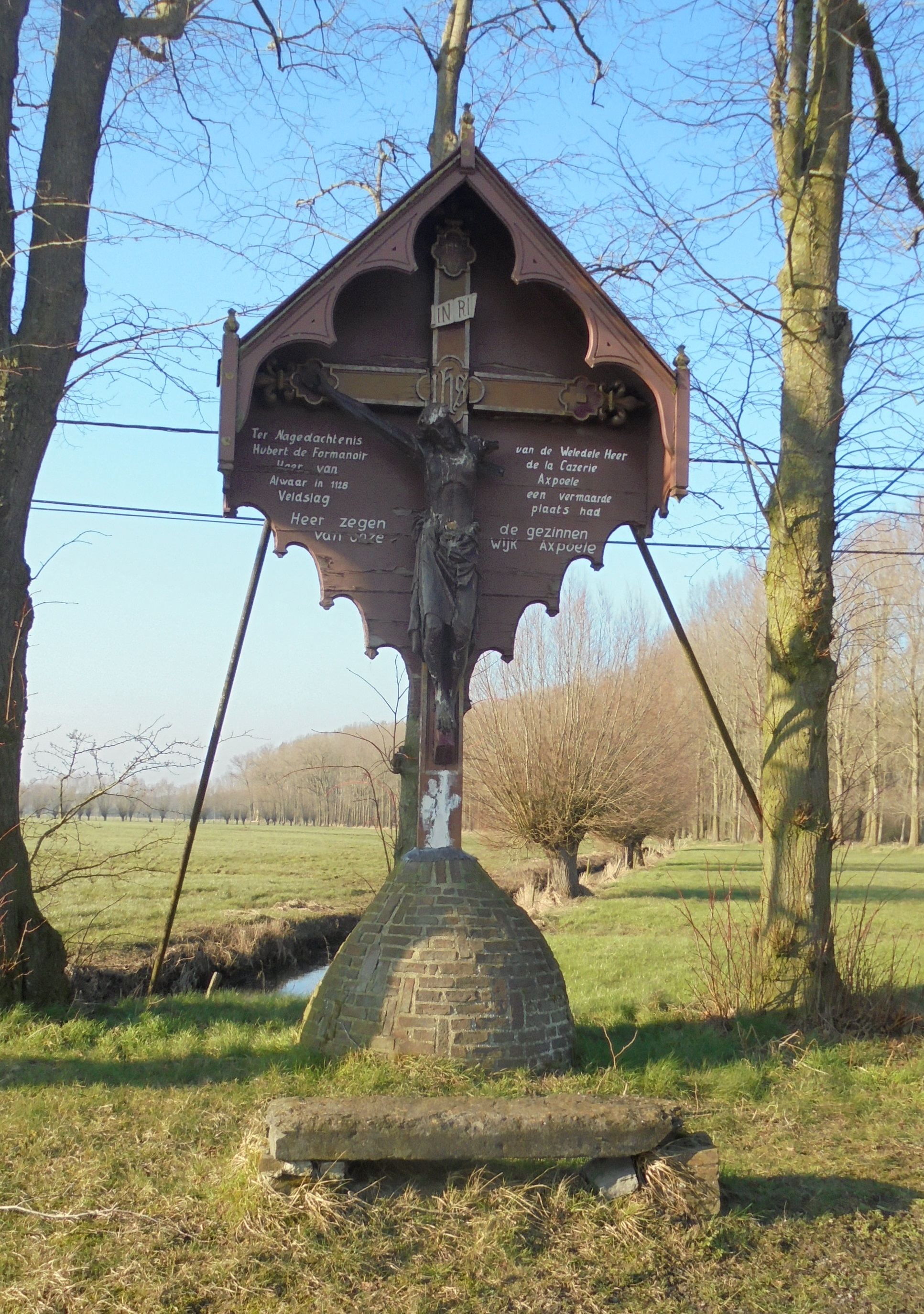
A 20th-century crucifix monument that mentions the battle and is dedicated to the Honorable Lord Hubert de Formanoir de la Cazerie, Lord of Axpoele.

During the battle William Clito captured a number of nobles and burghers for ransom. He afterwards marched 40 miles (64 km) south-west to Aalst near Brussels which he laid siege to from 12 July. The siege progressed well for William Clito but he suffered a minor wound to his hand that became infected and led to his death, without an heir, on 28 July 1128. His death left Henry I more secure in his position as Duke of Normandy. Thierry assumed the title of Count of Flanders and was confirmed in this role by Henry I and Louis VI, the latter with some reluctance.
