= William Adelin =

Heir apparent of Henry I of England (1103–1120)

- Duke of Normandy
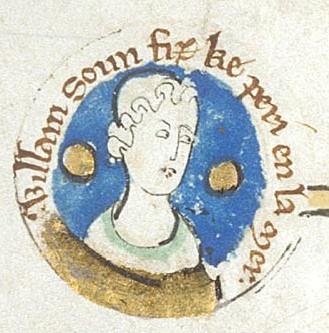
- Born: 5 August 1103; Winchester, Hampshire, England
- Died: 25 November 1120 (aged 17) near Barfleur, Duchy of Normandy
- Spouse: Matilda of Anjou (m. 1119)
- House: Normandy
- Father: Henry I of England
- Mother: Matilda of Scotland

William Ætheling (Middle English: [ˈwiliəm ˈaðəliŋɡ], Old English: [ˈæðeliŋɡ]; 5 August 1103 – 25 November 1120), commonly called Adelin (sometimes Adelinus, Adelingus, A(u)delin or other Latinised Norman-French variants of Ætheling) (Note: Adelin derives from the Germanic element adel, meaning 'noble', and is equivalent to the Old English word æthele 'noble'. Adelinus is thus equivalent to the term "Ætheling" used for English princes prior to the Norman Conquest. The Latin term clito (also meaning 'noble') was sometimes used instead, such as in the case of William Adelin's cousin, William Clito. See "Ætheling" in the Blackwell Encyclopaedia of Anglo-Saxon England and the 1911 Encyclopædia Britannica.) was the son of Henry I of England by his wife Matilda of Scotland, and was thus heir apparent to the English throne. His early death without issue caused a succession crisis, now known in English history as the Anarchy.

== Early life ==
William was born in Winchester. His father, King Henry I of England, had married his mother, Matilda of Scotland, to conciliate his English subjects. Matilda was descended from Edmund Ironside and was a great-niece of Edward the Confessor; as such, the marriage represented a union between the new Norman rulers of England and the old Anglo-Saxon dynasty.

Henry's hopes for his succession rested upon William, who was, according to Henry of Huntingdon, "a prince so pampered" that he seemed "destined to be food for the fire."

== Duke of Normandy ==
During Henry I's lifetime, William was invested as Duke of Normandy, a title he held more in name than in practice. Henry made the investiture when he was pressed by the king of France, Louis VI, to do homage as Duke of Normandy. As a king in his own right, Henry was loath to comply, and in 1115 he offered to have William do this in his stead. This offer was eventually accepted in 1120, after an intervening period of war, and William did homage to Louis VI in the middle of 1120. For this reason, William is sometimes counted as Duke of Normandy (as either William III or William IV). (Note: William Clito, son of Robert Curthose and William's first cousin, is also sometimes designated 'Duke of Normandy'.) William received, as the heir to the throne, the homage and fealty of the barons of Normandy in 1115 and of the barons of England in March 1116.

William's mother Queen Matilda served as Henry's regent in England while he was away in Normandy. After her death in 1118, William was old enough to serve in her stead. He was closely advised in this role by the King's administrators, such as Roger of Salisbury. During the last year or so of his life, he was sometimes referred to as rex designatus (king designate).

During his 35-year reign, Henry I of England faced several eruptions of hostilities due to the alliances of rival regions with some of his neighbours. To secure the loyalty of Anjou, a long-time rival of Normandy, Henry betrothed William to Matilda of Anjou, eldest daughter of Count Fulk V of Anjou in February 1113 near Alençon. Their marriage took place in June 1119 in Lisieux.

== Death ==
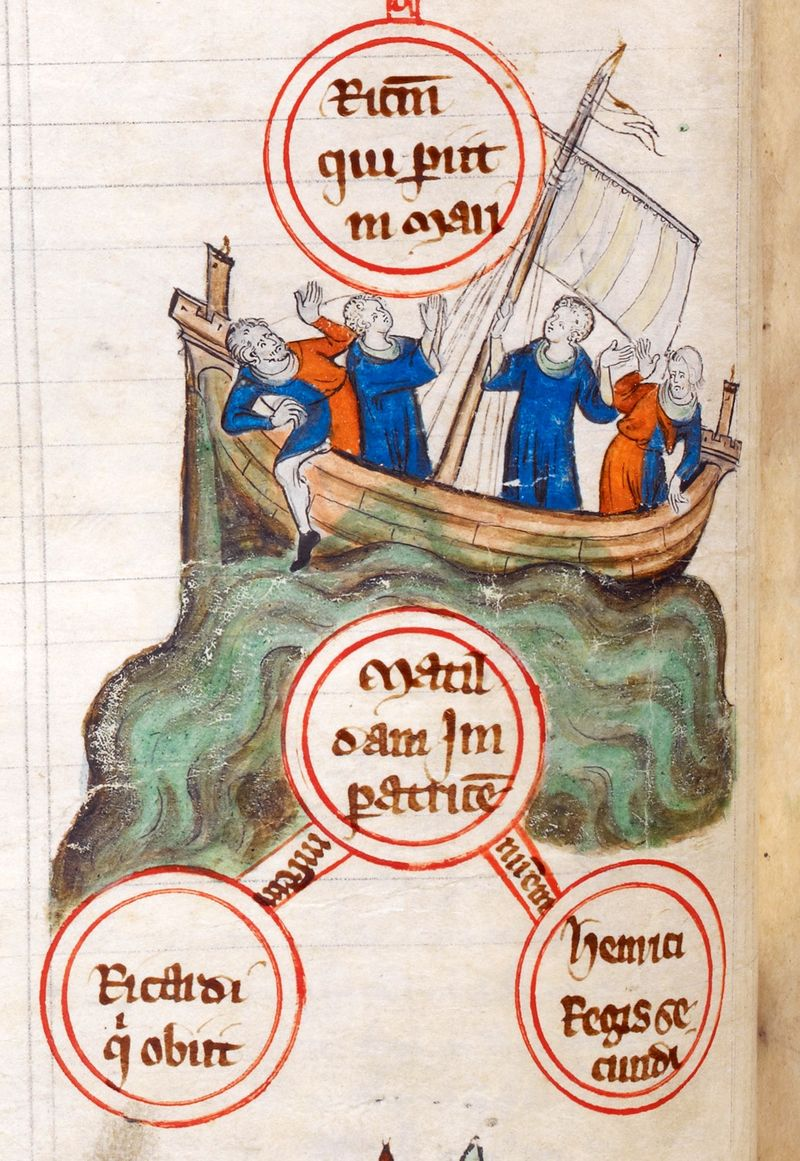
An early 14th-century depiction of the sinking of the White Ship at Barfleur on 25 November 1120

William died in the White Ship tragedy of 25 November 1120. The Duke and his companions had been crossing the English Channel from Barfleur in the Blanche-Nef, the swiftest and most modern ship in the royal fleet. William and his party had remained drinking on the shore until after dark, confident that in a fast ship and on the still sea the delay would have no real effect. Consequently, it was the middle of the night when the drunken helmsman, captained by Thomas FitzStephen, rammed the ship into a rock in the bay.

The crew and passengers could not lever the ship off the rock, or prevent the ship from filling with water. William and several of his friends managed to launch a life-dinghy. At the last minute, William dashed back to rescue his illegitimate half-sister, Matilda FitzRoy, Countess of Perche. When they and several others threw themselves into the small dinghy, it, "overcharged by the multitude that leapt into her, capsized and sank and buried all indiscriminately in the deep."

Henry of Huntingdon, speaking of the disaster, wrote that William, "instead of wearing embroidered robes ... floated naked in the waves, and instead of ascending a lofty throne ... found his grave at the bottom of the sea." William's wife, Matilda, was on another ship at the time of the wreck. William's death left the succession to his father uncertain. After King Henry died in 1135, William's sister Empress Matilda and cousin Stephen of Blois waged a long war for the English throne in what is known as The Anarchy.

== Notes ==
William Adelin House of Normandy Born: 5 August 1103 Died: 25 November 1120
Regnal titles
Preceded by Henry I	Duke of Normandy; 5 August – 25 November 1120	Succeeded by Henry I
