= Arques-la-Bataille =

- Commune
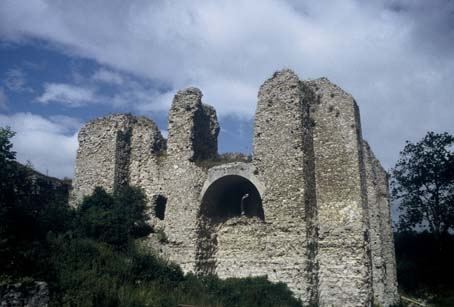
- Château d'Arques-la-Bataille

- Coat of arms
- Location of Arques-la-Bataille
- Location within France Location within Normandy
- Coordinates: 49°52′54″N 1°07′37″E
- Country: France
- Region: Normandy
- Department: Seine-Maritime
- Arrondissement: Dieppe
- Canton: Dieppe-2
- Intercommunality: CA Région Dieppoise

Government
  - Mayor (2026–32): Maryline Fournier
- Area^{1}: 14.69 km^{2} (5.67 sq mi)
- Highest elevation: 129 m (423 ft)
- Lowest elevation: 2 m (6.6 ft)
- Population (2023): 2,412
  - Density: 164.2/km^{2} (425.3/sq mi)
- Time zone: UTC+01:00 (CET)
  - Summer (DST): UTC+02:00 (CEST)
- INSEE/Postal code: 76026 /76880
- ^{1} French Land Register data, which excludes lakes, ponds, glaciers > 1 km^{2} (0.386 sq mi or 247 acres) and river estuaries.

Arques-la-Bataille (French pronunciation: [aʁk la bataj]) is a commune in the Seine-Maritime department in the Normandy region in north-western France.

The zoologist Henri Marie Ducrotay de Blainville (1777–1850) was born in Arques.

== Geography ==
Arques is situated near the confluence of the rivers Eaulne, Varenne and Béthune, with the forest of Arques to the north-east. It lies 6 kilometres (4 mi) southeast of Dieppe at the junction of the D23, D154, and D56 roads.

== Population ==
Historical population
| Year | Pop. | ±% p.a. |
|---|---|---|
| 1968 | 2,807 | — |
| 1975 | 2,646 | −0.84% |
| 1982 | 2,734 | +0.47% |
| 1990 | 2,539 | −0.92% |
| 1999 | 2,528 | −0.05% |
| 2007 | 2,527 | −0.00% |
| 2012 | 2,603 | +0.59% |
| 2017 | 2,583 | −0.15% |
| 2023 | 2,412 | −1.14% |
Source: INSEE

== Main sights ==
The centre houses a castle dominating the town, which was built in the 11th century by William of Talou; his nephew, William the Conqueror, regarding it as a menace to his own power, besieged and occupied it. After frequently changing hands, it came into the possession of the English, who were expelled in 1449 after an occupation of thirty years. In 1589, its cannon decided the Battle of Arques in favour of King Henry IV of France.

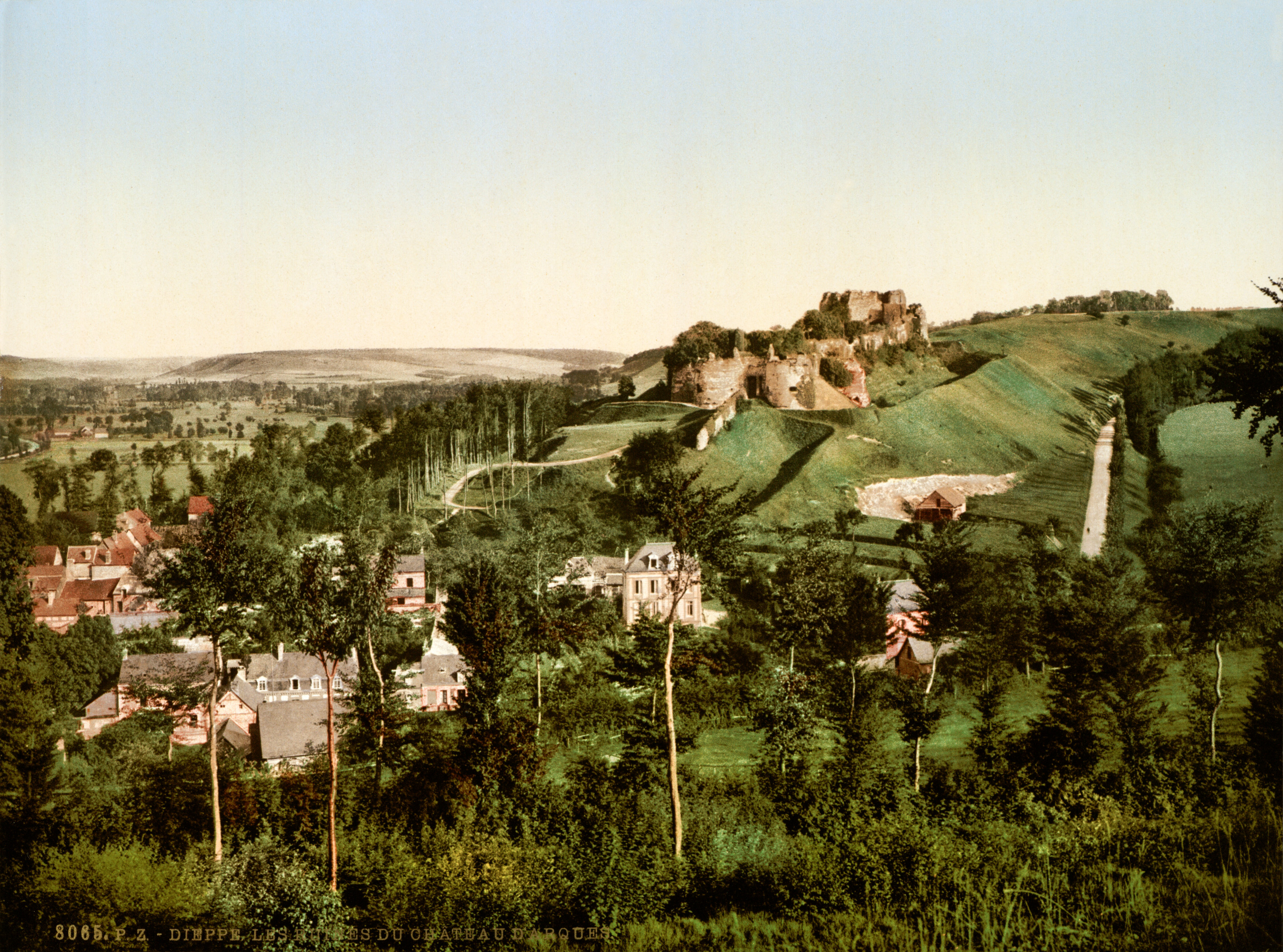
The ruined château dominating the town

Since 1869, the castle has been state property. The first line of fortification was the work of Francis I; the second line and the donjon date back to the 11th century. The church of Arques, a building of the 16th century, preserves a stone rood screen, statuary, stained glass and other relics of the Renaissance period.

Just outside the town is the World War I Commonwealth War Graves Commission cemetery, designed by J R Truelove, the final resting place of 377 men of the Chinese, West Indies, and South African Native Labour Corps.

== Cultural references ==
- Willa Cather's 1907 short story Eleanor's House is set in Arques-la-Bataille.
- Simon Raven's 1984 novel September Castle revolves around ancient hauntings in the Castle of Arques, and is set in the region.l
- John Henry Twachtman's painting, Arques-la-Bataille (1885) hangs in the Metropolitan Museum of Art in New York City.
- Oscar Wilde spent his first afternoon in freedom in France together with his friend Robby Ross visiting the castle ruin.

== See also ==
- Communes of the Seine-Maritime department
- Chinese Labour Corps
