= White Ship disaster =

12th-century shipwreck, killing the heir to the English throne

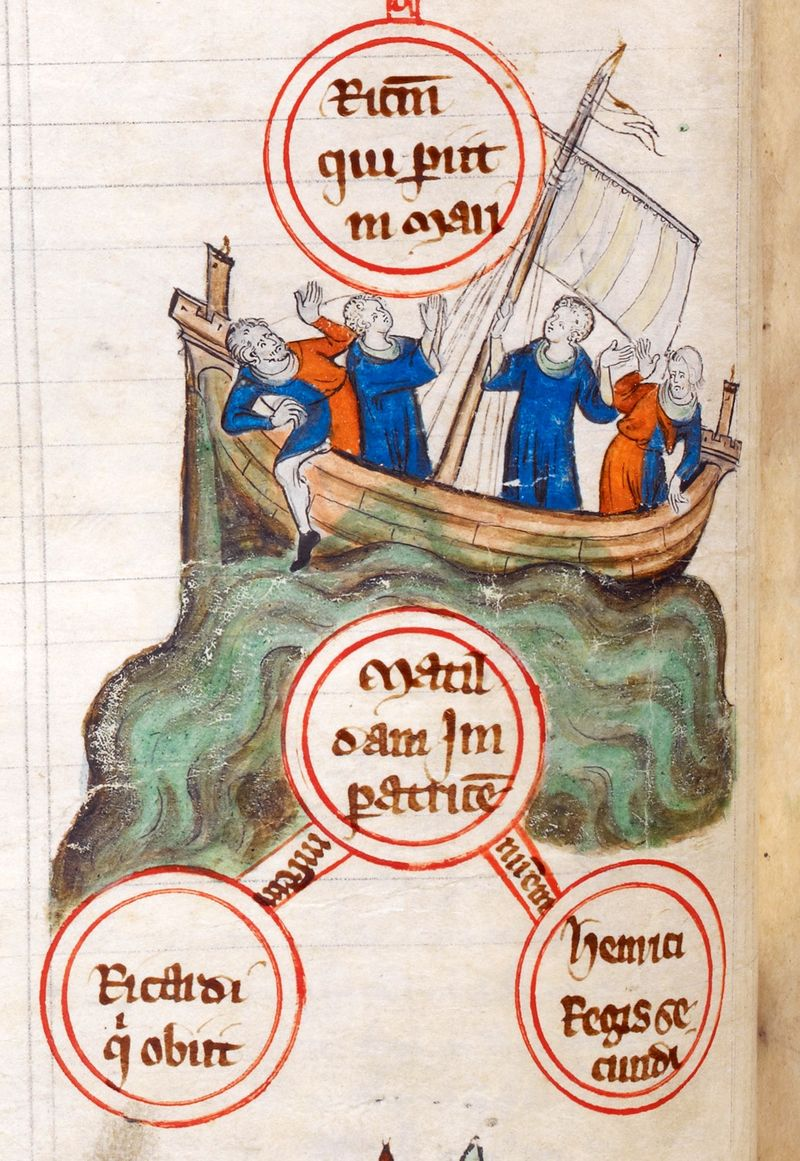
The White Ship sinking

The White Ship (French: la Blanche-Nef; Medieval Latin: Candida navis) was a vessel transporting many nobles, including the heir to the English throne, that sank in the English Channel near the Normandy coast off Barfleur during a trip from France to England on 25 November 1120. Out of approximately 300 people aboard, only one – a butcher from Rouen – survived.

Those who drowned included William Adelin, the only legitimate son and heir of Henry I of England; his half-siblings Matilda "Maud" FitzRoy and Richard of Lincoln; Richard d'Avranches, Earl of Chester; and Geoffrey Ridel. With William Adelin's death, the king had no obvious successor, and his own death 15 years later set off a succession crisis and a period of civil war in England known as the Anarchy (1135–1153).

== Shipwreck ==
The White Ship was a newly refitted vessel captained by Thomas FitzStephen (Thomas filz Estienne), whose father Stephen FitzAirard (Estienne filz Airard) had been captain of the ship Mora for William the Conqueror during the Norman Conquest of England in 1066. Thomas offered his ship to Henry I of England to return to England from Barfleur in Normandy. Henry had already made other arrangements, but allowed many in his retinue to take the White Ship, including his heir, William Adelin, his illegitimate children Richard of Lincoln and Matilda FitzRoy, Countess of Perche, and many other nobles.

According to the chronicler Orderic Vitalis, the crew asked William for wine and he supplied it to them in great abundance. By the time the ship was ready to leave there were about 300 people on board, although some, including the future king Stephen of Blois, had disembarked due to the excessive drinking before the ship sailed. Orderic attributes this to a sudden bout of diarrhoea.

FitzStephen was ordered by the revellers to overtake the king's ship, which had already sailed. The White Ship was fast, of the best construction and had recently been fitted with new materials, which made the captain and crew confident they could reach England first. However, when it set forth in the dark, its port side struck the submerged Quilleboeuf Rock, and the ship quickly capsized.

William got into a small boat and could have escaped but turned back to try to rescue his half-sister, Matilda, when he heard her cries for help. His boat was swamped by others trying to save themselves, and William drowned along with them. According to Orderic, Berold (Beroldus or Berout), a butcher from Rouen, became the sole survivor of the shipwreck by clinging to the protruding mast of the sunken ship. The chronicler further wrote that when FitzStephen came to the surface after the sinking and learned that William had not survived, he let himself drown rather than face the king.

A legend holds that the ship was doomed because priests were not allowed to board it and bless it with holy water in the customary manner. (Note: Guillaume de Nangis wrote that the White Ship sank because all the men aboard were sodomites. See: Chron. in Rolls series, ed. W. Stubbs (London, 1879), vol. 2, under A.D. 1120. This reflects the medieval belief that sin caused pestilence and disaster. See also: Codex Justinian, nov. 141. Another theory is expounded by Victoria Chandler, "The Wreck of the White Ship", in The final argument: the imprint of violence on society in medieval and early modern Europe, edited by Donald J. Kagay and L.J. Andrew Villalon (1998). Her theory discusses the possibility of it being a mass murder.) For a complete list of those who did or did not travel on the White Ship, see Victims of the White Ship disaster.

== Repercussions ==
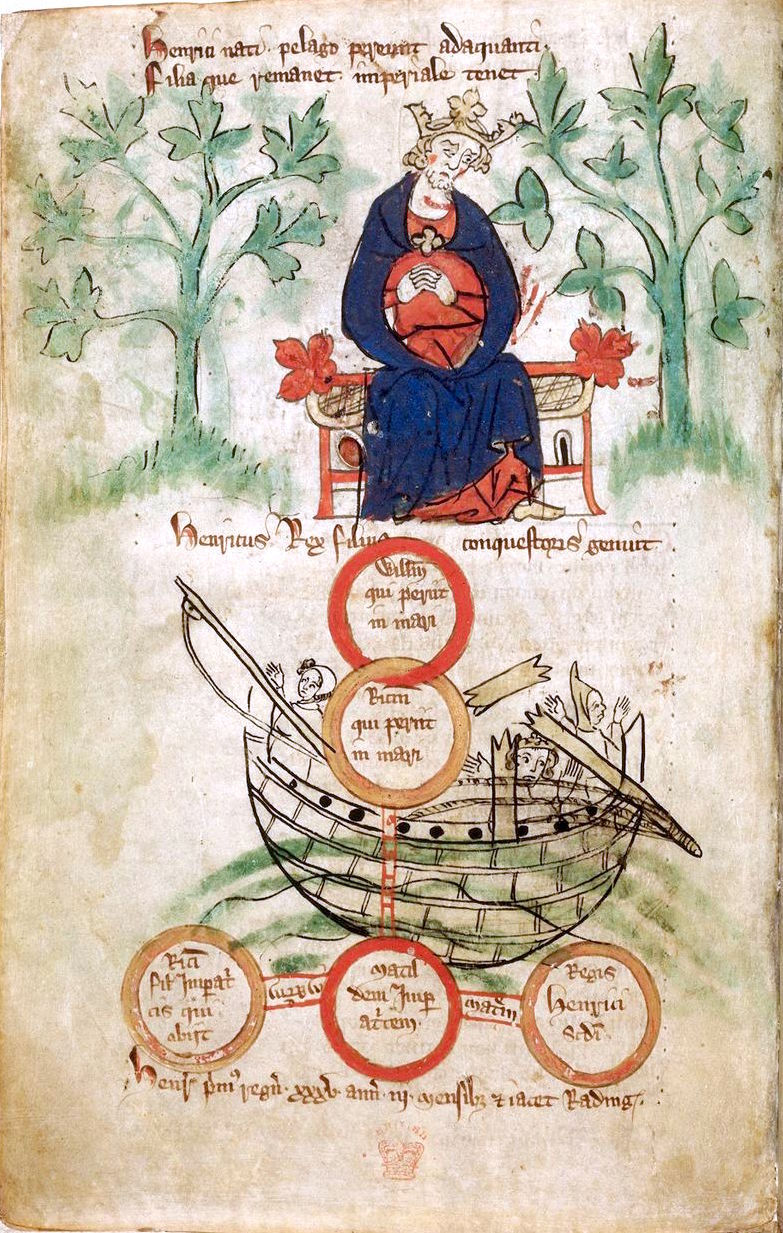
King Henry I grieves the sinking of the White Ship

A result of William Adelin's death was the period eighteen years later known as the Anarchy. The White Ship disaster had left Henry I with only one legitimate child, a second daughter named Matilda. Although Henry I had forced his barons to swear an oath to support Matilda as his heir on several occasions, she was unpopular due to her marriage to Geoffrey V, Count of Anjou, a rival of Normandy, as well as her gender. Upon Henry's death in 1135, the English barons were reluctant to accept Matilda as queen regnant.

Stephen of Blois, Henry I’s nephew by his sister Adela, usurped Matilda as well as his older brothers William and Theobald to become king.

After Henry I's death, Matilda and her husband Geoffrey of Anjou, the founder of the Plantagenet dynasty, launched a long war against Stephen and his allies for control of the English throne. The Anarchy lasted from 1138 to 1153 with devastating effect, especially in southern England.

Contemporary historian William of Malmesbury wrote:

No ship that ever sailed brought England such disaster, none was so well known the wide world over. There perished then with William the king's other son Richard, born to him before his accession by a woman of the country, a high-spirited youth, whose devotion had earned his father's love; Richard earl of Chester and his brother Othuel, the guardian and tutor of the king's son; the king's daughter the countess of Perche, and his niece, Theobald's sister, the countess of Chester; besides all the choicest knights and chaplains of the court, and the nobles' sons who were candidates for knighthood, for they had hastened from all sides to join him, as I have said, expecting no small gain in reputation if they could show the king's son some sport or do him some service.

== Historical fiction ==
- Reference to the sinking of the White Ship is made in Ken Follett's novel The Pillars of the Earth (1989). The ship's sinking sets the stage for the entire background of the story, which is based on the subsequent civil war between Matilda (referred to as Maud in the novel) and Stephen. In Follett's novel, it is implied that the ship may have been sabotaged; this implication is seen in the TV adaptation – even going so far as to show William Adelin assassinated while on a lifeboat – and the video game adaptation.
- Ellen Jones, The Fatal Crown (1991)
- Sharon Kay Penman describes the sinking in detail in her historical novel When Christ and His Saints Slept (1994).
- The sinking of the White Ship is briefly referenced in Glenn Cooper's novel The Tenth Chamber (2010).
- The White Ship sets the stage for the 2009 novel Hiobs Brüder (The Brothers of Job) by the German author Rebecca Gablé, which details the rise of Henry II of England, son of Empress Matilda.
- The long conflict between Stephen and Matilda is important in the Brother Cadfael series. This 20-book set of mysteries, by Ellis Peters, has a 12th-century Benedictine monk as its protagonist. Depending on the book, the conflict is either very important or serves as a backdrop to the plots. The sinking directly affects the outcome of the short story "A Light on the Road to Woodstock".

== Poetry ==
The Kelmscott Press publication of Rossetti's poem on the White Ship, as part of their Ballads and Narrative Poems edition of his work.

- Felicia Hemans, "He Never Smiled Again", c. 1830
- Dante Gabriel Rossetti, "The White Ship: a ballad"; first published 1881 in his collected Ballads and Sonnets.
- Edwin Arlington Robinson, "Ballad of a Ship", 1891
- Geoffrey Hill, "The White Ship". In his first book, For the Unfallen, 1959.
