= Barfleur =

- Commune
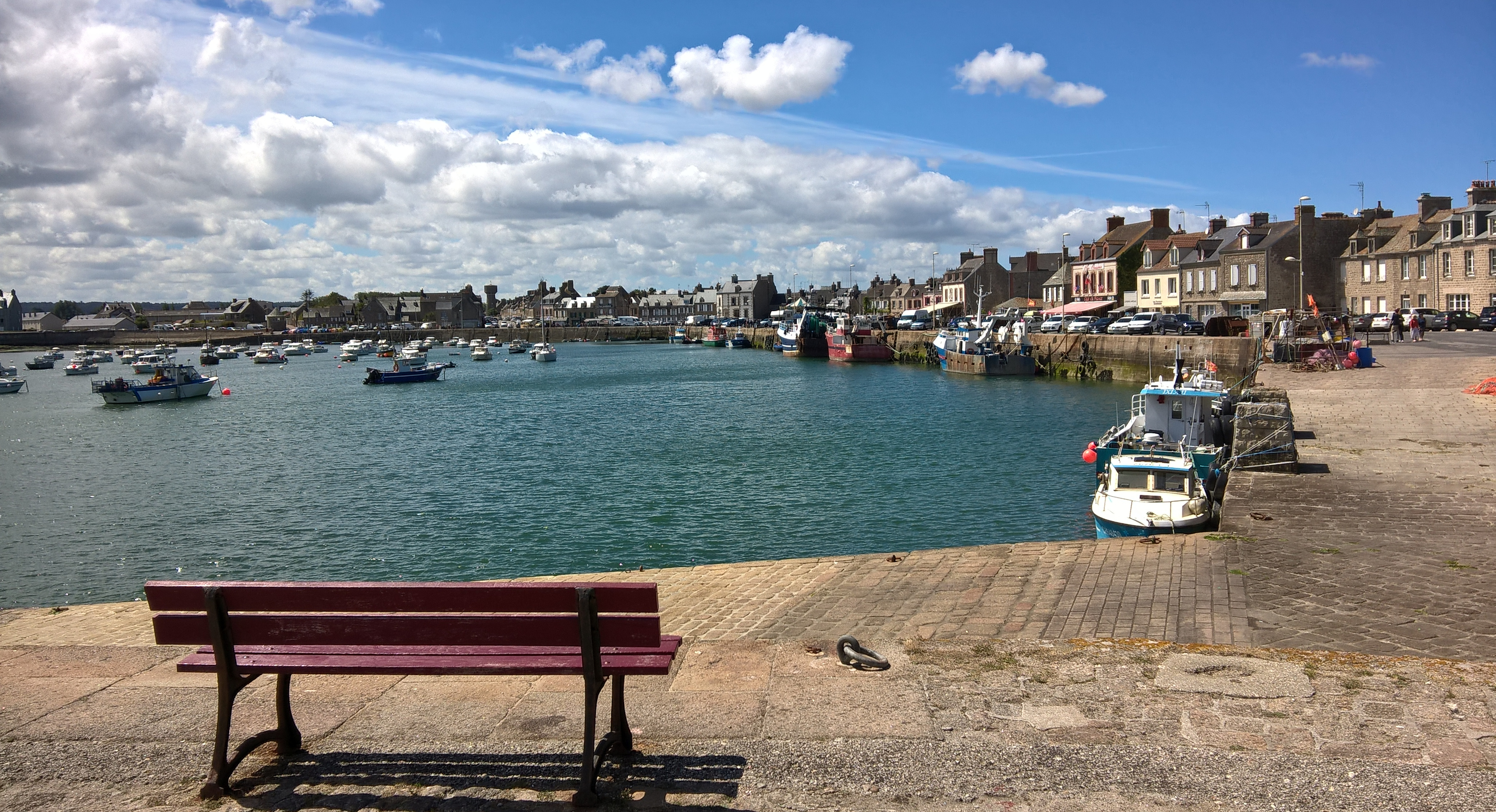
- Barfleur harbour
- Location of Barfleur
- Location within France Location within Normandy
- Coordinates: 49°40′16″N 1°15′48″W
- Country: France
- Region: Normandy
- Department: Manche
- Arrondissement: Cherbourg
- Canton: Val-de-Saire
- Intercommunality: CA Cotentin

Government
  - Mayor (2024–2026): Christiane Tincelin
- Area^{1}: 0.6 km^{2} (0.23 sq mi)
- Elevation: 4 m (13 ft)
- Population (2023): 542
  - Density: 900/km^{2} (2,300/sq mi)
- Time zone: UTC+01:00 (CET)
  - Summer (DST): UTC+02:00 (CEST)
- INSEE/Postal code: 50030 /50760
- ^{1} French Land Register data, which excludes lakes, ponds, glaciers > 1 km^{2} (0.386 sq mi or 247 acres) and river estuaries.

Barfleur (French pronunciation: [baʁflœʁ]) is a commune and fishing village in Manche, Normandy, northwestern France. It is a member of Les Plus Beaux Villages de France (The Most Beautiful Villages of France) Association.

== History ==
During the Middle Ages, Barfleur was one of the chief ports of embarkation for England.

- 1066: A large medallion fixed to a rock in the harbour marks the Normans' departure from Barfleur before the battle of Hastings.
- 1120: The White Ship, carrying the sole legitimate heir to Henry I of England, William Adelin, went down approximately a mile northeast of the harbour, setting the stage for the period of civil war in England known as the Anarchy.
- 1194: Richard I of England departed from Barfleur on return to England following his captivity by Henry VI, Holy Roman Emperor.
- 1692: Action at Barfleur, part of the battles of Barfleur and La Hougue
- 1944: Barfleur was occupied by the Germans during WWII. As allied forces approached following the D-Day invasion, the German commander evacuated the city prior to any confrontation to ensure that it would not be damaged, as he liked the city so much.

== Demographics ==
Historical population
Year	Pop.	±% p.a.
1968	837	—
1975	703	−2.46%
1982	619	−1.80%
1990	599	−0.41%
1999	642	+0.77%
2007	659	+0.33%
2012	641	−0.55%
2017	570	−2.32%
2023	542	−0.84%
Source: INSEE

== Geography ==
The commune is close to the northeastern tip of the Cotentin Peninsula. About two miles (3.2 km) to the north is Cape Barfleur, with a lighthouse 233 feet (71 m) high. It is twinned with Lyme Regis in the UK. A Brittany Ferries vessel is named after the village and operates from nearby Cherbourg-Octeville to Poole in the UK.

Barfleur is very close to being the exact antipode of New Zealand's Antipodes Islands.

== See also ==
- Communes of the Manche department
