= Sybilla Corbet of Alcester =

English noblewoman, mistress of Henry I (c. 1077–1157)

Lady Sybilla Corbet of Alcester (c. 1077 – 1157) was an English noblewoman and mistress of King Henry I of England. She was the mother of five of his children and was sometimes known as Lucy or Adela.

== Life ==
Sybilla was born in Alcester, Warwickshire. She was a daughter and co-heiress of Robert Corbet, Lord of Alcester, and his wife Adele of Alcester. She was a mistress of King Henry I. She married Herbert FitzHerbert, Chamberlain of England and son of Herbert of Winchester and Emma of Blois, shortly after giving birth to her last child by the king. She died after 1157 and was survived by her husband, who died in 1165.

== Issue ==
Sybilla is thought to be the mother of five of Henry I's illegitimate children:

- Sybilla of Normandy (c. 1092 – 1122), married King Alexander I of Scotland, no issue
- William Constable (c. 1105 – aft. 1187)
- Reginald of Dunstanville (c. 1110 – 1175), 1st Earl of Cornwall, married Mabel FitzWilliam, daughter of William FitzRichard
- Gundred of England (1114–1146), married William de Tracy, son of Turgisus de Tracy, had issue
- Rohese of England (b. 1114), married Henry de la Pomeroy in 1130, son of Joscelin de la Pomerai

With her husband Herbert FitzHerbert, Sybilla had:

- Robert FitzHerbert (b. 1116)
- Herbert FitzHerbert

== Sources ==
- van Houts, Elisabeth (2019). Married Life in the Middle Ages, 900–1300. Oxford University Press.
