= Montivilliers Abbey =

Former Benedictine nunnery in Seine-Maritime, France

Coordinates: 49°32′42″N 0°11′34″E

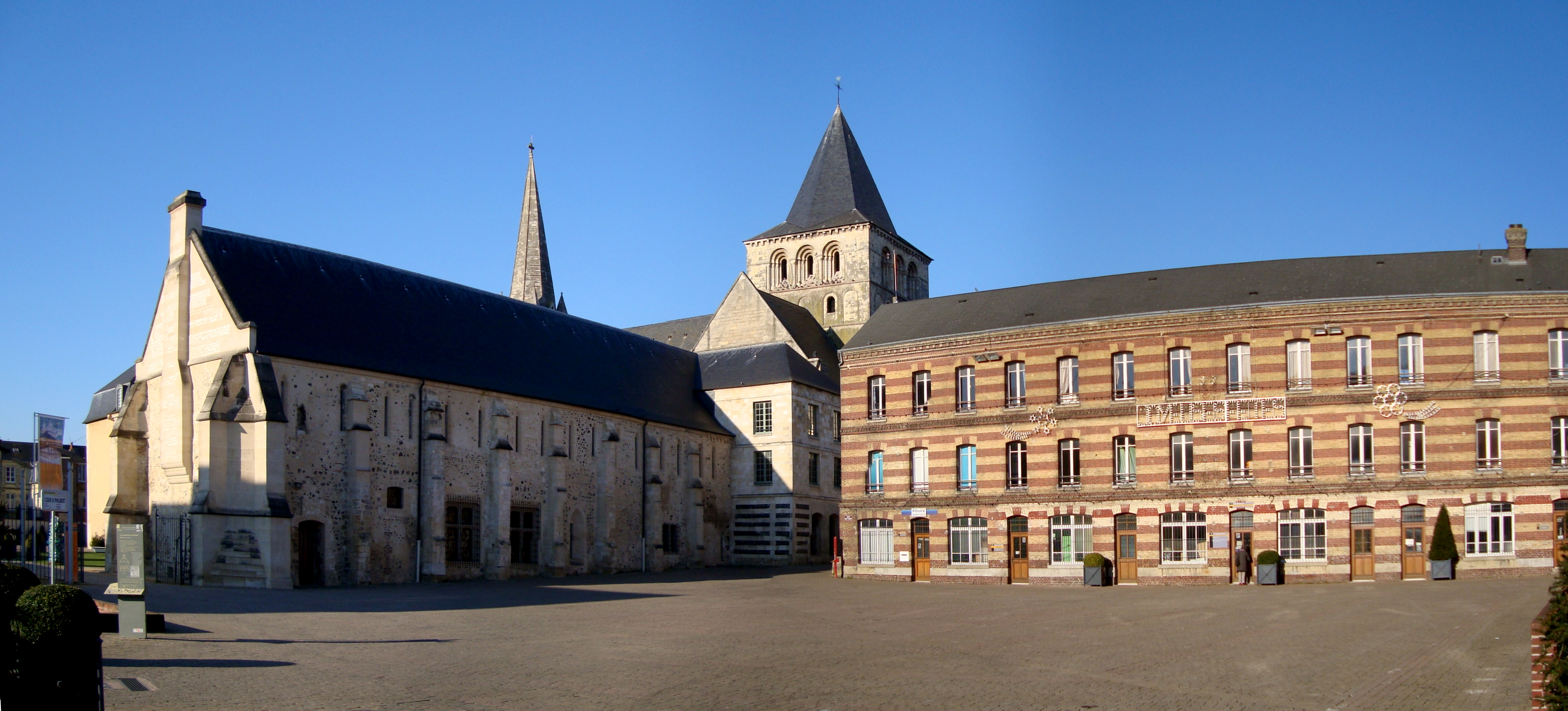
Montivilliers Abbey

Montivilliers Abbey (French: Abbaye de Montivilliers; Latin: Monasterium Villare) is a former Benedictine nunnery, founded between 682 and 684 (1342 years ago) by Saint Philibert in the town of Montivilliers in Normandy, in the present department of Seine-Maritime, France. It was suppressed during the French Revolution, but many buildings, including the church, have survived.

== History ==
Montivilliers Abbey began as a nunnery founded around 684. Mentioned in 833, this monastery was completely destroyed by the Vikings in the 9th century. The abbey was rebuilt in 1025 by Richard II of Normandy for a community of monks dependent on Fécamp Abbey. On 13 January 1035, at a meeting held in Fécamp, Robert I of Normandy granted it autonomy as a nunnery once again, for the benefit of his aunt Beatrice.Robert, with the agreement of Robert, Archbishop of Rouen, also granted Montivilliers an exemption from all episcopal custom.

The re-founded abbey was endowed with numerous estates in the region, and these made it possible, during the time in office of the Abbess Elisabeth in the second half of the 11th century, to undertake the construction of the great abbey church, an excellent example of Norman architecture at the time of William the Conqueror. On 6 April 1192, the abbey was placed under the special protection of the Holy See.

In the 15th century, the parish of Saint-Sauveur, which had been granted the first seven bays of the nave of the abbey church, had the north side knocked down so as to double its size with a large Gothic extension. From the 16th to the 18th century, the abbey continued to have great influence, especially under the direction of the Abbess Louise de L'Hospital (1596-1643), during whose time in office the abbey was reformed, in 1602.

The abbey was suppressed during the French Revolution and the nuns were expelled in 1792, after which the buildings underwent an intense and varied occupation (offices, prison, garrison, shops, stables, etc.) during the revolutionary period. They were sold off in 1811, and used for industrial purposes: as a cotton spinning mill, then as a sugar refinery and finally as a brewery from 1857. They were later converted into warehouses, garages and living quarters.

In 1975, the municipality of Montivilliers initiated a review of the future of the abbey site, which was favourably concluded in 1977. The first phase of the work allowed the installation in 1994 of the Condorcet library in the Abbesses' Lodging. The second phase, carried out from 1997 to 2000, enabled the restoration of the spaces to their original architecture, the creation of the "Cœur d'Abbaye" show trail and the fitting out of a room for temporary exhibitions in the Gothic refectory.

== The abbey church ==
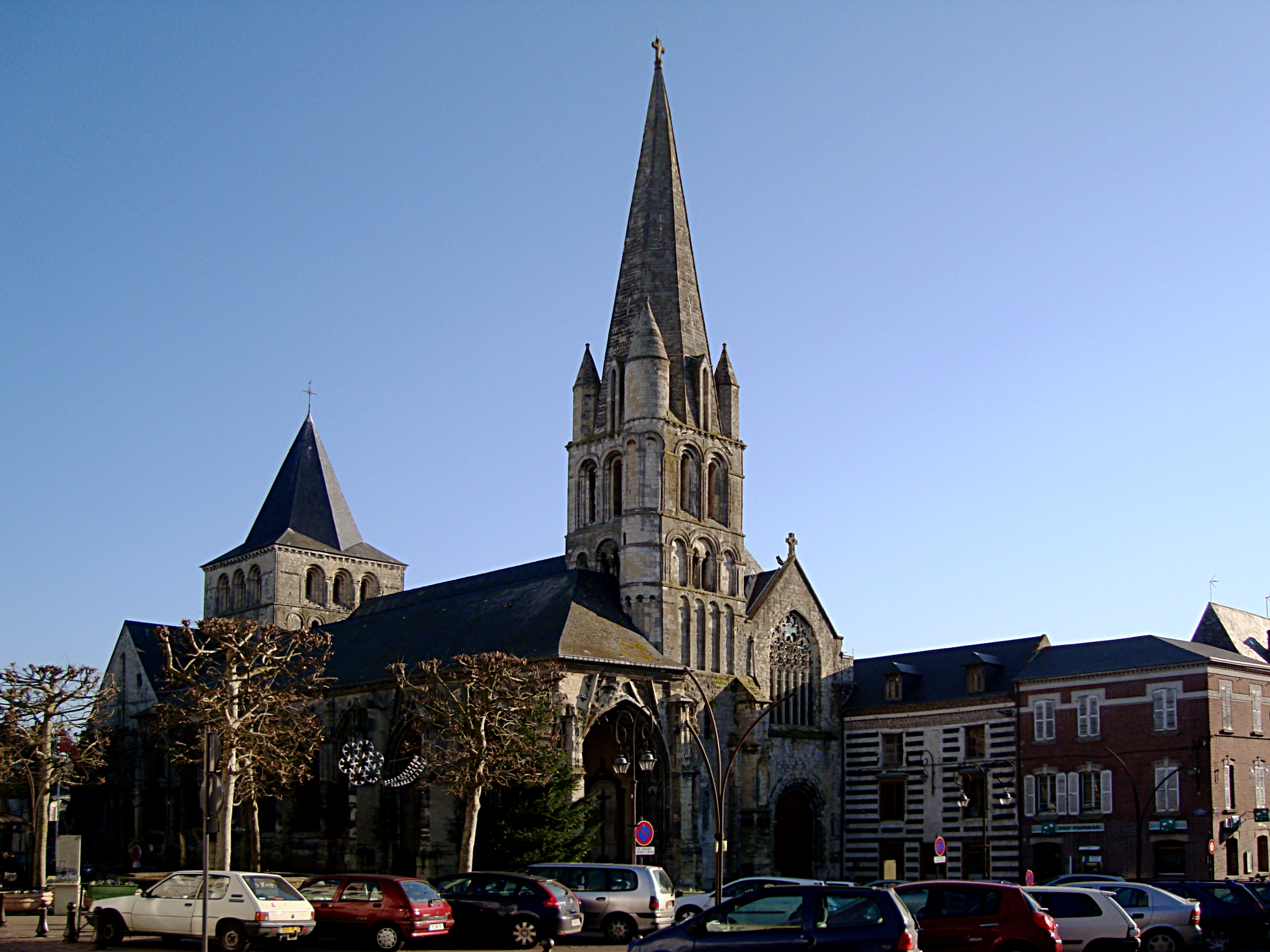
The abbey church

The original plan of the 11th-century church, of Benedictine type, was modified in the 15th century. At the crossing, however, the church has retained a monumental bell tower from the late 11th century.

The façade dates from the first half of the 12th century. It was originally supposed to have two towers, like the churches of Jumièges and Boscherville, but only the northern one has survived. Above the Romanesque portal, a large Gothic window was added in the 14th century.

In the nave, only the south side, restored in the 19th century, is still Romanesque. In the Flamboyant Gothic style, the nave is illuminated by the large windows of six adjoining chapels.

At the crossing, a 17th-century vault hides the 12th-century vault. The arms of the transept are covered with rib vaults of archaic style, without keys, separated by a band decorated with chevrons (bâtons brisés). The semicircular arch that opened onto the southern apse chapel shows twenty keystones carved with anecdotal scenes or stylised animals.

The choir, three bays deep and much modified in the 17th century, still reveals its primitive Romanesque structure, especially in the high columns that marked the start of the semicircle of the apse.

The abbey church was classified as a monument historique by the 1862 list and various parts of the abbey were classified in 1992.

The abbey's organ is by Louis Debierre whose centenary was celebrated on 27 September 1992 with a recital given by Pierre Pincemaille.

== The abbey ==
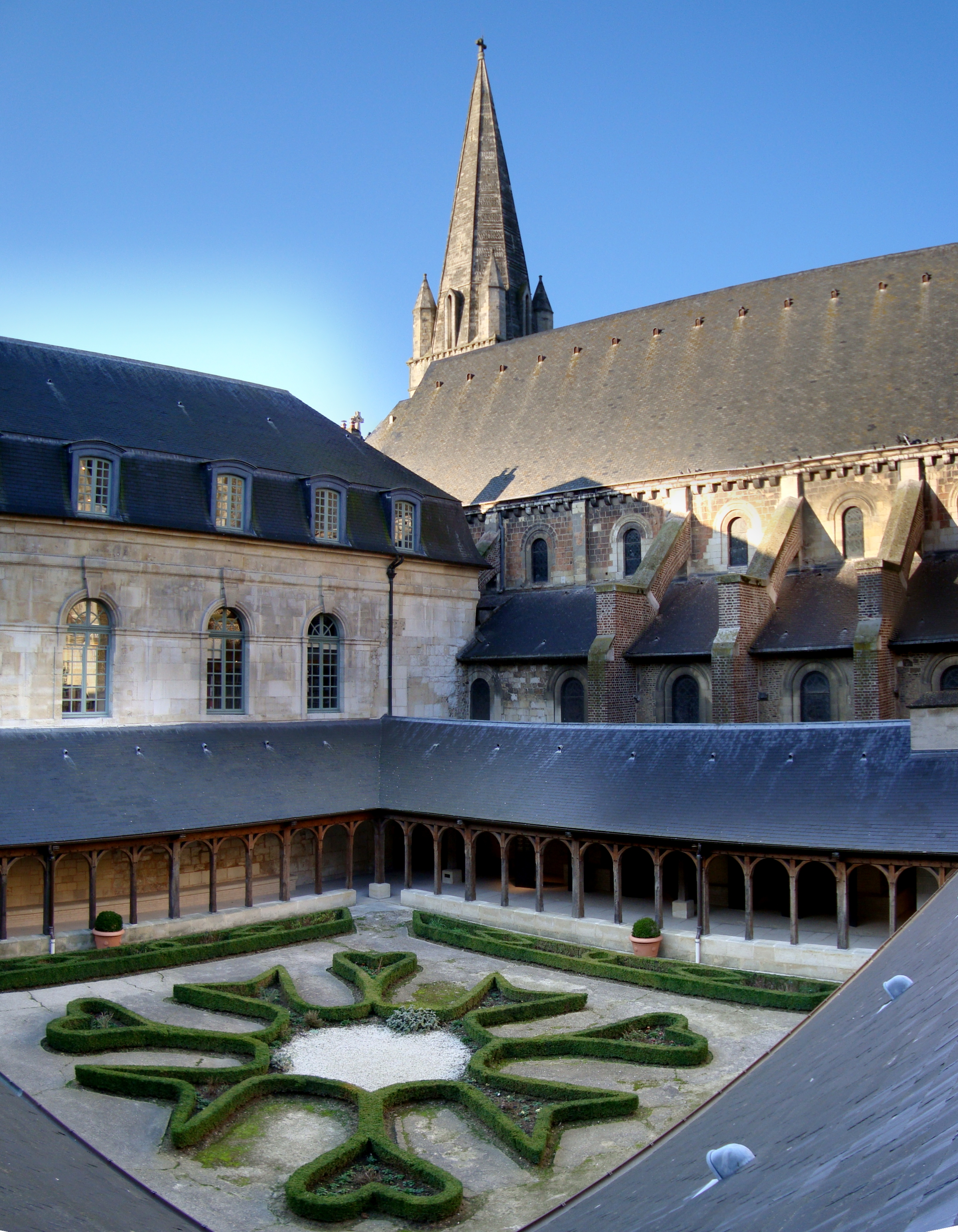
The abbey cloister

The cloister itself, whose original appearance is unknown, had completely disappeared and was reconstructed during the recent restoration. It is bordered to the west by the former residence of the abbesses, a stone construction dating from the 18th century. To the south lies a 15th- or early 16th-century building of cut stone and flint included the refectory on the ground floor and a dormitory with cells on the first floor, which has preserved 16th-century carpentry work of chestnut wood. On the east side, in the extension of the south transept of the abbey church, the old chapter room is a vaulted room dating back to the 11th century. Following it, on the same side, is the old refectory, a vast 13th-century Gothic hall. The ribbed vaults rest along the walls on applied columns with hooked capitals and, in the centre, on a row of round columns.

In the background, behind the apse of the church, the 15th-century remains of the abbey's former infirmary are still visible. In 1811, the town set up a local secondary school there, which later became an Ecole primaire supérieure et professionnelle from 1856 to 1941, then a college from 1941 to 1954 and finally a lycée annexe until 1969.

== Coat of arms of the abbey ==
Gules, a long cross or on a mount argent.

== List of abbesses ==
- 1035-1065: Beatrice of Normandy
- 1065-1116: Elisabeth I
- 1117-1152: Almodie
- 1152-1192: Matilda FitzRoy
- 1192-1203: Adeline
- 1203-1232: Alix de Walterville
- 1232-1236: Marguerite de Bargines
- 1236-1256: Marguerite de Guerres-en-Brie
- 1256-1258: Julienne
- 1258-1259: Alix II
- 1259-1275: Agnès I
- 1275-1302: Philippa
- 1302-1320: Mathilde de Mortemer
- 1320-1330: Elisabeth II
- 1330-1355: Yolande des Préaux
- 1355-1372: Jeanne I
- 1372-1389: Marguerite de La Rivière
- 1389-1397: Marie de Noyers
- 1398-1403: Isabelle Ponchin
- 1403-1416: Catherine de Hardouville
- 1416-1417: Isabelle de Boscherville
- 1417-1445: Durande Féré, former prioress of Saint-Paul de Rouen
- 1445-1469: Guillemette de Tournebu
- 1469-1503: Agnès Le Lièvre
- 1503-1507: Jeanne de Chambray
- 1507-1511: Isabelle Le Clerc
- 1511-1528: Jeanne Mustel
- 1528-1536: Catherine d'Albret, daughter of King John III of Navarre. She was a nun from the Abbey of Sainte-Madeleine d'Orléans
- 1536-1552: Claire du Motier de Lafayette
- 1552-1589: Guillemette de la Platière, prioress of Marsac, niece of the preceding and sister of Imbert de La Plâtière, Marshal of France
- 1589-1593: Barbe Cavelier
- 1593-1617: Louise de L'Hospital de Vitry, reformer of the abbey
- 1617-1644: Anne de L'Hospital de Vitry, sister of François de L'Hospital, niece of the preceding
- 1644-1661: Louise de L'Hospital de Vitry, niece of the preceding
- 1661-1682: Éléonore-Charlotte Gigault de Bellefonds
- 1682-1745: Laure-Madeleine Cadot de Sébeville.

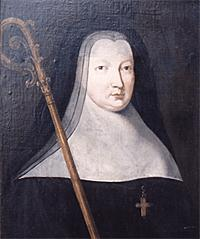
Laure-Madeleine Cadot de Sébeville

- 1745-1763: Madeleine-Éléonore Gigault de Bellefonds, sister of Jacques Bonne-Gigault de Bellefonds, Archbishop of Paris
- 1763-1778: Germaine de Conty d'Hargicourt
- 1778-1792: Marie Anne de Grossolles de Flamarens
