= List of earls in the reign of Henry I of England =

The following individuals were Earls during the reign of King Henry I of England who reigned from 1100 to 1135.

The period of tenure as Earl is given after the name and title of each individual, including any period of minority.

Earl of Buckingham

Walter Giffard, 1st Earl of Buckingham (1097–1102)

Walter Giffard, 2nd Earl of Buckingham (1102–1164)

Earl of Chester (Second Creation)

Hugh d'Avranches, Earl of Chester (1071–1101)

Richard d'Avranches, 2nd Earl of Chester (1101–1120)

Ranulf le Meschin, 3rd Earl of Chester (1120–1129)

Ranulf de Gernon, 4th Earl of Chester (1129–1153)

Earl of Gloucester

Robert, 1st Earl of Gloucester (1122–1147)

Earl of Huntingdon (Huntingdon-Northampton)

Simon I de Senlis, Earl of Huntingdon-Northampton (1090–1113)

David I of Scotland, Earl of Huntingdon-Northampton (1113–1136)

Earl of Leicester

Robert de Beaumont, 1st Earl of Leicester (1107–1118)

Robert de Beaumont, 2nd Earl of Leicester (1118–1168)

Earl of Shrewsbury

Robert of Bellême, 3rd Earl of Shrewsbury (1098–1102)

Earl of Surrey

William de Warenne, 2nd Earl of Surrey (1088–1101) (1103–1138)

Earl of Warwick

Henry de Beaumont, 1st Earl of Warwick (1088–1119)

Roger de Beaumont, 2nd Earl of Warwick (1119–1153)

== Sources ==
Ellis, Geoffrey. (1963) Earldoms in Fee: A Study in Peerage Law and History. London: The Saint Catherine Press, Limited.
