= Rouen Riot =

Riot in 1090 Normandy

Date	3 November 1090
Location	Rouen, Normandy
Result	Victory of ducal faction

Belligerents
Duchy of Normandy; Pro ducal Calloenses	Kingdom of England; Pilatenses (anti-ducal citizens)

Commanders and leaders
Robert Curthose; Henry Beauclerc; Gilbert de L'Aigle	Conan Pilatus (POW); Reginald de Warenne

The Rouen Riot was the failed attempt by forces loyal to English king William Rufus to take control of Rouen, the capital of the duke of Normandy and William's brother, Robert Curthose, in November 1090.

== Background ==
After the failed attempt of Robert to take the English crown from his brother William Rufus, the latter started pulling major Norman nobles who held land in both England and Normandy to his side and started garrisoning troops in castles belonging to these nobles. Rufus also succeeded in exploiting existing rivalries among the merchants of Rouen, the capital of the duchy of Normandy and winning one party over with bribes. The leader of the anti-ducal party was Conan, son of Gilbert Pilatus, after which the anti-ducal party was called Pilatenses. Conan Pilatus was one of the wealthiest and influential burghers of the city and maintained a retinue of men-at-arms. The chroniclers Orderic Vitalis and William of Malmesbury, whose writing often reflect partisanship for the aristocracy, condemned Conan for this perceived unrightful position of a commoner and for committing treason against the rightful lord. Conan accepted the bribes and agreed to turn over the city and the duke to William Rufus. The fall of Rouen to Rufus would not only deny Robert access to its port and economic resources, his reputation would have also suffered a serious blow.

In late October 1090, Conan thought most of Rouen's citizens behind him and victory certain, so that he sent messengers to Rufus' garrisons to immediately join his forces in Rouen. Duke Robert received information of the plot by some unknown means and summoned several of his loyal barons to Rouen, including William of Evreux, his nephew William of Breteuil and Gilbert of L'Aigle. Robert also summoned Robert of Belleme and his own brother Henry Beauclerc, both of whom had been imprisoned by Robert the year prior.

== The riot ==
Henry arrived in Rouen around the beginning of November and the riot begun in the morning of 3 November 1090, a Sunday. The catalyst was the arrival of a ducal contingent under the leadership of Gilbert of L'Aigle from the south and 300 royalist troops under Reginald of Warrene from the West. Conan ordered thus to open the western gate, known as Cauchoise gate, to Reginald while resisting Gilbert's men, who were coming up the Seine bridge, at the southern Gate. Apart from his own men, Conan was aided by several soldiers in the pay of Rufus who had infiltrated the city prior. They were opposed by a minority of citizens who supported Robert.

The general chaos was increased by the sally of Robert and Henry from the castle who attacked the rebels in the city. Though the duke demonstrated his personal bravery and ability as a leader in crisis, his retainers feared that he might be wounded or die in the confused street fighting and urged him to retire to a place of safety. Robert took their advice and withdrew first to the suburb of Malpalu from where he took a boat over the Seine to Emendreville to join his counsellor William of Arques, monk of Molesme. The duke and William then took refuge at the church of Notre Dame du Pré, an unfinished Bec priory that Robert later rewarded with a tithe from his hunting park outside Rouen.

Led by Gilbert and Henry, the citizens loyal to Robert defeated the revolt, capturing several leaders of the revolt, including Conan.

== Aftermath ==
As the insurrection collapsed, some of the ducal forces such as Robert of Belleme and William of Breteui took the opportunity to loot and take citizens captive for ransom. As such, a certain William fitzAngers is reported to have bought his freedom by paying £3,000 for his freedom.

Though Robert was content to imprison Conan, his brother Henry led Conan to the top of the tower of Rouen from where they could see the whole city and its surrounding region. Conan admitted his guilt and pleaded for mercy, but Henry hurled Conan down, without giving Conan even the possibility to confess. According to Orderic, Conan's body was then tied to a horse's tail and dragged through the streets as a warning for traitors. The place was known thereafter as "Conan's Leap". While scholars have often taken Henry to be a fierce and merciless ruler for acts like these, these treatments mostly affected the common people whereas the nobility often experience Henry's clementia (mercy).

William Rufus gained little from the venture and an Anglo-Saxon chronicler complains of the unjust gelds the king imposed England, likely as a result.

== Bibliography ==
- Aird, William M. (2011). Robert Curthose, Duke of Normandy: C. 1050-1134. Boydell Press. ISBN 978-1-84383-660-5.
- Barlow, Frank (1 October 2008). William Rufus. Yale University Press. ISBN 978-0-300-14771-1.
- Beyer, Katrin (2014). "Wit and Irony - Rhetorical Strategies and their Performance". In Steckel, Sita; Gaul, Niels; Grünbart, Michael (eds.). Networks of Learning: Perspectives on Scholars in Byzantine East and Latin West, C. 1000-1200. LIT Verlag Münster. ISBN 978-3-643-90457-7.
- Hollister, Warren (January 1996). "The Rouen riot and Conan's leap". Peritia. 10: 341–350. doi:10.1484/J.Peri.3.16.
- Hollister, C. Warren (1 October 2008). Henry I. Yale University Press. ISBN 978-0-300-14372-0.
