= Matilda FitzRoy, Abbess of Montivilliers =

Illegitimate daughter of Henry I of England

Matilda FitzRoy
- Father: Henry I of England

Maud, Abbess of Montivilliers, was a natural daughter of Henry I of England by an unknown mistress. She is not to be confused with Isabel, another illegitimate daughter of Henry I by his mistress Isabel de Beaumont (c. 1102 – c. 1172), herself a sister of Robert de Beaumont, 2nd Earl of Leicester.

Maud (or Mathilda) was a half-sister of the Empress Matilda, who agreed to work with her. She may have valued her company and advice.

Matilda became the abbess of the Montivilliers Abbey, and for that reason is best known as Maud of Montivilliers.
