= Henry I of England =

King of England from 1100 to 1135

Henry I
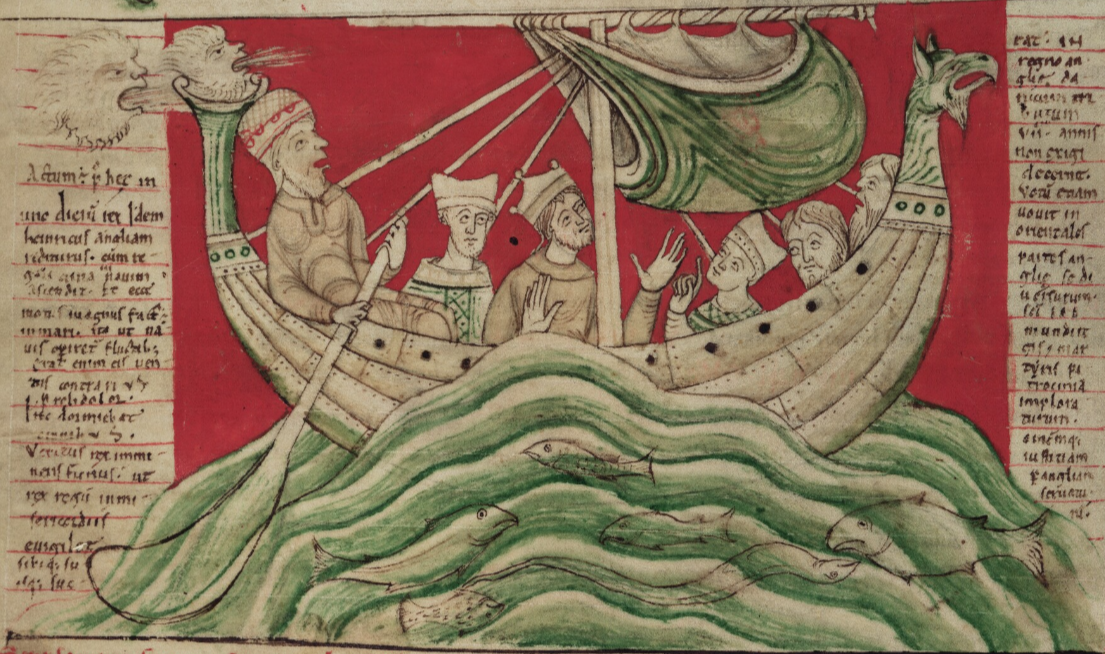
- Miniature from John of Worcester's Chronicon ex Chronicis, c. 1118–1140.

King of England
- Reign: 1100–1135
- Coronation: 5 August 1100
- Predecessor: William II
- Successor: Stephen

Duke of Normandy
- Reign: 1106 – 1 December 1135
- Predecessor: Robert Curthose
- Successor: Stephen
- Born: c. 1068 possibly Selby, Yorkshire, England
- Died: 1 December 1135 (aged 66–67); Saint-Denis-en-Lyons, Normandy, France
- Burial: Reading Abbey
- Spouses: Matilda of Scotland (m. 1100; died 1118) Adeliza of Louvain (m. 1121)
- Issue more ...: Matilda, Holy Roman Empress; William Adelin, Duke of Normandy; Illegitimate: Robert, 1st Earl of Gloucester; Aline, Lady of Montmorency; Juliane de Fontevrault; Matilda, Countess of Perche; Richard of Lincoln; Sybilla, Queen of Scots; Reginald, 1st Earl of Cornwall; Matilda, Duchess of Brittany; Robert, Lord of Okehampton; Matilda, Abbess of Montvilliers; Henry FitzRoy; Fulk FitzRoy; Gilbert FitzRoy
- House: Normandy
- Father: William the Conqueror
- Mother: Matilda of Flanders

Henry I (c. 1068 – 1 December 1135), also known as Henry Beauclerc, was King of England from 1100 to his death in 1135. He was the fourth son of William the Conqueror and was educated in Latin and the liberal arts. On William's death in 1087, Henry's elder brothers Robert Curthose and William Rufus inherited Normandy and England, respectively, thereby leaving Henry landless. He subsequently purchased the County of Cotentin in western Normandy from Robert, but his brothers deposed him in 1091. He gradually rebuilt his power base in the Cotentin and allied himself with William Rufus against Robert.

When William Rufus died in a hunting accident, Henry seized the English throne ahead of Robert, promising at his coronation to correct many of William's less popular policies. He married Matilda of Scotland and they had two surviving children, Empress Matilda and William Adelin. Robert disputed Henry's control of England and invaded from Normandy in 1101. The ensuing military campaign ended in a negotiated settlement that confirmed Henry as king. The peace was short-lived, however, and Henry invaded the Duchy of Normandy in 1105 and 1106, finally defeating Robert at the Battle of Tinchebray. Henry kept Robert imprisoned for the rest of Robert's life. Henry's control of Normandy was subsequently challenged by Louis VI of France, Baldwin VII of Flanders and Fulk V of Anjou, who promoted the rival claims of Robert's son, William Clito, and supported a major rebellion in the Duchy between 1116 and 1119. Following Henry's victory at the Battle of Brémule, a favourable peace settlement was agreed with Louis in 1120.

Considered by contemporaries to be a harsh but effective ruler, Henry skilfully manipulated the barons in England and Normandy. In England, he drew on the existing Anglo-Saxon system of justice, local government and taxation, but also strengthened it with more institutions such as the royal exchequer and itinerant justices. Many of the officials who ran Henry's system were "new men" of obscure backgrounds, rather than from families of high status, who rose through the ranks as administrators. Henry encouraged ecclesiastical reform but became embroiled in a serious dispute in 1101 with Archbishop Anselm of Canterbury, which was resolved through a compromise solution in 1105. He supported the Cluniac order and played a major role in the selection of the senior clergy in England and Normandy.

Henry's son William drowned in the White Ship disaster of 1120, throwing the royal succession into doubt. Henry took a second wife, Adeliza of Louvain, in the hope of having another son, but their marriage was childless. In response to this, he declared his daughter Matilda his heir and married her to Geoffrey of Anjou. The relationship between Henry and the couple became strained, and fighting broke out along the border with Anjou. Henry died on 1 December 1135 after a week of illness. Despite his plans for Matilda, the King was succeeded by his nephew Stephen of Blois, resulting in a period of civil war known as the Anarchy.

== Early life, 1068–1099 ==
=== Childhood and appearance, 1068–1086 ===
Henry was probably born in England in 1068, in either the summer or the last weeks of the year, possibly in the town of Selby in Yorkshire. (Note: The dating of Henry's birth depends on comparing chronicler accounts and the travels of his parents William and Matilda; these give only limited periods in which Henry could have been conceived and born. Historian Warren Hollister prefers the summer of 1068, Judith Green the end of the year, although it is just possible that Henry could have been born in early 1069. The possible birthplace of Selby is based upon a local tradition.) His father was William the Conqueror, the Duke of Normandy who had invaded England in 1066 to become the King of England, establishing lands stretching into Wales. The invasion had created an Anglo-Norman ruling class, many with estates on both sides of the English Channel. These Anglo-Norman barons typically had close links to the Kingdom of France, which was then a loose collection of counties and smaller polities, only nominally under control of the king. Henry's mother, Matilda of Flanders, was the granddaughter of King Robert II of France, and she probably named Henry after her uncle Henry I of France.

Henry was the youngest of William and Matilda's four sons. Physically he resembled his older brothers Robert Curthose, Richard and William Rufus, being, as historian David Carpenter describes, "short, stocky and barrel-chested," with black hair. As a result of their age differences and Richard's early death, Henry would have probably seen relatively little of his older brothers. He probably knew his sister Adela well, as the two were close in age. There is little documentary evidence for his early years; historians Warren Hollister and Kathleen Thompson suggest he was brought up predominantly in England, while Judith Green argues he was initially brought up in the Duchy. (Note: The chronicler Orderic Vitalis describes a colourful quarrel that is said to have occurred between Henry and his brothers Robert and William Rufus in the town of l'Aigle; modern historians, including Judith Green and Warren Hollister, are inclined to doubt the veracity of the story.) He was probably educated by the Church, possibly by Bishop Osmund, the King's chancellor, at Salisbury Cathedral; it is uncertain if this indicated an intent by his parents for Henry to become a member of the clergy. (Note: Historian Warren Hollister doubts that Henry was ever destined for the clergy; Judith Green is less certain.) It is also uncertain how far Henry's education extended, but he was probably able to read Latin and had some background in the liberal arts. He was given military training by an instructor called Robert Achard, and Henry was knighted by his father on 24 May 1086.

=== Inheritance, 1087–1088 ===
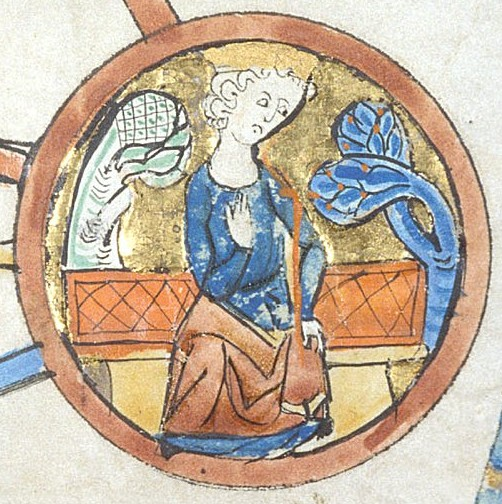
13th-century depiction of Henry

In 1087, William was fatally injured during a campaign in the Vexin. Henry joined his dying father near Rouen in September, where the King partitioned his possessions among his sons. The rules of succession in western Europe at the time were uncertain; in some parts of France, primogeniture, in which the eldest son would inherit a title, was growing in popularity. In other parts of Europe, including Normandy and England, the tradition was for lands to be divided, with the eldest son taking patrimonial lands – usually considered to be the most valuable – and younger sons given smaller, or more recently acquired, partitions or estates.

In dividing his lands, William appears to have followed the Norman tradition, distinguishing between Normandy, which he had inherited, and England, which he had acquired through war. William's second son, Richard, had died in a hunting accident, leaving Henry and his two brothers to inherit William's estate. Robert, the eldest, despite being in armed rebellion against his father at the time of his death, received Normandy. England was given to William Rufus, who was in favour with the dying king. Henry was given a large sum of money, usually reported as £5,000, with the expectation that he would also be given his mother's modest set of lands in Buckinghamshire and Gloucestershire. (Note: Chroniclers varied in reporting the sum as either £2,000 or £5,000, although £5,000 is the more commonly cited figure among later historians.) William's funeral at Caen was marred by angry complaints from a local man, and Henry may have been responsible for resolving the dispute by buying off the protester with silver.

Robert returned to Normandy, expecting to have been given both the Duchy and England, to find that William Rufus had crossed the Channel and been crowned king. The two brothers disagreed fundamentally over the inheritance, and Robert soon began to plan an invasion of England to seize the kingdom, helped by a rebellion by some of the leading nobles against William Rufus. Henry remained in Normandy and took up a role within Robert's court, possibly either because he was unwilling to side openly with William Rufus, or because Robert might have taken the opportunity to confiscate Henry's inherited money if he had tried to leave. (Note: £5,000 would have formed around 1.5 million silver pennies, a difficult sum to move easily out of the Duchy if opposed.) William Rufus sequestered Henry's new estates in England, leaving Henry landless.

In 1088, Robert's plans for the invasion of England began to falter, and he turned to Henry, proposing that his brother lend him some of his inheritance, which Henry refused. Henry and Robert then came to an alternative arrangement, in which Robert would make Henry the count of western Normandy, in exchange for £3,000. (Note: Western Normandy had originally been intended for Henry's late brother Richard and was suitably remote from the capital in Rouen.) Henry's lands were a new countship created by a delegation of the ducal authority in the Cotentin, but it extended across the Avranchin, with control over the bishoprics of both. This also gave Henry influence over two major Norman leaders, Hugh d'Avranches and Richard de Redvers, and the abbey of Mont Saint-Michel, whose lands spread out further across the Duchy. Robert's invasion force failed to leave Normandy, leaving William Rufus secure in England.

=== Count of the Cotentin, 1088–90 ===
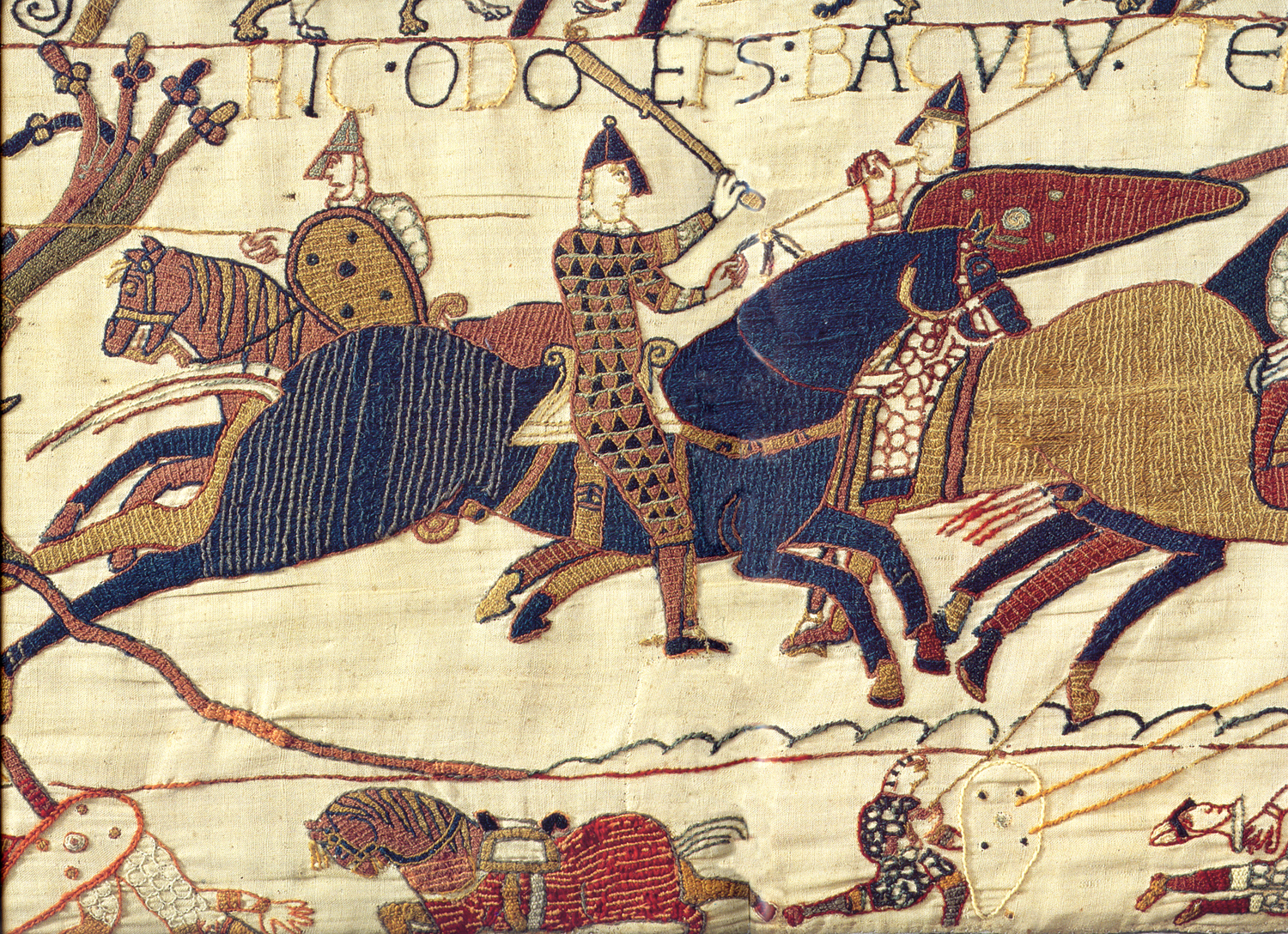
Depiction of Bishop Odo (wielding club at centre) who imprisoned Henry from 1088 to 1089. From the Bayeux Tapestry.

Henry quickly established himself as count, building up a network of followers from western Normandy and eastern Brittany, whom the historian John Le Patourel has characterised as "Henry's gang". His early supporters included Roger of Mandeville, Richard of Redvers, Richard d'Avranches and Robert Fitzhamon, along with the churchman Roger of Salisbury. Robert attempted to go back on his deal with Henry and re-appropriate the county, but Henry's grip was already sufficiently firm to prevent this. Robert's rule of the duchy was chaotic, and parts of Henry's lands became almost independent of central control from Rouen.

During this period, neither King William nor Duke Robert seems to have trusted Henry. Waiting until the rebellion against William was safely over, Henry returned to England in July 1088. He met with the King but was unable to persuade him to grant him their mother's estates, and travelled back to Normandy in the autumn. While he had been away, however, Odo, Bishop of Bayeux, who regarded Henry as a potential competitor, had convinced Robert that Henry was conspiring against the duke with William. On landing, Odo seized Henry and imprisoned him in Neuilly-la-Forêt, and Robert took back the county of the Cotentin. Henry was held there over the winter, but in the spring of 1089 the senior elements of the Normandy nobility prevailed upon Robert to release him.

Although no longer formally the Count of Cotentin, Henry continued to control the west of Normandy. The struggle between his brothers continued. William continued to put down resistance to his rule in England, but began to build a series of alliances against Robert with barons in Normandy and neighbouring Ponthieu. Robert allied himself with Philip I of France. In late 1090 William encouraged Conan Pilatus, a powerful burgher in Rouen, to rebel against Robert; Conan was supported by most of Rouen and made appeals to the neighbouring ducal garrisons to switch allegiance as well.

Robert issued an appeal for help to his barons, and Henry was the first to arrive in Rouen in November. Violence broke out, leading to savage, confused street fighting as both sides attempted to take control of the city. Robert and Henry left the castle to join the battle, but Robert then retreated, leaving Henry to continue the fighting. The battle turned in favour of the ducal forces and Henry took Conan prisoner. Henry was angry that Conan had turned against his feudal lord. He had him taken to the top of Rouen Castle and then, despite Conan's offers to pay a huge ransom, threw him off the top of the castle to his death. Contemporaries considered Henry to have acted appropriately in making an example of Conan, and Henry became famous for his exploits in the battle.

=== Fall and rise, 1091–1099 ===
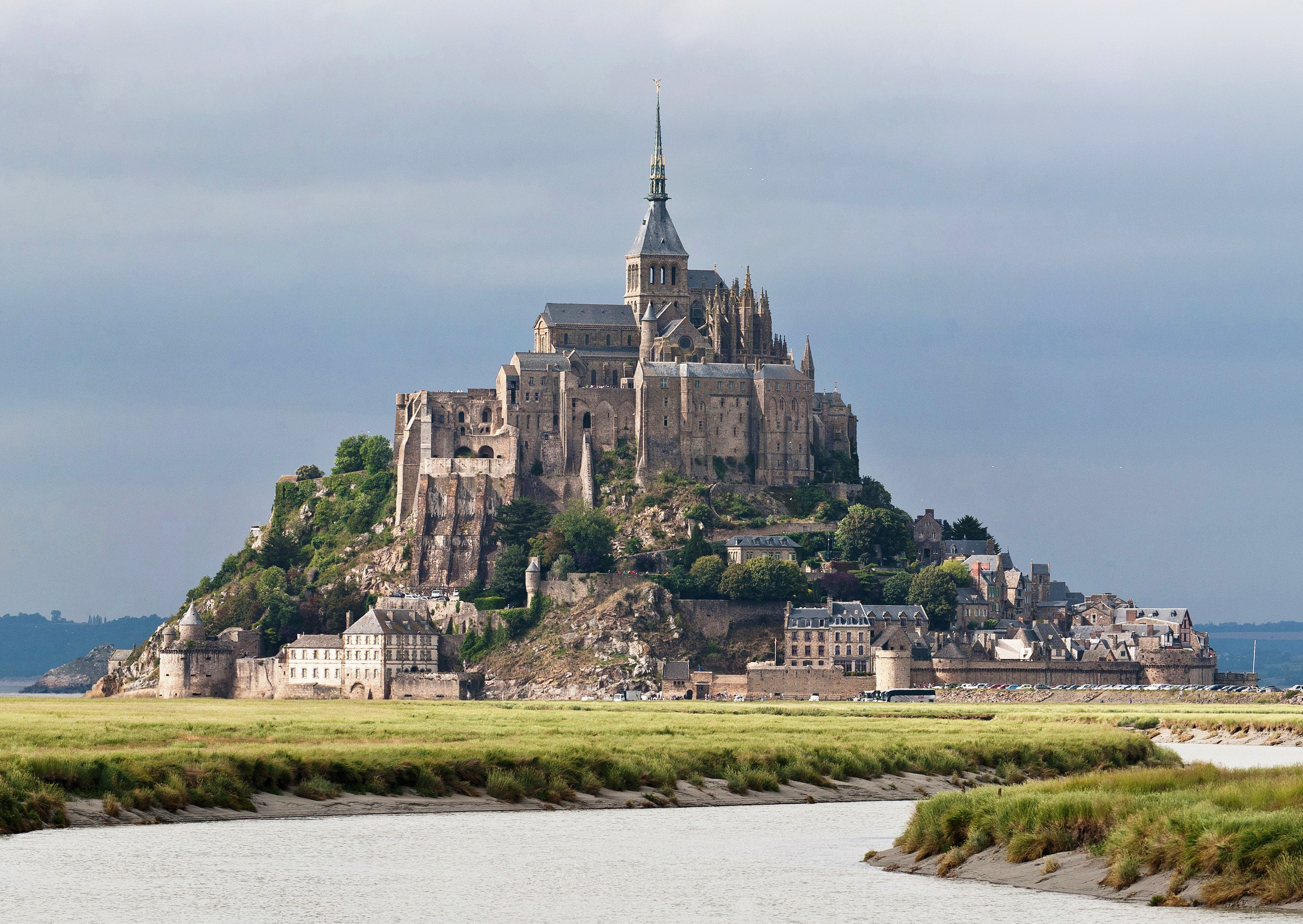
Mont Saint-Michel in Normandy, site of the 1091 siege

In the aftermath, Robert forced Henry to leave Rouen, probably because Henry's role in the fighting had been more prominent than his own, and possibly because Henry had asked to be formally reinstated as the count of the Cotentin. In early 1091, William invaded Normandy with a sufficiently large army to bring Robert to the negotiating table. The two brothers signed a treaty at Rouen, granting William a range of lands and castles in Normandy. In return, William promised to support Robert's attempts to regain control of the neighbouring county of Maine, once under Norman control, and help in regaining control over the duchy, including Henry's lands. They nominated each other as heirs to England and Normandy, excluding Henry from any succession while either one of them lived.

War now broke out between Henry and his brothers. Henry mobilised a mercenary army in the west of Normandy, but as William and Robert's forces advanced, his network of baronial support melted away. Henry focused his remaining forces at Mont Saint-Michel, where he was besieged, probably in March 1091. The site was easy to defend, but lacked fresh water. The chronicler William of Malmesbury suggested that when Henry's water ran short, Robert allowed his brother fresh supplies, leading to remonstrations between Robert and William Rufus. The events of the final days of the siege are unclear: the besiegers had begun to argue about the future strategy for the campaign, but Henry then abandoned Mont Saint-Michel, probably as part of a negotiated surrender. (Note: Chroniclers vary in their description of the length of the siege, suggesting either a duration of 15 days and six weeks. Warren Hollister prefers six weeks; Judith Green, 15 days.) He left for Brittany and crossed over into France.

Henry's next steps are not well documented; one chronicler, Orderic Vitalis, suggests that he travelled in the French Vexin, along the Normandy border, for over a year with a small band of followers. By the end of the year, Robert and William had fallen out once again, and the Treaty of Rouen had been abandoned. In 1092, Henry and his followers seized the Normandy town of Domfront. Domfront had previously been controlled by Robert of Bellême, but the inhabitants disliked his rule and invited Henry to take over the town, which he did in a bloodless coup. Over the next two years, Henry re-established his network of supporters across western Normandy, forming what Judith Green terms a "court in waiting". By 1094, he was allocating lands and castles to his followers as if he were the Duke of Normandy. William began to support Henry with money, encouraging his campaign against Robert, and Henry used some of this to construct a substantial castle at Domfront.

William crossed into Normandy to take the war to Robert in 1094, and when progress stalled, called upon Henry for assistance. Henry responded, but travelled to London instead of joining the main campaign further east in Normandy, possibly at the request of William, who in any event abandoned the campaign and returned to England. (Note: Henry's decision not to join the main campaign may have been because Robert's forces were sufficiently strong to prevent him joining William at Eu.) Over the next few years, Henry appears to have strengthened his power base in western Normandy, visiting England occasionally to attend William's court. In 1095 Pope Urban II called the First Crusade, encouraging knights from across Europe to join. Robert joined the Crusade, borrowing money from William to do so, and granting the King temporary custody of his part of the Duchy in exchange. The King appeared confident of regaining the remainder of Normandy from Robert, and Henry appeared ever closer to William. They campaigned together in the Norman Vexin between 1097 and 1098.

== Early reign, 1100–1106 ==
=== Taking the throne, 1100 ===
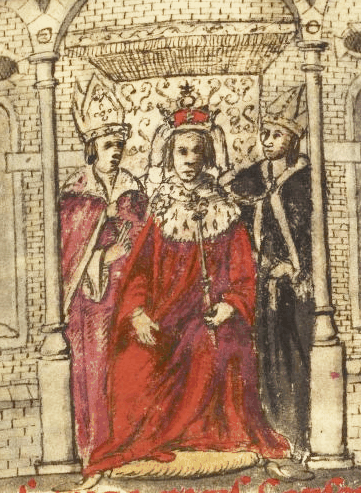
A 17th-century manuscript drawing of Henry's coronation.

On the afternoon of 2 August 1100, King William went hunting in the New Forest, accompanied by a team of huntsmen and Norman nobility, including Henry. An arrow, possibly shot by the baron Walter Tirel, hit and killed William. Many conspiracy theories have been put forward suggesting that the King was killed deliberately; most modern historians reject these, as hunting was a risky activity and such accidents were common. (Note: David Carpenter regards William Rufus's death as "almost certainly an accident"; Warren Hollister considers "by far the likeliest explanation for the killing is simply ... that it was a hunting accident"; Judith Green argues that "on balance it seems most likely that Rufus died because of an accident". Emma Mason is more suspicious, giving credence to the theory that William Rufus was murdered, either by Henry or by agents of the French king. The minority view was also held by Austin Poole, who considered Henry a "usurper"; writing earlier in the 20th century, he argued that the facts "look ugly" – in particular Tirel's departure from the scene, Henry's potential motive and apparent disregard for his brother – and "seem to suggest a plot.") Chaos broke out, and Tirel fled the scene for France, either because he had shot the fatal arrow, or because he had been incorrectly accused and feared that he would be made a scapegoat for the King's death.

Henry rode to Winchester, where an argument ensued as to who now had the best claim to the throne. William of Breteuil championed the rights of Robert, who was still abroad, returning from the Crusade, and to whom Henry and the barons had given homage in previous years. Henry argued that, unlike Robert, he had been born to a reigning king and queen, thereby giving him a claim under the right of porphyrogeniture. Tempers flared, but Henry, supported by Henry de Beaumont and Robert of Meulan, held sway and persuaded the barons to follow him. He occupied Winchester Castle and seized the royal treasury.

Henry was hastily crowned king in Westminster Abbey on 5 August by Maurice, the bishop of London, as Anselm, the archbishop of Canterbury, had been exiled by William Rufus, and Thomas, the archbishop of York, was in the north of England at Ripon. In accordance with English tradition and in a bid to legitimise his rule, Henry issued a coronation charter laying out various commitments. The new king presented himself as having restored order to a trouble-torn country. He announced that he would abandon William's policies towards the Church, which had been seen as oppressive by the clergy; he promised to prevent royal abuses of the barons' property rights, and assured a return to the gentler customs of Edward the Confessor; he asserted that he would "establish a firm peace" across England and ordered "that this peace shall henceforth be kept".

As well as his existing circle of supporters, many of whom were richly rewarded with new lands, Henry quickly co-opted many of the existing administration into his new royal household. His brother's chancellor, William Giffard, was made the bishop of Winchester, and the prominent sheriffs Urse d'Abetot, Haimo Dapifer and Robert Fitzhamon continued to play a senior role in government. By contrast, the unpopular Ranulf Flambard, the bishop of Durham and a key member of the previous regime, was imprisoned in the Tower of London and charged with corruption. The late king had left many Church positions unfilled, and Henry set about nominating candidates to these, in an effort to build further support for his new government. The appointments needed to be consecrated, and Henry wrote to Anselm, apologising for having been crowned while the archbishop was still in France and asking him to return at once.

=== Marriage to Matilda, 1100 ===
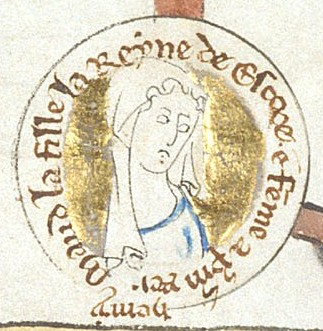
Henry's first wife, Matilda of Scotland

On 11 November 1100 Henry married Matilda, the daughter of Malcolm III of Scotland, in Westminster Abbey. Henry was now around 31 years old, but late marriages for noblemen were not unusual in the 11th century. The pair had probably first met earlier the previous decade, possibly being introduced through Bishop Osmund of Salisbury. Historian Warren Hollister argues that Henry and Matilda were emotionally close, but their union was also certainly politically motivated. (Note: The chroniclers Eadmer, Malmesbury and Orderic describe the couple as close, with Eadmer noting that they were in love.) Matilda had originally been named Edith, an Anglo-Saxon name, and was a member of the West Saxon royal family, being the niece of Edgar the Ætheling, the great-granddaughter of Edmund Ironside and a descendant of Alfred the Great. For Henry, marrying Matilda gave his reign increased legitimacy, and for Matilda, an ambitious woman, it was an opportunity for high status and power in England.

Matilda had been educated in a sequence of convents and may well have taken the vows to formally become a nun, which formed an obstacle to the marriage progressing. She did not wish to be a nun and appealed to Anselm for permission to marry Henry, and the Archbishop established a council at Lambeth Palace to judge the issue. Despite some dissenting voices, the council concluded that although Matilda had lived in a convent, she had not actually become a nun and was therefore free to marry, a judgement that Anselm then affirmed, allowing the marriage to proceed. (Note: Anselm was criticised in some quarters for permitting the royal marriage to proceed.) Matilda proved an effective queen for Henry, acting as a regent in England on occasion, addressing and presiding over councils, and extensively supporting the arts. The couple soon had two children, Matilda, born in 1102, and William Adelin, born in 1103; it is possible that they also had a second son, Richard, who died young. (Note: The only chronicler to suggest a second son is Gervase of Canterbury.) Following the birth of these children, the Queen preferred to remain based in Westminster while the King travelled across England and Normandy, either for religious reasons or because she enjoyed being involved in the machinery of royal governance.

Henry had a considerable sexual appetite and enjoyed a substantial number of sexual partners, resulting in many illegitimate children, at least nine sons and 13 daughters, many of whom he appears to have recognised and supported. It was normal for unmarried Anglo-Norman noblemen to have sexual relations with prostitutes and local women, and kings were also expected to have mistresses. (Note: Bisexuality was also common among this social group, but there is no evidence to suggest that Henry had male partners.) Some of these relationships occurred before Henry was married, but many others took place after his marriage to Matilda. Henry had a wide range of mistresses from a range of backgrounds, and the relationships appear to have been conducted relatively openly. He may have chosen some of his noble mistresses for political purposes, but the evidence to support this theory is limited.

=== Treaty of Alton, 1101–1102 ===
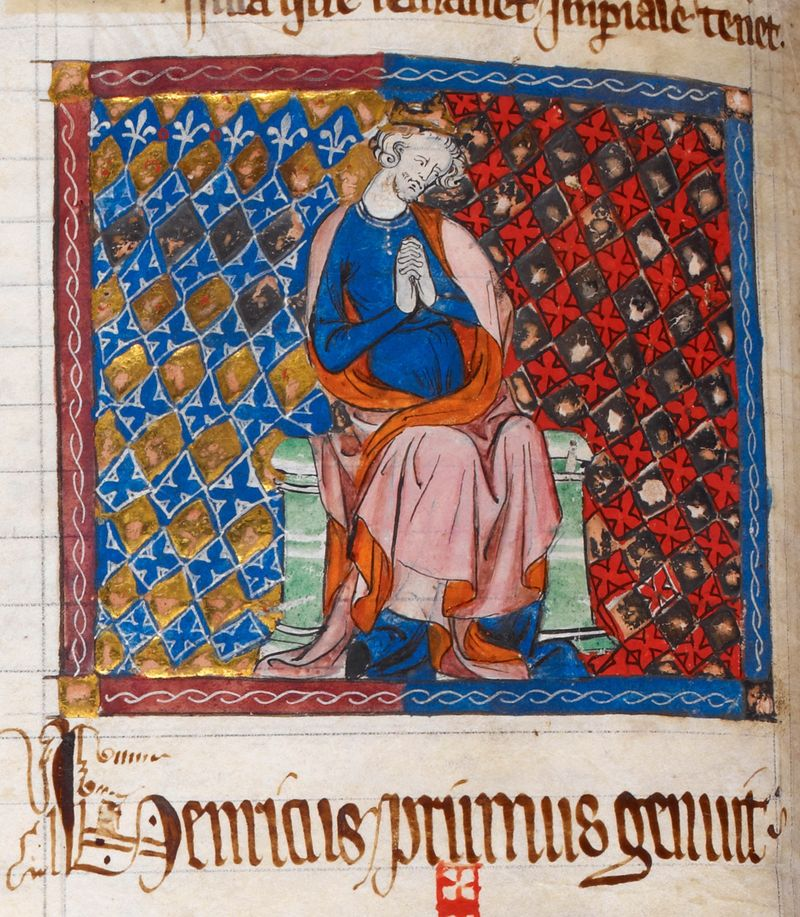
Early 14th-century depiction of Henry

By early 1101, Henry's new regime was established and functioning, but many of the Anglo-Norman elite still supported his brother Robert, or would be prepared to switch sides if Robert appeared likely to gain power in England. In February, Flambard escaped from the Tower of London and crossed the Channel to Normandy, where he injected fresh direction and energy to Robert's attempts to mobilise an invasion force. By July, Robert had formed an army and a fleet, ready to move against Henry in England. Raising the stakes in the conflict, Henry seized Flambard's lands and, with the support of Anselm, Flambard was removed from his position as bishop. The King held court in April and June, where the nobility renewed their oaths of allegiance to him, but their support still appeared partial and shaky.

With the invasion imminent, Henry mobilised his forces and fleet outside Pevensey, close to Robert's anticipated landing site, training some of them personally in how to counter cavalry charges. Despite English levies and knights owing military service to the Church arriving in considerable numbers, many of his barons did not appear. Anselm intervened with some of the doubters, emphasising the religious importance of their loyalty to Henry. Robert unexpectedly landed further up the coast at Portsmouth on 20 July with a modest force of a few hundred men, but these were quickly joined by many of the barons in England. Instead of marching into nearby Winchester and seizing Henry's treasury, Robert paused, giving Henry time to march west and intercept the invasion force.

The two armies met at Alton, Hampshire, where peace negotiations began, possibly initiated by either Henry or Robert, and probably supported by Flambard. The brothers then agreed to the Treaty of Alton, under which Robert released Henry from his oath of homage and recognised him as king; Henry renounced his claims on western Normandy, except for Domfront, and agreed to pay Robert £2,000 a year for life; if either brother died without a male heir, the other would inherit his lands; the barons whose lands had been seized by either the King or the Duke for supporting his rival would have them returned, and Flambard would be reinstated as bishop; the two brothers would campaign together to defend their territories in Normandy. (Note: Most chroniclers reported this sum as 3,000 marks, equivalent to £2,000, but Orderic recorded the agreed amount as £3,000.) Robert remained in England for a few months more with Henry before returning to Normandy.

Despite the treaty, Henry set about inflicting severe penalties on the barons who had stood against him during the invasion. William de Warenne, the Earl of Surrey, was accused of fresh crimes, which were not covered by the Alton amnesty, and was banished from England. In 1102 Henry then turned against Robert of Bellême and his brothers, the most powerful of the barons, accusing him of 45 different offences. Robert escaped and took up arms against Henry. Henry besieged Robert's castles at Arundel, Tickhill and Shrewsbury, pushing down into the south-west to attack Bridgnorth. His power base in England broken, Robert accepted Henry's offer of banishment and left the country for Normandy.

=== Conquest of Normandy, 1103–1106 ===
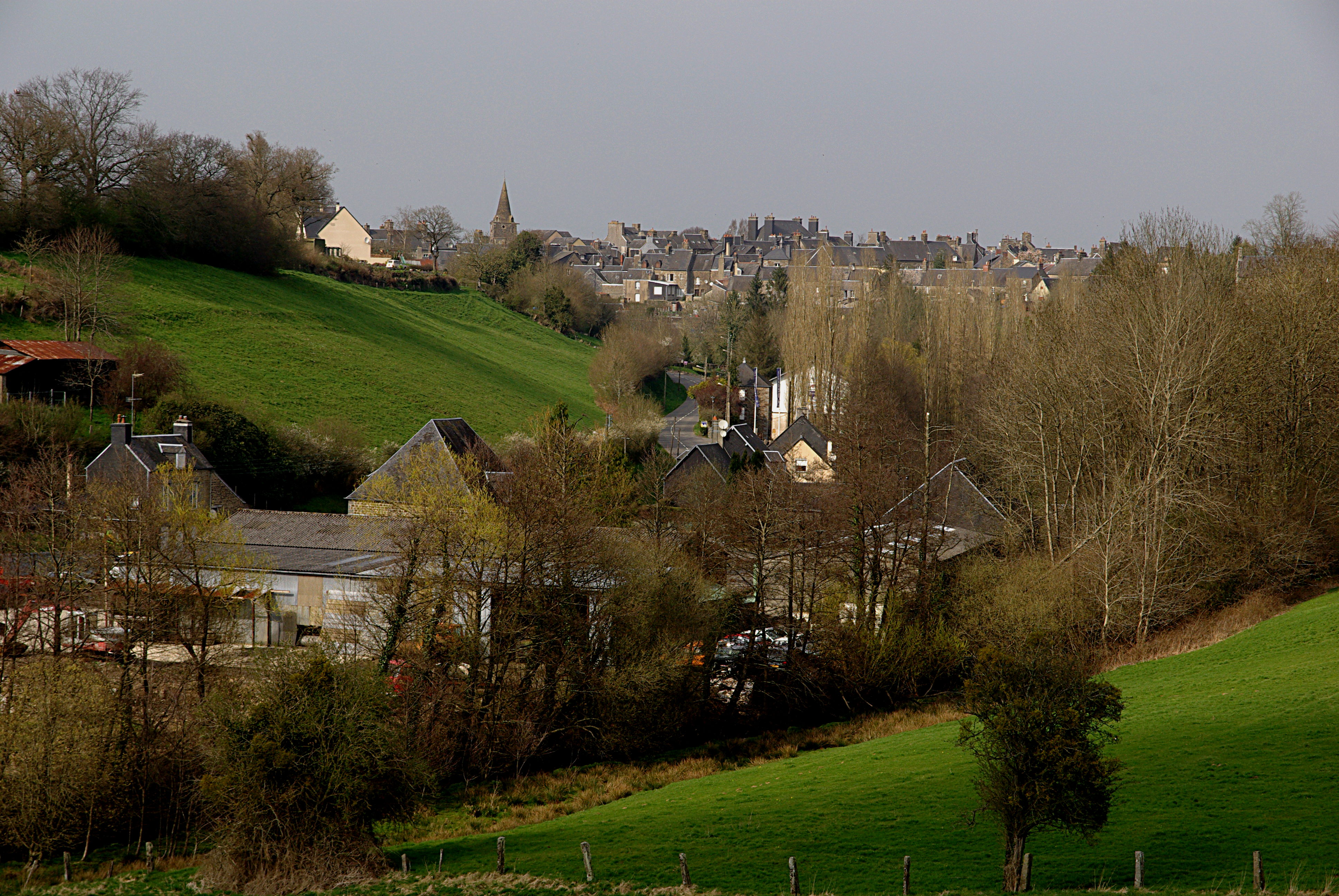
The village of Tinchebray in Normandy in 2008; the site of the Battle of Tinchebray in 1106

Henry's network of allies in Normandy became stronger during 1103. He arranged the marriages of his illegitimate daughters Juliane and Matilda to Eustace of Breteuil and Rotrou III, Count of Perche, respectively, the latter union securing the Norman border. Henry attempted to win over other members of the Norman nobility and gave other English estates and lucrative offers to key Norman lords. Duke Robert continued to fight Robert of Bellême, but the Duke's position worsened, until by 1104, he had to ally himself formally with Bellême to survive. Arguing that the Duke had broken the terms of their treaty, the King crossed over the Channel to Domfront, where he met with senior barons from across Normandy, eager to ally themselves with him. He confronted the Duke and accused him of siding with his enemies, before returning to England.

Normandy continued to disintegrate into chaos. In 1105, Henry sent his friend Robert Fitzhamon and a force of knights into the Duchy, apparently to provoke a confrontation with Duke Robert. Fitzhamon was captured, and Henry used this as an excuse to invade, promising to restore peace and order. Henry had the support of most of the neighbouring counts around Normandy's borders, and King Philip of France was persuaded to remain neutral. Henry occupied western Normandy, and advanced east on Bayeux, where Fitzhamon was held. The city refused to surrender, and Henry besieged it, burning it to the ground. Terrified of meeting the same fate, the town of Caen switched sides and surrendered, allowing Henry to advance on Falaise, Calvados, which he took with some casualties. His campaign stalled, and the King instead began peace discussions with Robert. The negotiations were inconclusive and the fighting dragged on until Christmas, when Henry returned to England.

Henry invaded again in July 1106, hoping to provoke a decisive battle. After some initial tactical successes, he turned south-west towards the castle of Tinchebray. He besieged the castle and Duke Robert, supported by Robert of Bellême, advanced from Falaise to relieve it. After attempts at negotiation failed, the Battle of Tinchebray took place, probably on 28 September. (Note: Contemporary chroniclers provided several possible dates for the battle, suggesting either 27, 28 or 29 September. Modern historians more commonly use 28 September, although historian Judith Green is less certain.) The battle lasted around an hour, and began with a charge by Duke Robert's cavalry; the infantry and dismounted knights of both sides then joined the battle. Henry's reserves, led by Elias I, Count of Maine, and Alan IV, Duke of Brittany, attacked the enemy's flanks, routing first Bellême's troops and then the bulk of the ducal forces. Duke Robert was taken prisoner, but Bellême escaped.

Henry mopped up the remaining resistance in Normandy, and Duke Robert ordered his last garrisons to surrender. Reaching Rouen, Henry reaffirmed the laws and customs of Normandy and took homage from the leading barons and citizens. The lesser prisoners taken at Tinchebray were released, but the Duke and several other leading nobles were imprisoned indefinitely. The Duke's son, William Clito, was only three years old and was released to the care of Helias of Saint-Saens, a Norman baron. Henry reconciled himself with Robert of Bellême, who gave up the ducal lands he had seized and rejoined the royal court. Henry had no way of legally removing the Duchy from his brother, and initially Henry avoided using the title "duke" at all, emphasising that, as the king of England, he was only acting as the guardian of the troubled Duchy.

== Government, family and household ==
=== Government, law and court ===
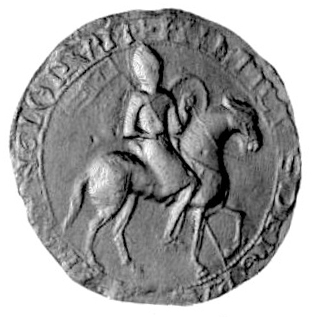
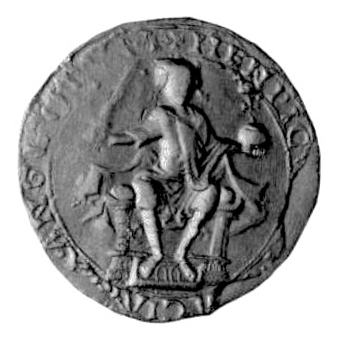
Henry's royal seal, showing the King on horseback (l) and seated on his throne (r)

Henry inherited the kingdom of England from William Rufus, giving him a claim of suzerainty over Wales and Scotland, and acquired the Duchy of Normandy, a complex entity with troubled borders. The borders between England and Scotland were still uncertain during Henry's reign, with Anglo-Norman influence pushing northwards through Cumbria, but his relationship with King David I of Scotland was generally good, partially due to Henry's marriage to his sister. In Wales, Henry used his power to coerce and charm the indigenous Welsh princes, while Norman Marcher Lords pushed across the valleys of South Wales. Normandy was controlled via interlocking networks of ducal, ecclesiastical and family contacts, backed by a growing string of important ducal castles along the borders. Alliances and relationships with neighbouring counties along the Norman border were particularly important to maintaining the stability of the Duchy.

Henry ruled through the barons and lords in England and Normandy, whom he manipulated skilfully for political effect. Political friendships, termed amicitia in Latin, were important during the 12th century, and Henry maintained a wide range of these, mediating between his friends in factions across his realm when necessary, and rewarding those who were loyal to him. He also had a reputation for punishing those barons who stood against him, and he maintained an effective network of informers and spies who reported to him on events. Henry was a harsh, firm ruler, but not excessively so by the standards of the day. Over time, he increased the degree of his control over the barons, removing his enemies and bolstering his friends until the "reconstructed baronage", as historian Warren Hollister describes it, was predominantly loyal and dependent on the King.

Henry's itinerant royal court comprised several parts. At the heart was his domestic household, called the domus; a wider grouping was termed the familia regis, and formal gatherings of the court were termed curia. The domus was divided into several parts. The chapel, headed by the chancellor, looked after the royal documents, the chamber dealt with financial affairs and the master-marshal was responsible for travel and accommodation. The familia regis included Henry's mounted household troops, up to several hundred strong, who came from a wider range of social backgrounds, and could be deployed across England and Normandy as required. Initially Henry continued his father's practice of regular crown-wearing ceremonies at his curia, but they became less frequent as the years passed. Henry's court was grand and ostentatious, financing the construction of large new buildings and castles with a range of precious gifts on display, including his private menagerie of exotic animals, which he kept at Woodstock Palace. Despite being a lively community, Henry's court was more tightly controlled than those of previous kings. Strict rules controlled personal behaviour and prohibited members of the court from pillaging neighbouring villages, as had been the norm under William Rufus.

Henry was responsible for a substantial expansion of the royal justice system. (Note: Geoffrey of Monmouth memorably likened Henry to the "Lion of Justice" in his Historia Regum Britanniae, in a section in which he recounts the prophecies of Merlin. Despite Henry not being named in the document itself, historians are broadly agreed that Geoffrey intended to refer to him, but there are differing interpretations of the simile itself. Judith Green, for example, argues that the description was a positive one; Alan Cooper is far more cautious, noting that, in this period, lions were considered to be strong but also brutal and cruel, and that the surrounding context in the section is certainly not flattering about its subject.) In England, Henry drew on the existing Anglo-Saxon system of justice, local government and taxes, but strengthened it with more central governmental institutions. Roger of Salisbury began to develop the royal exchequer after 1110, using it to collect and audit revenues from the King's sheriffs in the shires. Itinerant justices began to emerge under Henry, travelling around the country managing eyre courts, and many more laws were formally recorded. Henry gathered increasing revenue from the expansion of royal justice, both from fines and from fees. The first Pipe Roll that is known to have survived dates from 1130, recording royal expenditures. Henry reformed the coinage in 1107, 1108 and in 1125, inflicting harsh corporal punishments to English coiners who had been found guilty of debasing the currency. (Note: In 1124, Henry received reports from his soldiers that they had been paid in substandard English silver pennies. He instructed Roger of Salisbury to investigate, and ordered that any coiners found guilty were to have their right hands and genitals chopped off. The sentence was carried out at Salisbury by the Bishop. Contemporary chroniclers approved of Henry's firm action.) In Normandy, he restored law and order after 1106, operating through a body of Norman justices and an exchequer system similar to that in England. Norman institutions grew in scale and scope under Henry, although less quickly than in England. Many of the officials that ran Henry's system were termed "new men", relatively low-born individuals who rose through the ranks as administrators, managing justice or the royal revenues. (Note: Historian David Crouch has noted that many of Henry's key advisers and officials later regretted their actions on behalf of the King, observing that "life at King Henry's court tended to put a burden on the consciences of its inmates".)

=== Relations with the Church ===
==== Church and the King ====
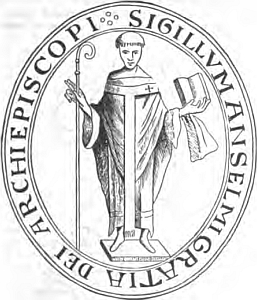
The seal of Archbishop Anselm of Canterbury

Henry's ability to govern was intimately bound up with the Church, which formed the key to the administration of both England and Normandy, and this relationship changed considerably over the course of his reign. William the Conqueror had reformed the English Church with the support of his Archbishop of Canterbury, Lanfranc, who became a close colleague and advisor to the King. (Note: Anselm used the metaphor of the government being a plough pulled by two oxen, the King and the Archbishop, ruling through temporal and religious right respectively.) Under William Rufus this arrangement had collapsed, the King and Archbishop Anselm had become estranged and Anselm had gone into exile. Henry also believed in Church reform, but on taking power in England he became embroiled in the investiture controversy.

The argument concerned who should invest a new bishop with his staff and ring: traditionally, this had been carried out by the King in a symbolic demonstration of royal power, but Pope Urban II had condemned this practice in 1099, arguing that only the papacy could carry out this task, and declaring that the clergy should not give homage to their local temporal rulers. Anselm returned to England from exile in 1100 having heard Urban's pronouncement, and informed Henry that he would be complying with the Pope's wishes. Henry was in a difficult position. On one hand, the symbolism and homage was important to him; on the other hand, he needed Anselm's support in his struggle with his brother Robert.

Anselm stuck firmly to the letter of the papal decree, despite Henry's attempts to persuade him to give way in return for a vague assurance of a future royal compromise. Matters escalated, with Anselm going back into exile and Henry confiscating the revenues of his estates. Anselm threatened excommunication, and in July 1105 the two men finally negotiated a solution. A distinction was drawn between the secular and ecclesiastical powers of the prelates, under which Henry gave up his right to invest his clergy, but retained the custom of requiring them to come and do homage for the temporalities, the landed properties they held in England. Despite this argument, the pair worked closely together, combining to deal with Duke Robert's invasion of 1101, for example, and holding major reforming councils in 1102 and 1108.

A long-running dispute between the Archbishops of Canterbury and York flared up under Anselm's successor, Ralph d'Escures. Canterbury, traditionally the senior of the two establishments, had long argued that the Archbishop of York should formally promise to obey their Archbishop, but York argued that the two episcopates were independent within the English Church and that no such promise was necessary. Henry supported the primacy of Canterbury, to ensure that England remained under a single ecclesiastical administration, but the Pope preferred the case of York. The matter was complicated by Henry's personal friendship with Thurstan, the Archbishop of York, and the King's desire that the case should not end up in a papal court, beyond royal control. Henry needed the support of the Papacy in his struggle with Louis VI of France, however, and therefore allowed Thurstan to attend the Council of Rheims in 1119, where Thurstan was then consecrated by the Pope with no mention of any duty towards Canterbury. Henry believed that this went against assurances Thurstan had previously made and exiled him from England until the King and Archbishop came to a negotiated solution the following year.

Even after the investiture dispute, Henry continued to play a major role in the selection of new English and Norman bishops and archbishops. He appointed many of his officials to bishoprics and, as historian Martin Brett suggests, "some of his officers could look forward to a mitre with all but absolute confidence". Henry's chancellors, and those of his queens, became bishops of Durham, Hereford, London, Lincoln, Winchester and Salisbury. Henry increasingly drew on a wider range of these bishops as advisors – particularly Roger of Salisbury – breaking with the earlier tradition of relying primarily on the Archbishop of Canterbury. The result was a cohesive body of administrators through which Henry could exercise careful influence, holding general councils to discuss key matters of policy. This stability shifted slightly after 1125, when he began to inject a wider range of candidates into the senior positions of the Church, often with more reformist views, and the impact of this generation would be felt in the years after Henry's death.

==== Personal beliefs and piety ====
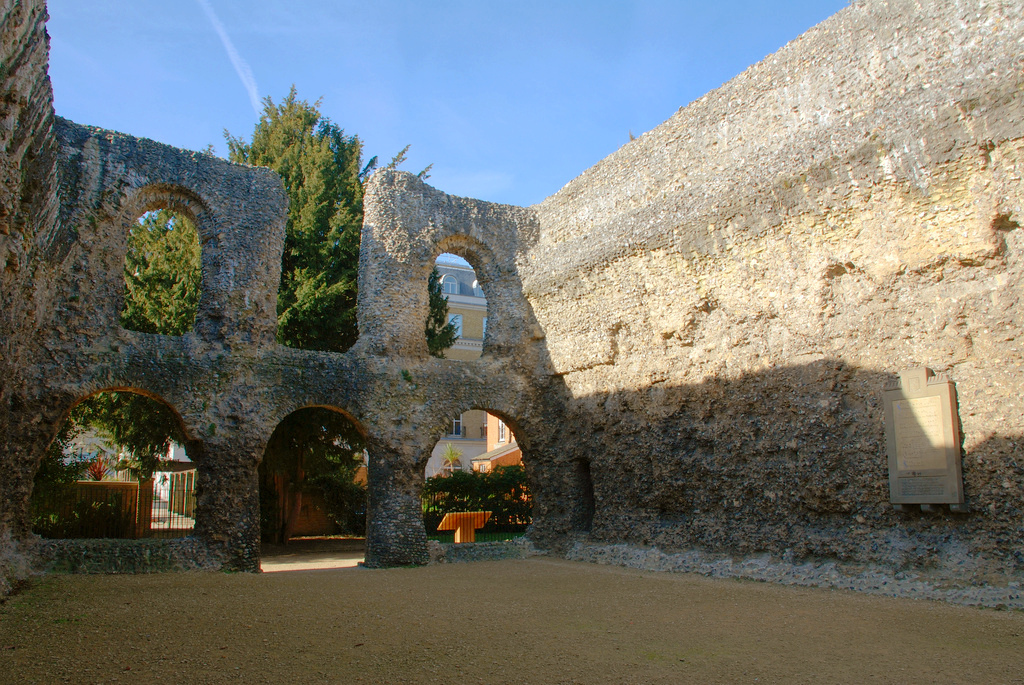
The ruined chapter house of Reading Abbey in 2008

Like other rulers of the period, Henry donated to the Church and patronised several religious communities, but contemporary chroniclers did not consider him an unusually pious king. His personal beliefs and piety may have developed during the course of his life; Henry had always taken an interest in religion, but in his later years he may have become much more concerned about spiritual affairs. If so, the major shifts in his thinking would appear to have occurred after 1120, when his son William Adelin died, and 1129, when his daughter Matilda's marriage to Geoffrey of Anjou teetered on the verge of collapse. (Note: Assessing Henry's personal attitude towards religion later in his life is challenging. Historian Richard Southern argued in favour of the two shifts being in 1120 and 1129, although Martin Brett dismissed 1120 as a probable date, preferring 1129 as the key date. Judith Green is more cautious, observing that the fashion among chroniclers during the later period was to focus more of their writing on the themes of repenting and confession, and this may have given a false impression of a shift in Henry's thinking. Henry Mayr-Harting also doubts the extent of the evidence for a mid-life change, but draws out more of his earlier piety, suggesting that Henry was always more religiously inclined than was once thought.)

As a proponent of religious reform, Henry gave extensively to reformist groups within the Church. He was a keen supporter of the Cluniac order, probably for intellectual reasons. He donated money to the abbey at Cluny itself, and after 1120 gave generously to Reading Abbey, a Cluniac establishment. Construction on Reading began in 1121, prompted by the death of the king's son, and Henry endowed it with rich lands and extensive privileges, making it a symbol of his dynastic lines. He also focused effort on promoting the conversion of communities of clerks into Augustinian canons, the foundation of leper hospitals, expanding the provision of nunneries, and the charismatic orders of the Savigniacs and Tironensians. He was an avid collector of relics, sending an embassy to Constantinople in 1118 to collect Byzantine items, some of which were donated to Reading Abbey.

== Later reign, 1107–1135 ==
=== Continental and Welsh politics, 1108–1114 ===
Normandy faced an increased threat from France, Anjou and Flanders after 1108. Louis VI succeeded to the French throne in 1108 and began to reassert central royal power. Louis demanded Henry give homage to him and that two disputed castles along the Normandy border be placed into the control of neutral castellans. Henry refused, and Louis responded by mobilising an army. After some arguments, the two kings negotiated a truce and retreated without fighting, leaving the underlying issues unresolved. (Note: The chronicler Abbot Suger suggested that the incident was embarrassing for Henry, since he had refused battle, but it was a sound military decision.) Fulk V assumed power in Anjou in 1109 and began to rebuild Angevin authority. He inherited the county of Maine, but refused to recognise Henry as his feudal lord and instead allied himself with Louis. Robert II of Flanders also briefly joined the alliance, before his death in 1111.

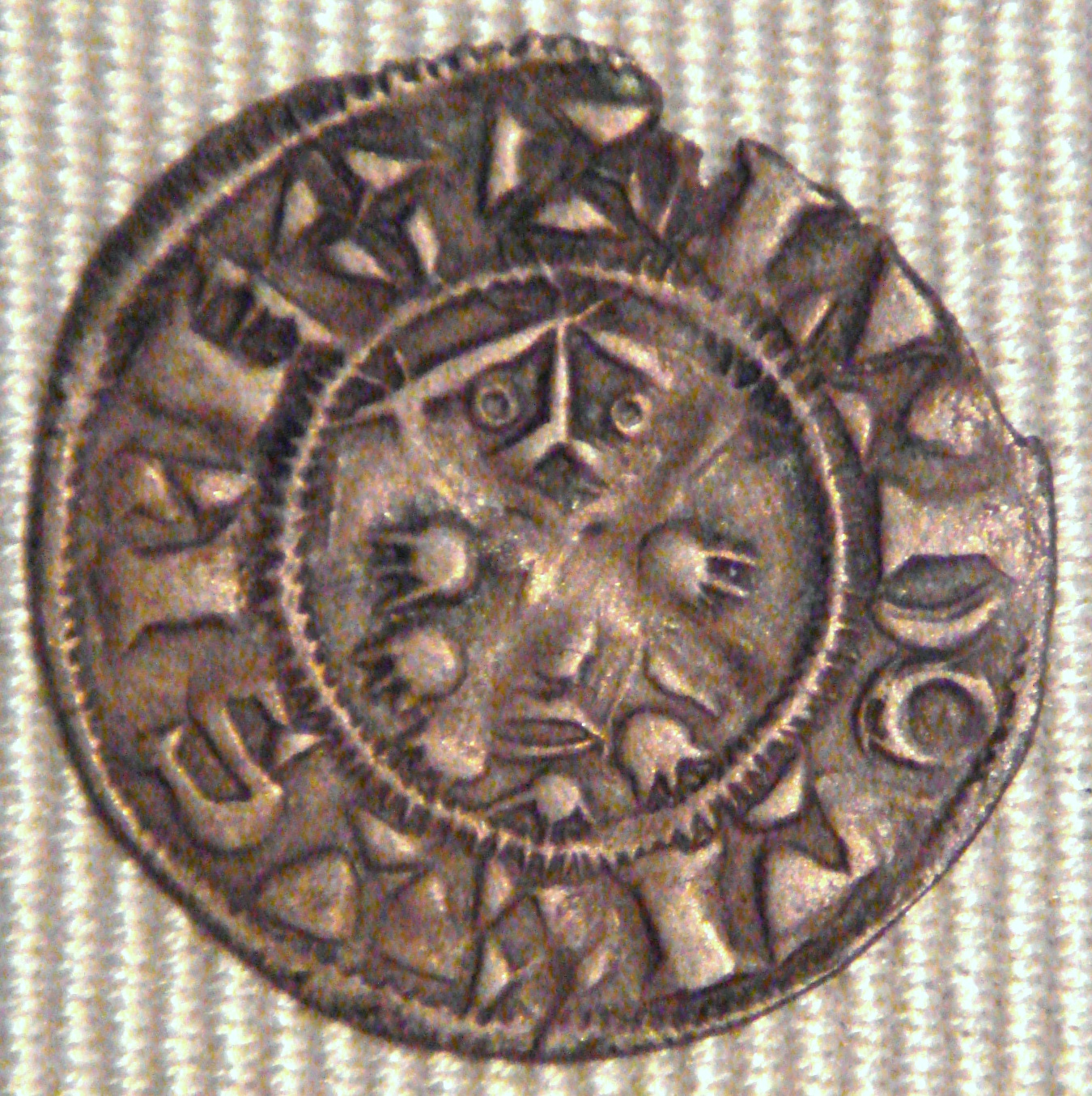
Denier coin of Henry's rival, Louis VI of France

In 1108, Henry betrothed his six-year-old daughter Matilda to Henry V of Germany. For the English king, this was a prestigious match; for Henry V, it was an opportunity to restore his financial situation and fund an expedition to Italy, as he received a dowry of £6,666 from England and Normandy. (Note: The dowry was 10,000 marks in silver, equivalent to £6,666.) Raising this money proved challenging, and required the implementation of a special "aid", or tax, in England. Matilda was crowned German queen in 1110.

Henry responded to the French and Angevin threat by expanding his own network of supporters beyond the Norman borders. Some Norman barons deemed unreliable were arrested or dispossessed, and Henry used their forfeited estates to bribe his potential allies in the neighbouring territories, in particular Maine. Around 1110, Henry attempted to arrest the young William Clito, but William's mentors moved him to the safety of Flanders before he could be taken. At about this time, Henry probably began to style himself as the duke of Normandy. (Note: In Latin, the ducal title was dux Normannorum, literally "Duke of the Normans".) Robert of Bellême turned against Henry once again, and when he appeared at Henry's court in 1112 in a new role as a French ambassador, he was arrested and imprisoned.

Rebellions broke out in France and Anjou between 1111 and 1113, and Henry crossed into Normandy to support his nephew Theobald IV, Count of Blois, who had sided against Louis in the uprising. In a bid to isolate Louis diplomatically, Henry created alliances with Anjou and Brittany by betrothing his young son, William Adelin, to Fulk of Anjou's daughter Matilda and marrying his illegitimate daughter Matilda to Conan III, Duke of Brittany. Louis backed down and in March 1113 met with Henry near Gisors to agree a peace settlement, giving Henry the disputed fortresses and confirming Henry's overlordship of Maine, Bellême and Brittany.

Meanwhile, the situation in Wales was deteriorating. Henry had conducted a campaign in South Wales in 1108, pushing out royal power in the region and colonising the area around Pembroke with Flemings. By 1114, some of the resident Norman lords were under attack, while in Mid-Wales, Owain ap Cadwgan blinded one of the political hostages he was holding, and in North Wales Gruffudd ap Cynan threatened the power of the Earl of Chester. Henry sent three armies into Wales that year, with Gilbert Fitz Richard leading a force from the south, Alexander I of Scotland pressing from the north and Henry himself advancing into Mid-Wales. Owain and Gruffudd sued for peace, and Henry accepted a political compromise. He reinforced the Welsh Marches with his own appointees, strengthening the border territories.

=== Rebellion, 1115–1120 ===
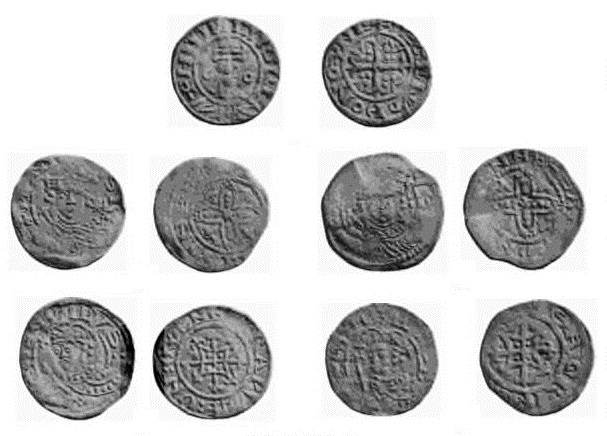
Silver pennies of Henry I, struck at the Oxford mint

Concerned about the succession, Henry sought to persuade Louis VI to accept his son, William Adelin, as the legitimate future Duke of Normandy, in exchange for his son's homage. Henry crossed into Normandy in 1115 and assembled the Norman barons to swear loyalty; he also almost successfully negotiated a settlement with Louis, affirming William's right to the Duchy in exchange for a large sum of money. Louis, backed by his ally Baldwin VII of Flanders, instead declared that he considered William Clito the legitimate heir to the Duchy.

War broke out after Henry returned to Normandy with an army to support Theobald of Blois, who was under attack from Louis. Henry and Louis raided each other's towns along the border, and a wider conflict then broke out, probably in 1116. (Note: The dating of this campaign is uncertain; Judith Green places it firmly in 1116, while Warren Hollister is less certain, opting for it falling between 1116 and 1118.) Henry was pushed onto the defensive as French, Flemish and Angevin forces began to pillage the Normandy countryside. Amaury III of Montfort and many other barons rose up against Henry, and there was an assassination plot from within his own household. Queen Matilda died in early 1118, but the situation in Normandy was sufficiently pressing that Henry was unable to return to England for her funeral.

Henry responded by mounting campaigns against the rebel barons and deepening his alliance with Theobald. Baldwin of Flanders was wounded in battle and died in September 1118, easing the pressure on Normandy from the north-east. Henry attempted to crush a revolt in the city of Alençon, but was defeated by Fulk and the Angevin army. Forced to retreat from Alençon, Henry's position deteriorated alarmingly, as his resources became overstretched and more barons abandoned his cause. Early in 1119, Henry's daughter Juliane and son-in-law Eustace of Breteuil threatened to join the baronial revolt. Hostages were exchanged in a bid to avoid conflict, but relations broke down and both sides mutilated their captives. Henry attacked and took the town of Breteuil, Eure, despite Juliane's attempt to kill her father with a crossbow. (Note: In February 1119, Eustace and Juliane, formerly allies of Henry, threatened to rebel unless they were given the castle of Ivry-la-Bataille. Henry promised Eustace the fortress and, to show good intent, exchanged hostages, the couple's daughters being exchanged with the son of the castle's constable. According to the chronicler Orderic Vitalis, Eustace then blinded the constable's son, whereupon Henry allowed the daughters – his granddaughters – to be blinded and mutilated. Eustace attempted to mobilise his forces and defend Breteuil against an attack by Henry; despite this, Henry took the city and Juliane, after attempting to kill Henry with a crossbow, fled.) In the aftermath, Henry dispossessed the couple of almost all of their lands in Normandy.

Henry's situation improved in May 1119 when he enticed Fulk to switch sides by finally agreeing to marry William Adelin to Fulk's daughter Matilda and paying Fulk a large sum of money. Fulk left for the Levant, leaving the County of Maine in Henry's care, and the King was free to focus on crushing his remaining enemies. During the summer Henry advanced into the Norman Vexin, where he encountered Louis's army, resulting in the Battle of Brémule. Henry appears to have deployed scouts and then organised his troops into several carefully formed lines of dismounted knights. Unlike Henry's forces, the French knights remained mounted; they hastily charged the Anglo-Norman positions, breaking through the first rank of the defences but then becoming entangled in Henry's second line of knights. Surrounded, the French army began to collapse. In the melee, Henry was hit by a sword blow, but his armour protected him. Louis and William Clito escaped from the battle, leaving Henry to return to Rouen in triumph.

The war slowly petered out after this battle, and Louis took the dispute over Normandy to Pope Callixtus II's council in Reims that October. Henry faced French complaints concerning his acquisition and subsequent management of Normandy, and despite being defended by Geoffrey, the Archbishop of Rouen, Henry's case was shouted down by the pro-French elements of the council. Callixtus declined to support Louis, and merely advised the two rulers to seek peace. Amaury de Montfort came to terms with Henry, but Henry and William Clito failed to find a mutually satisfactory compromise. In June 1120, Henry and Louis formally made peace on terms advantageous to the English king: William Adelin gave homage to Louis, and in return Louis confirmed William's rights to the Duchy.

=== Succession crisis, 1120–1124 ===
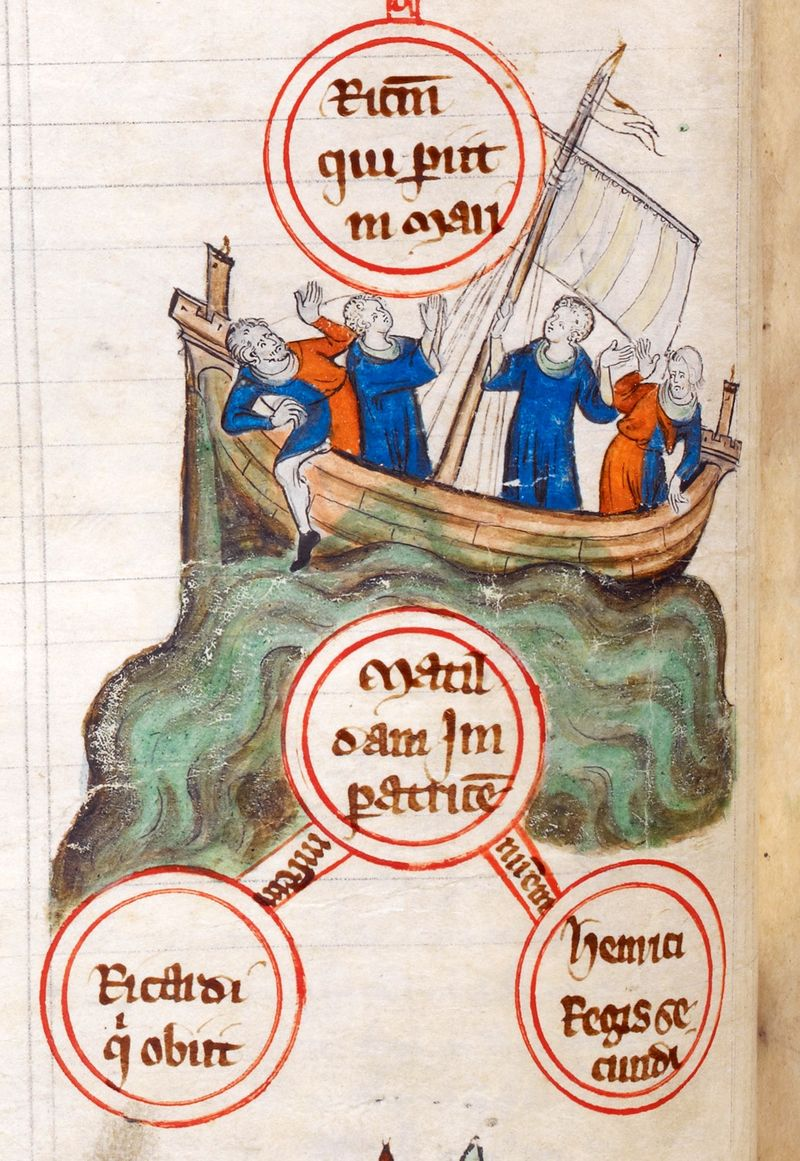
Early 14th-century depiction of the sinking of the White Ship at Barfleur on 25 November 1120

Henry's succession plans were thrown into chaos by the sinking of the White Ship off the French coast on 25 November 1120. Henry had left the port of Barfleur for England in the early evening, leaving William Adelin and many of the younger members of the court to follow on that night in a separate vessel, the White Ship. Both the crew and passengers were drunk and, just outside the harbour, the ship hit a submerged rock. (Note: The submerged rock was probably the Quillebœuf Rock.) The ship sank, killing as many as 300 people, with only one survivor, a butcher from Rouen. Henry's court was initially too scared to report William's death to the King. When he was finally told, he collapsed with grief.

The disaster left Henry with no legitimate son, his nephews now the closest possible male heirs. Henry announced he would take a new wife, Adeliza of Louvain, opening up the prospect of a new royal son, and the two were married at Windsor Castle in January 1121. (Note: The speed with which Henry's second marriage took place may indicate that he had been planning to remarry anyway, even before the White Ship disaster.) Henry appears to have chosen her because she was attractive and came from a prestigious noble line. Adeliza seems to have been fond of Henry and joined him in his travels, probably to maximise the chances of her conceiving a child. The White Ship disaster initiated fresh conflict in Wales, where the drowning of Richard, Earl of Chester, encouraged a rebellion led by Maredudd ap Bleddyn. Henry intervened in North Wales that summer with an army and, although he was hit by a Welsh arrow, the campaign reaffirmed royal power across the region.

Henry's alliance with Anjou – which had been based on his son William marrying Fulk's daughter Matilda – began to disintegrate. Fulk returned from the Levant and demanded that Henry return Matilda and her dowry, a range of estates and fortifications in Maine. Matilda left for Anjou, but Henry argued that the dowry had in fact originally belonged to him before it came into the possession of Fulk, and so declined to hand the estates back to Anjou. Fulk married his daughter Sibylla to William Clito, and granted them Maine. Once again, conflict broke out, as Amaury de Montfort allied himself with Fulk and led a revolt along the Norman-Anjou border in 1123. Amaury was joined by several other Norman barons, headed by Waleran de Beaumont, one of the sons of Henry's old ally, Robert of Meulan. (Note: It is uncertain what led Waleran de Beaumont to rebel against Henry. Waleran may have genuinely believed that William Clito had a rightful claim to the Duchy, and have thought that he was unlikely to benefit under Henry's rule.)

Henry dispatched his illegitimate son Robert of Gloucester and Ranulf le Meschin to Normandy and then intervened himself in late 1123. He began the process of besieging the rebel castles, before wintering in the Duchy. In the spring of 1124, campaigning began again. In the Battle of Bourgthéroulde, fought near Rouen, Borleng, castellan of Bernay, Eure, led the King's army and received intelligence that the rebels were departing from the rebel base in Beaumont-le-Roger allowing him to ambush them as they traversed through the Brotonne forest. Waleran charged the royal forces, but his knights were cut down by Odo's archers and the rebels were quickly overwhelmed. Waleran was captured, but Amaury escaped. Henry mopped up the remainder of the rebellion, blinding some of the rebel leaders – considered, at the time, a more merciful punishment than execution – and recovering the last rebel castles. He paid Pope Callixtus a large amount of money, in exchange for the Papacy annulling the marriage of William Clito and Sibylla on the grounds of consanguinity. (Note: Medieval Church law at the time forbade marriage within seven degrees. In practice most of the upper classes were related in this way, but the law could be invoked on occasion to annul marriages.)

=== Planning the succession, 1125–1134 ===
Henry and Adeliza did not conceive any children, generating prurient speculation as to the possible explanation, and the future of the dynasty appeared at risk. (Note: It is not known precisely what the rumours about Henry's failure to bear children were, and whether the issue lay with one or both partners.) Henry may have begun to look among his nephews for a possible heir. He may have considered Stephen of Blois as a possible option and, perhaps in preparation for this, he arranged a beneficial marriage for Stephen to the wealthy heiress Matilda of Boulogne. Theobald of Blois, his close ally, may have also felt that he was in favour with Henry. William Clito, who was Louis VI's preferred choice, remained opposed to Henry and was therefore unsuitable. Henry may have also considered his own illegitimate son, Robert of Gloucester, as a possible candidate, but English tradition and custom would have looked unfavourably on this.

Henry's plans shifted when his son-in-law, Holy Roman Emperor Henry V, died in 1125. The King recalled his widowed daughter, Empress Matilda, to England the next year and declared that, should he die without a male heir, she was to be his rightful successor. The Anglo-Norman barons were gathered together at Westminster at Christmas 1126, where they swore to recognise Matilda and any future legitimate heir she might have. (Note: Medieval chroniclers' accounts of this oath vary on the points of detail. William of Malmesbury described that those present recognised Matilda as the legitimate heir on the basis of her paternal and maternal royal descent; John of Worcester described the inheritance of England as being conditional on Matilda having a legitimate male heir; the Anglo-Saxon chronicle suggested that an oath was given concerning the inheritance of both England and Normandy; neither Orderic nor Henry of Huntingdon recorded the event at all. Some chronicler accounts may have been influenced by Stephen's acquisition of the throne in 1135 and the later events of the Anarchy.) Putting forward a woman as a potential heir in this way was unusual: opposition to Matilda continued to exist within the English court, and Louis was vehemently opposed to her candidacy.

Fresh conflict broke out in 1127, when the childless Charles I, Count of Flanders, was murdered, creating a local succession crisis. With Louis's support, the Flemings chose William Clito to become their new ruler. This development potentially threatened Normandy, and Henry began to finance a proxy war in Flanders, promoting the claims of William's Flemish rivals. In an effort to disrupt the French alliance with William, Henry mounted an attack into France in 1128, forcing Louis to cut his aid to William. William died unexpectedly in July, removing the last major challenger to Henry's rule and bringing the war in Flanders to a halt. Without William, the baronial opposition in Normandy lacked a leader. A fresh peace was made with France, and Henry was finally able to release the remaining prisoners from the revolt of 1123, including Waleran of Meulan, who was rehabilitated into the royal court.

Meanwhile, Henry rebuilt his alliance with Fulk of Anjou, this time by marrying Matilda to Fulk's eldest son, Geoffrey. The pair were betrothed in 1127 and married the following year. It is unknown whether Henry intended Geoffrey to have any future claim on England or Normandy, and he was probably keeping his son-in-law's status deliberately uncertain. Similarly, although Matilda was granted several castles in Normandy as part of her dowry, it was not specified when the couple would actually take possession of them. Fulk left Anjou for Jerusalem in 1129, declaring Geoffrey the Count of Anjou and Maine. The marriage proved difficult, as the couple did not particularly like each other and the disputed castles proved a point of contention, resulting in Matilda returning to Normandy later that year. Henry appears to have blamed Geoffrey for the separation, but in 1131 the couple were reconciled. Much to the pleasure and relief of Henry, Matilda then gave birth to two sons, Henry and Geoffrey, in 1133 and 1134.

== Death and legacy ==
=== Death ===
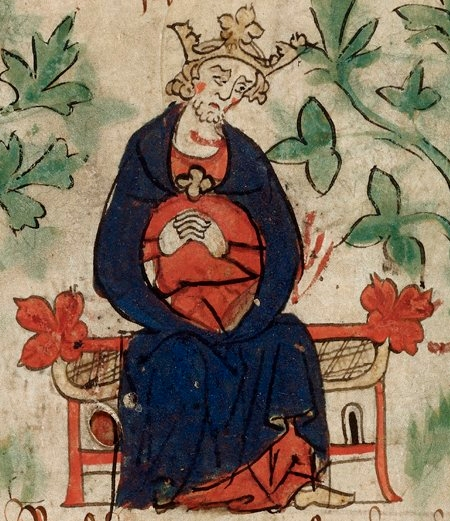
Early 14th-century depiction of Henry mourning the death of his son

Relations among Henry, Matilda, and Geoffrey became increasingly strained during the King's final years. Matilda and Geoffrey suspected that they lacked genuine support in England. In 1135 they urged Henry to hand over the royal castles in Normandy to Matilda while he was still alive, and insisted that the Norman nobility swear immediate allegiance to her, thereby giving the couple a more powerful position after Henry's death. Henry angrily declined to do so, probably out of concern that Geoffrey would try to seize power in Normandy. A fresh rebellion broke out among the barons in southern Normandy, led by William III, Count of Ponthieu, whereupon Geoffrey and Matilda intervened in support of the rebels.

Henry campaigned throughout the autumn, strengthening the southern frontier, and then travelled to Lyons-la-Forêt in November to enjoy some hunting, still apparently healthy. There he fell ill – according to the chronicler Henry of Huntingdon, he ate too many ("a surfeit of") lampreys against his physician's advice – and his condition worsened over the course of a week. It is improbable that eating too many lampreys was actually the cause of his death. A Listeria monocytogenes infection has been proposed as a more likely cause. Once the condition appeared terminal, Henry gave confession and summoned Archbishop Hugh of Amiens, who was joined by Robert of Gloucester and other members of the court. In accordance with custom, preparations were made to settle Henry's outstanding debts and to revoke outstanding sentences of forfeiture. The King died on 1 December 1135, and his corpse was taken to Rouen accompanied by the barons, where it was embalmed; his entrails were buried locally at the priory of Notre-Dame du Pré, and the preserved body was taken on to England, where it was interred at Reading Abbey.

Despite Henry's efforts, the succession was disputed. When news began to spread of the King's death, Geoffrey and Matilda were in Anjou supporting the rebels in their campaign against the royal army, which included a number of Matilda's supporters such as Robert of Gloucester. Many of these barons had taken an oath to stay in Normandy until the late king was properly buried, which prevented them from returning to England. The Norman nobility discussed declaring Theobald of Blois king. Theobald's younger brother Stephen quickly crossed from Boulogne to England, accompanied by his military household. Hugh Bigod dubiously testified that Henry, on his deathbed, had released the barons from their oath to Matilda, and with the help of his brother Henry of Blois, Stephen seized power in England and was crowned king on 22 December. Matilda did not give up her claim to England and Normandy, appealing at first to the Pope against the decision to allow the coronation of Stephen, and then invading England to start a prolonged civil war, known as the Anarchy, between 1135 and 1153.

=== Historiography ===
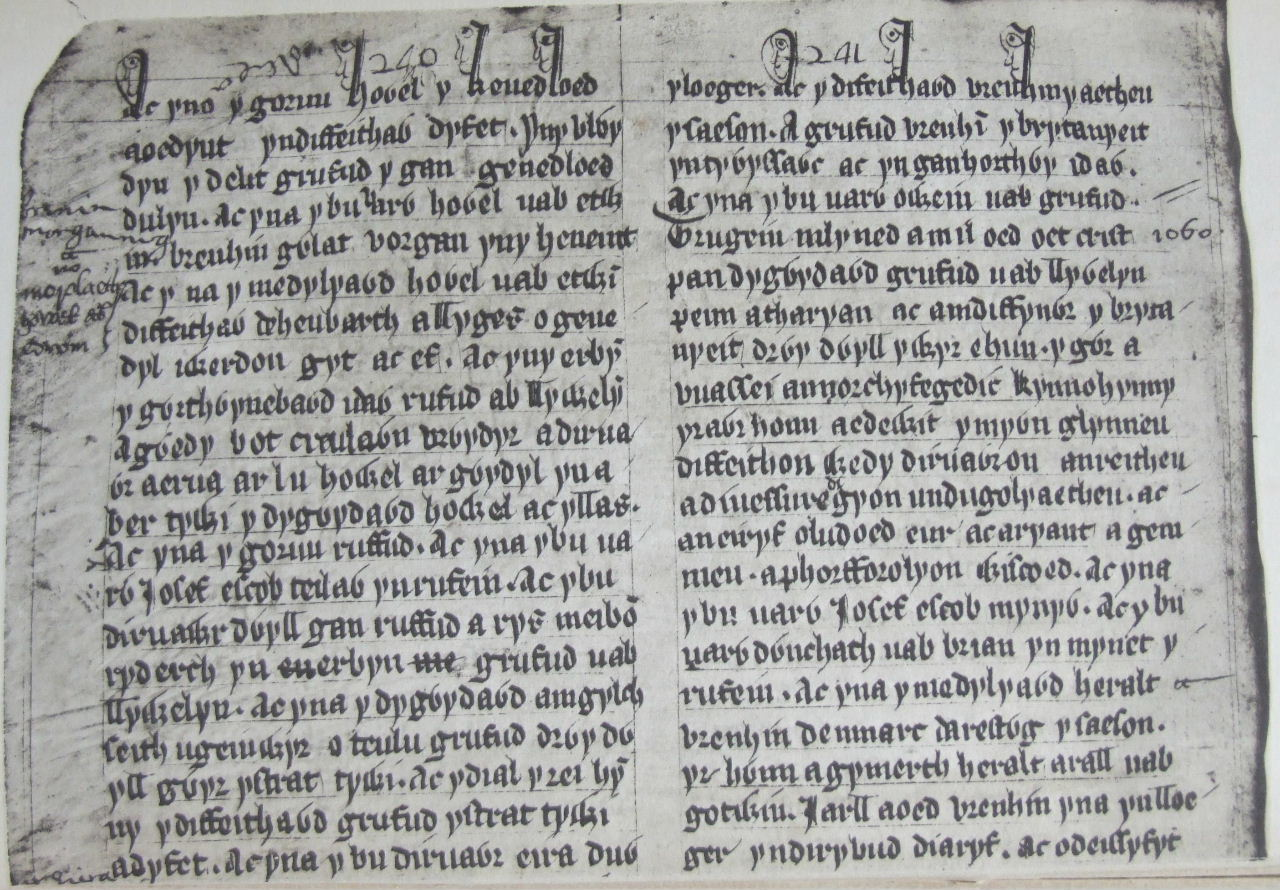
Part of the Welsh Brut y Tywysogion, one of the chronicler sources for Henry's reign

Historians have drawn on a range of sources on Henry, including the accounts of chroniclers; other documentary evidence, including early pipe rolls; and surviving buildings and architecture. The three main chroniclers to describe the events of Henry's life were William of Malmesbury, Orderic Vitalis, and Henry of Huntingdon, but each incorporated extensive social and moral commentary into their accounts and borrowed a range of literary devices and stereotypical events from other popular works. Other chroniclers include Eadmer, Hugh the Chanter, Abbot Suger, and the authors of the Welsh Brut. Not all royal documents from the period have survived, but there are several royal acts, charters, writs, and letters, along with some early financial records. Some of these have since been discovered to be forgeries, and others had been subsequently amended or tampered with.

Late medieval historians seized on the accounts of selected chroniclers regarding Henry's education and gave him the title of Henry "Beauclerc", a theme echoed in the analysis of Victorian and Edwardian historians such as Francis Palgrave and Henry Davis. The historian Charles David dismissed this argument in 1929, showing the more extreme claims for Henry's education to be without foundation. Modern histories of Henry commenced with Richard Southern's work in the early 1960s, followed by extensive research during the rest of the 20th century into a wide variety of themes from his reign in England, and a much more limited number of studies of his rule in Normandy. Only two major, modern biographies of Henry have been produced, C. Warren Hollister's posthumous volume in 2001, and Judith Green's 2006 work.

Interpretation of Henry's personality by historians has altered over time. Earlier historians such as Austin Poole and Richard Southern considered Henry a cruel, draconian ruler. More recent historians, such as Hollister and Green, view his implementation of justice much more sympathetically, particularly when set against the standards of the day, but even Green has noted that Henry was "in many respects highly unpleasant", and Alan Cooper has observed that many contemporary chroniclers were probably too scared of the King to voice much criticism. Historians have also debated the extent to which Henry's administrative reforms genuinely constituted an introduction of what Hollister and John Baldwin have termed systematic, "administrative kingship", or whether his outlook remained fundamentally traditional.

== Burial site ==
Henry's burial at Reading Abbey is marked by a local cross and a plaque, but Reading Abbey was slowly demolished during the Dissolution of the Monasteries in the 16th century. The exact location is uncertain, but the most likely location of the tomb itself is now in a built-up area of central Reading, on the site of the former abbey choir. A plan to locate his remains was announced in March 2015, with support from English Heritage and Philippa Langley, who aided with the successful discovery and exhumation of Richard III. As of 2026 this has been unsuccessful.

== Family and children ==
=== Legitimate ===
In addition to Matilda and William, Henry possibly had a short-lived son, Richard, with his first wife, Matilda of Scotland. Henry and his second wife, Adeliza of Louvain, had no children.

=== Illegitimate ===
Henry had a number of illegitimate children by various mistresses. (Note: Work by historian Geoffrey White in the 1940s produced an extensive list of Henry's illegitimate children, which forms the basis of the most recent academic research, by Kathleen Thompson.)

==== Sons ====
1. Robert FitzRoy, Earl of Gloucester, born in the 1090s to a woman of Gay family of north Oxfordshire;
2. Richard, born to Ansfride, brought up by Robert Bloet, the Bishop of Lincoln;
3. Reginald de Dunstanville, Earl of Cornwall, born in the 1110s or early 1120s, possibly to Sibyl Corbet;
4. Robert FitzEdith, born in 1093 to Edith Forne;
5. Gilbert FitzRoy, possibly born to an unnamed sister or daughter of Walter of Gand;
6. William de Tracy, possibly born in the 1090s;
7. Henry FitzRoy, possibly born to Nest ferch Rhys; (Note: Traditionally Henry's mother has been given as Nest ferch Rhys, although more recent work by Kathleen Thompson casts doubt on this theory.)
8. Fulk FitzRoy, possibly born to Ansfride;
9. William, the full brother of Sybilla of Normandy, probably also of Reginald de Dunstanville.

==== Daughters ====
1. Matilda FitzRoy, Countess of Perche;
2. Matilda FitzRoy, Duchess of Brittany;
3. Juliane, wife of Eustace of Breteuil, possibly born to Ansfrida;
4. Mabel, wife of William Gouet;
5. Constance, Viscountess of Beaumont-sur-Sarthe;
6. Aline, wife of Matthew de Montmorency;
7. Isabel, daughter of Isabel de Beaumont, Countess of Pembroke;
8. Sybilla de Normandy, Queen of Scotland, probably born before 1100; (Note: White argued that Sibyl's mother was Sibyl Corbet, although more recent research by Kathleen Thompson discredits this theory.)
9. Matilda Fitzroy, Abbess of Montivilliers;
10. Gundrada de Dunstanville;
11. Possibly Rohese, wife of Henry de la Pomerai; (Note: Rohese may have been Henry's daughter, but it is more probable that her father was Herbert fitz Herbert.)
12. Emma, wife of Guy of Laval;
13. Adeliza;
14. Elizabeth Fitzroy, possibly the wife of Fergus of Galloway;
15. Possibly Sibyl of Falaise. (Note: Sibyl may have been Henry's daughter, but it is more probable that her father was his brother Robert of Normandy.)

=== Family tree ===
Norman English and early Plantagenet monarchs and their relationship with rulers of Western Europe
: Red borders indicate English monarchs
: Bold borders indicate legitimate children of English monarchs

Baldwin II; King of Jerusalem	Fulk IV; Count of Anjou	Bertrade	Philip I King of France	William the Conqueror; King of England r. 1066–1087	Margaret	Malcolm III; King of Scotland
Melisende; Queen of Jerusalem	Fulk V King of Jerusalem	Eremburga; Countess of Maine	Robert Curthose	William II; King of England r. 1087–1100	Adela	Henry I King of England r. 1100–1135	Edith/Matilda	Duncan II; King of Scotland	Edgar; King of Scotland	Alexander I King of Scotland	David I King of Scotland
Sibylla	William Clito	Stephen; King of England r. 1135–1154	Geoffrey Plantagenet; Count of Anjou	Empress Matilda	Henry V Holy Roman Emperor	William Adelin; Duke of Normandy	Matilda	Sybilla	Henry
Margaret	Philip of Alsace; Count of Flanders	Louis VII; King of France	Eleanor	Henry II; King of England r. 1154–1189	Geoffrey; Count of Nantes	William FitzEmpress; Viscount of Dieppe	Malcolm IV; King of Scotland	William the Lion; King of Scotland
Baldwin I Latin Emperor, Count of Flanders, and Count of Hainaut	Isabella	Philip II; King of France	Henry	Matilda	Richard I King of England r. 1189–1199	Geoffrey II; Duke of Brittany	Eleanor	Alfonso VIII; King of Castile	Joan	William II; King of Sicily	John; King of England r. 1199–1216
Louis VIII; King of France	Otto IV; Holy Roman Emperor	Arthur I Duke of Brittany	Blanche	Henry III; King of England r. 1216–1272	Richard of Cornwall; King of the Romans	Joan	Alexander II; King of Scotland

== See also ==
- List of earls in the reign of Henry I of England
- House of Plantagenet

== Bibliography ==
- Baldwin, Stewart (2002). The Henry Project: The Ancestors of King Henry II of England. The American Society of Genealogists.
- Barlow, Frank (1999). The Feudal Kingdom of England, 1042–1216 (5th ed.). Harlow, UK: Pearson Education. ISBN 978-0-5823-8117-9.
- Bethell, Denis (1971). "The Making of a Twelfth Century Relic Collection". Popular Belief and Practice. 8: 61–72.
- Brett, Martin (1975). The English Church Under Henry I. Oxford, UK: Oxford University Press. ISBN 978-0-1982-1861-6.
- Carpenter, David (2004). The Struggle for Mastery: The Penguin History of Britain 1066–1284. London: Penguin. ISBN 978-0-1401-4824-4.
- Chibnall, Marjorie (1992). "Mercenaries and the Familia Regis under Henry I". In Strickland, Matthew (ed.). Anglo-Norman Warfare. Woodbridge, UK: The Boydell Press. pp. 93–127. ISBN 978-0-8511-5327-8.
- Chibnall, Marjorie (1993). The Empress Matilda: Queen Consort, Queen Mother and Lady of the English. Oxford, UK: Blackwell. ISBN 978-0-6311-9028-8.
- Crouch, David (1986). The Beaumont Twins: The Roots and Branches of Power in the Twelfth Century. Cambridge University Press. ISBN 0-5213-0215-3. OL 21497976M.
- Crouch, David (2002). The Normans: The History of a Dynasty. London: Hambledon Continuum. ISBN 978-1-8528-5595-6.
- Cooper, Alan (2001). "'The Feet of Those That Bark Shall Be Cut Off': Timorous Historians and the Personality of Henry I". In Gillingham, John (ed.). Anglo-Norman Studies: Proceedings of the Battle Conference, 2000. Woodbridge, UK: The Boydell Press. pp. 47–68. ISBN 978-0-8511-5825-9.
- David, Charles W. (1929). "The Claim of King Henry I to Be Called Learned". In Taylor, C. H.; LaMonte, J. L (eds.). Anniversary Essays in Medieval History by Students of Charles Homer Haskins. Boston & New York: Houghton Mifflin. pp. 45–56. OCLC 615486047.
- Davies, R. R. (1990). Domination and Conquest: The Experience of Ireland, Scotland and Wales, 1100–1300. Cambridge, UK: Cambridge University Press. ISBN 978-0-5210-2977-3.
- Duffy, Mark (2003). Royal Tombs of Medieval England. Stroud, UK: Tempus. ISBN 978-0-7524-2579-5.
- Green, Judith (1989). The Government of England Under Henry I. Cambridge, UK: Cambridge University Press. ISBN 978-0-5213-7586-3.
- Green, Judith (2003). "Le Gouvernement d'Henri Ier Beauclerc en Normandie". In Bouet, Pierre; Gazeau, Véronique (eds.). La Normandie et l'Angleterre au Moyen âge (in French). Caen, France: Publications du CRAHM. pp. 61–73. ISBN 978-2-9026-8514-1.
- Green, Judith (2009). Henry I: King of England and Duke of Normandy. Cambridge, UK: Cambridge University Press. ISBN 978-0-5217-4452-2.
- Hallam, Elizabeth M.; Everard, Judith A. (2001). Capetian France, 987–1328 (2nd ed.). Harlow, UK: Longman. ISBN 978-0-5824-0428-1.
- Haskins, Charles Homer (1918). Norman Institutions. Cambridge, US: Harvard University Press. OCLC 459798602.
- Hollister, C. Warren; Baldwin, John W. (1978). "The Rise of Administrative Kingship: Henry I and Philip Augustus". The American Historical Review. 83 (4): 867–805. doi:10.2307/1867650. ISSN 0002-8762. JSTOR 1867650.
- Hollister, C. Warren (2003). Frost, Amanda Clark (ed.). Henry I. New Haven, US & London: Yale University Press. ISBN 978-0-3000-9829-7.
- Huneycutt, Lois L. (2003). Matilda of Scotland: a Study in Medieval Queenship. Woodbridge, UK: The Boydell Press. ISBN 978-0-8511-5994-2.
- King, Edmund (2010). King Stephen. New Haven, US and London: Yale University Press. ISBN 978-0-3001-1223-8.
- Mason, Emma (2008). King Rufus: the Life and Murder of William II of England. Stroud, UK: The History Press. ISBN 978-0-7524-4635-6.
- Mayr-Harting, Henry (2011). Religion, Politics and Society in Britain, 1066–1272. Harlow, UK: Longman. ISBN 978-0-5824-1413-6.
- Newman, Charlotte A. (1988). The Anglo-Norman Nobility in the Reign of Henry I: the Second Generation. Philadelphia: University of Pennsylvania Press. ISBN 978-0-8122-8138-5.
- Poole, A. L. (1993) [1951]. From Domesday Book to Magna Carta, 1087–1216: Oxford History of England. Oxford, UK: Oxford University Press. ISBN 978-0-1928-5287-8.
- Prestwich, J. O. (1992). "The Military Household of the Norman Kings". In Strickland, Matthew (ed.). Anglo-Norman Warfare. Woodbridge, UK: The Boydell Press. pp. 128–142. ISBN 978-0-8511-5327-8.
- Southern, Richard (1962). "The Place of Henry I in English History". Proceedings of the British Academy. 48: 127–169. ISSN 0068-1202.
- Thompson, Kathleen (2003). "Affairs of State: the Illegitimate Children of Henry I". Journal of Medieval History. 29 (2): 129–151. doi:10.1016/S0304-4181(03)00015-0. ISSN 0304-4181. S2CID 144398531.
- Thompson, Kathleen (2007). "From the Thames to Tinchebray: the Role of Normandy in the Early Career of Henry I". In Fleming, Donald F.; Pope, Janet M. (eds.). Henry I and the Anglo-Norman World: Studies in Memory of C. Warren Hollister. Woodbridge, UK: The Boydell Press. pp. 16–26. ISBN 978-1-8438-3293-5.
- Vaughn, Sally N. (2007). "Henry I and the English Church: the Archbishops and the King". In Fleming, Donald F.; Pope, Janet M (eds.). Henry I and the Anglo-Norman World: Studies in Memory of C. Warren Hollister. Woodbridge, UK: The Boydell Press. pp. 133–157. ISBN 978-1-8438-3293-5.
- Ward, Jennifer (2006). Women in England in the Middle Ages. London: Hambledon Continuum. ISBN 978-0-8264-1985-9.
- White, Geoffrey H. (1949). "Appendix D: Henry I's Illegitimate Children". In White, Geoffrey H. (ed.). The Complete Peerage. Vol. 11. London: St. Catherine Press. pp. 105–120. OCLC 568761046.

Henry I of England House of Normandy Born: 1068/1069 Died: 1 December 1135
Regnal titles
Preceded by William Rufus	King of England; 1100–1135	Succeeded by Stephen
Preceded by Robert Curthose	Duke of Normandy; 1106–1120	Succeeded by William Adelin
Preceded by William Adelin	Duke of Normandy; 1120–1135	Succeeded by Stephen
