= William of Breteuil =

Norman aristocrat (died 1103)

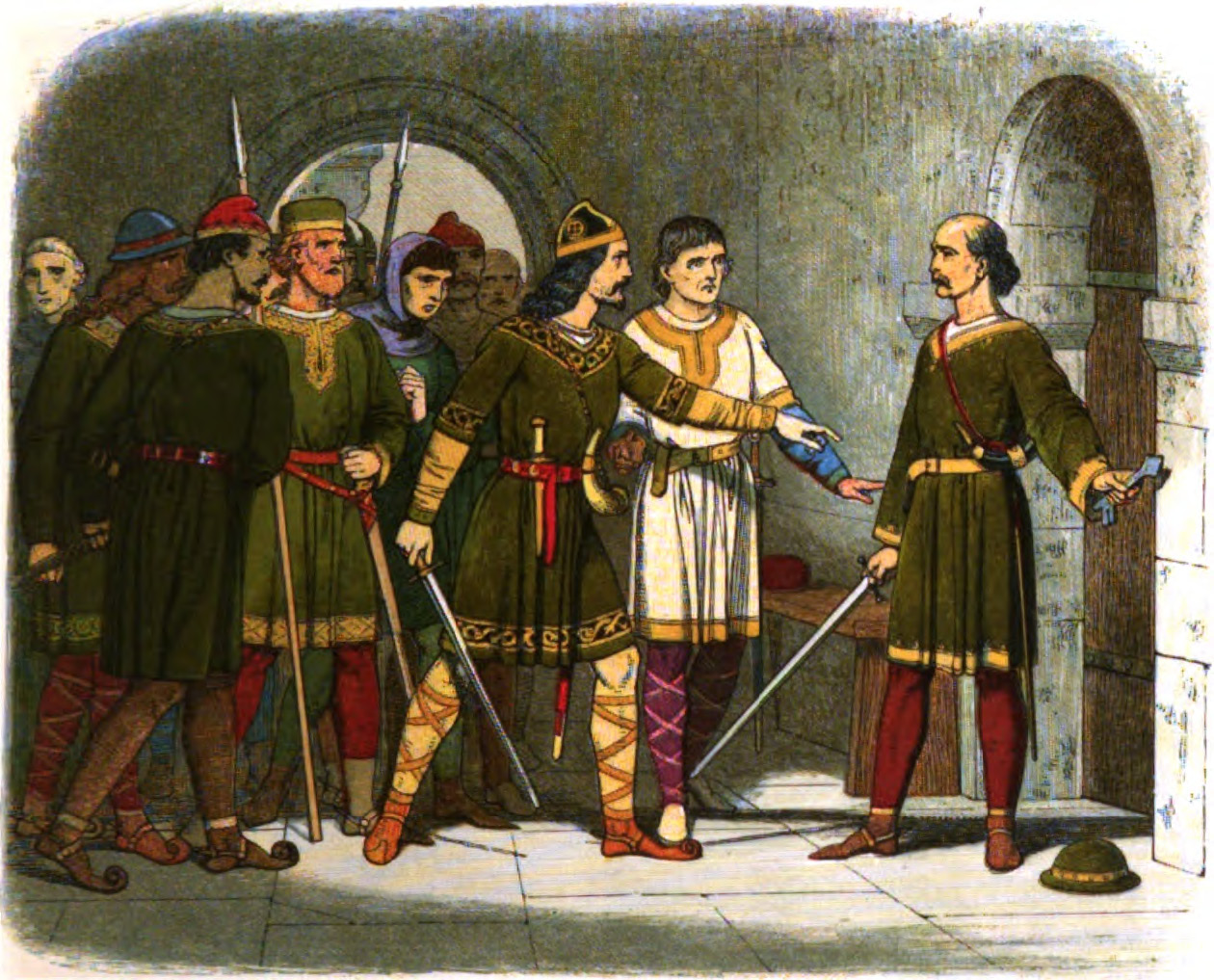
- William of Breteuil defending the Winchester treasury against Prince Henry at the death of William Rufus
- Died: 12 January 1103; Bec Abbey, Normandy, France
- Spouse: Adeline of Montfort
- Issue: Eustace of Breteuil (Eustace de Breteuil); Isabel of Breteuil (Isabel de Breteuil)
- Father: William FitzOsbern
- Mother: Adeliza de Tosny

William of Breteuil or William de Breteuil (French: Guillaume de Breteuil; d. 12 January 1103) was a Norman magnate who held extensive lands in central Normandy as the lord of Breteuil at the end of the reign of King William I and during the chaotic period afterwards when William's eldest son Robert Curthose, duke of Normandy, contested with his younger brother William Rufus, king of England.

Upon the death of William Rufus while hunting in the New Forest, Lord William attempted—but failed—to block Prince Henry seizing the crown jewels from the Winchester treasury and declaring himself king in preference to the crusading Robert. Lord William was later abducted and tortured by a French noble who wanted to marry his illegitimate daughter Isabel.

== Life ==
William was the first-born son of William FitzOsbern, a companion of Duke William II of Normandy during his conquest of England in 1066. Following the conquest, the father became the 1st earl of Hereford. Upon his father's death in 1071 he inherited extensive estates in central Normandy including the lordship of Breteuil and Pacy in Eure.

During the turbulent period following the death of the new English king in 1087, his sons Robert Curthose and William Rufus contested control over Normandy and England and their vassals waged numerous local wars against one another. In November 1090, he aided duke Robert to suppress the Rouen Riot and captured William, son of a wealthy burgher called Ansgar, for ransom. In the conflict between William, count of Evreux, and his half-brother Raoul II, lord of Conches, over their wives' insults towards one another, William of Breteuil and Richard of Montfort allied with Count William and joined his invasion of Raoul's lands in November 1091. Lord William's capture in 1092 doomed Count William's cause. His ransom amounted to 3000 livres (about 300 kilograms or 660 pounds of fine silver) and the recognition of Raoul's son Roger as heir to both Lord William and Count William. Roger, however, died young and the issue became moot.

Lord William was present at the hunt in the New Forest (probably near Brockenhurst) where William Rufus was killed by an arrow through his lung. He attempted to defend the crown jewels in the Winchester treasury against Prince Henry in deference to the claims of his duke Robert but was forced to yield. Henry, supported by other nobles against his "foreign" brother, was crowned king shortly afterwards at London.

William of Breteuil was married to Adeline of Montfort but is only known to have had two illegitimate children. His son Eustace of Breteuil (Eustace de Breteuil) succeeded him as lord of Breteuil and married Juliane de Fontevrault, the illegitimate daughter of King Henry I of England. His daughter Isabel of Breteuil (Isabel de Breteuil) was sought by Ascelin Gouel, Lord of Ivry, who captured William and tortured him until he finally permitted Isabel's marriage.

William died at Bec Abbey in Normandy on 12 January 1103. He was succeeded by his son Eustace in preference to his legal heirs William of Gael and Reginald of Grancey as his Norman subjects "chose to be ruled by a fellow countryman who was a bastard rather than by a legitimate Breton or Burgundian".
