= Claudius Pontificals =

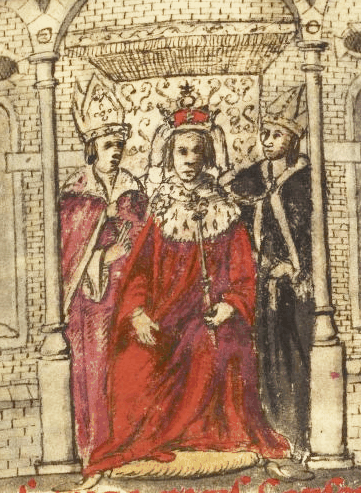
The opening page of Claudius Pontifical III (fol. 19) was decorated with a drawing of the coronation of Henry I by a later hand.

The so-called Claudius Pontificals are the texts in British Library, Cotton Claudius A.iii, a composite manuscript of three separate pontificals, i.e. compilations of the services reserved for bishops, especially the coronation of kings. The first two date to the 11th century, the third to the 12th century.

- foll. 4-6, formerly bound with the Coronation Gospels (British Library, Cotton MS Tiberius A.ii), contain the "Æthelred confirmation" and the "Edward the Confessor confirmation".
- Claudius Pontifical I, foll. 31-86, 106-150 (original page order 31-38, 106-136, 39-86, 137-150); this early 11th-century book was owned by Wulfstan (died 1023); on fol. 31 a commemorative verse in Old English, informing us that this halungboc was bound at the expense of one Thureth, presumably a Northumbrian earl;
- Claudius Pontifical II, foll. 9-18, 87-105, mid 11th century, contains the Second Anglo-Saxon Ordo;
- Claudius Pontifical III, foll. 19-29, consists of the Third English Coronation Order (coronation of Henry I, 5 August 1100), early to mid 12th century.

The manuscript on fol. 7 contains the original Latin form of the coronation oath of the English kings (attributed in a later hand to the coronation of Æthelred II, AD 978).
