= Sybilla of Normandy =

Queen of Scotland c. 1107–1122

Queen consort of Alba (Scotland)
- Tenure: c. 1107–1122
- Born: c. 1092; Domfront, Normandy
- Died: 12 or 13 July 1122; Kenmore, Scotland
- Burial: Dunfermline Abbey
- Spouse: Alexander I of Scotland
- Dynasty: Norman
- Father: Henry I of England
- Mother: Sybilla Corbet of Alcester

Sybilla of Normandy (c. 1092 – 12 or 13 July 1122) was Queen of Alba as the wife of King Alexander I.

Sybilla was the first child of Henry I of England and his mistress, Sybilla Corbet of Alcester. Her maternal grandfather was Robert Corbet of Alcester, part of the Corbet family. She was born circa 1092 in Domfront, Normandy.

Around 1107, Sybilla married Alexander I, King of Scotland. The marriage was childless. The marriage ceremony may have occurred as early as 1107 or as late as 1114.

William of Malmesbury's account attacks Sybilla, but the evidence argues that Alexander and Sybilla were a devoted but childless couple, and Sybilla was of noteworthy piety. Sybilla died in unrecorded circumstances at Eilean nam Ban (Kenmore on Loch Tay) in July 1122 and was buried at Dunfermline Abbey. Alexander did not remarry and Walter Bower wrote that he planned an Augustinian Priory at the Eilean nam Ban dedicated to Sybilla's memory, and he may have taken steps to have her venerated.

Scottish royalty
Preceded by Ethelreda of Northumbria	Queens consort of Scotland c. 1107–1122	Succeeded by Maud, Countess of Huntingdon
