= Horstead Priory =

Alien priory in Norfolk, England

Horstead Priory was a Benedictine alien house in Norfolk, England.

William II of England granted Horstead manor to the Abbey of Sainte-Trinité, in Caen, France, which had been founded by William's mother, Matilda of Flanders. Taxation records show that, in 1291, the revenue of the abbey and its estate was £20 10s. 6½d.

The priory was dissolved in 1414, along with a great many other alien priories, by Henry V, and the manor was granted for life to the soldier Thomas Erpingham. In 1431, a fear years after Erpingham's death, it was granted to King's College, Cambridge.

None of the medieval buildings are now extant.
