= Caen stone =

Limestone quarried near Caen, France

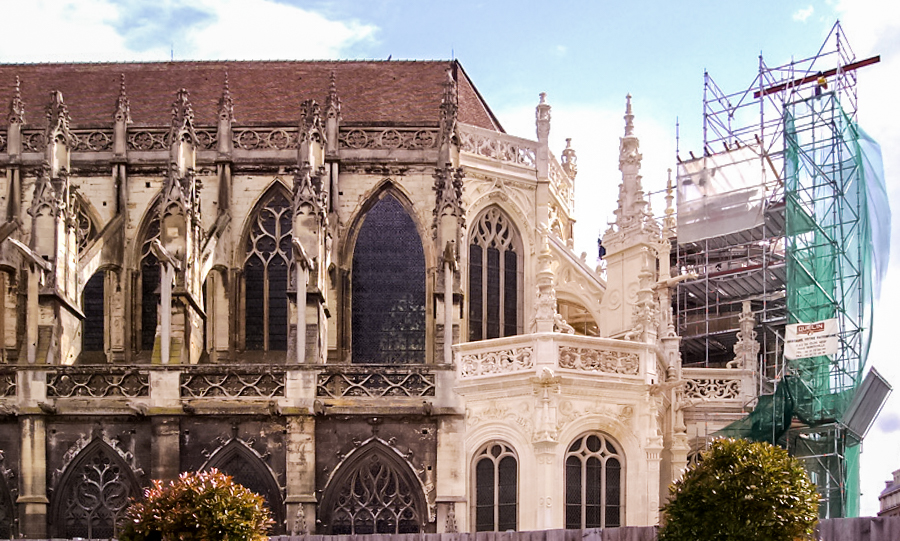
Church of Saint-Pierre, Caen. The restoration of the chevet shows the original colour of the stone.

Caen stone (French: Pierre de Caen) is a light creamy-yellow Jurassic limestone quarried in north-western France near the city of Caen. The limestone is a fine grained oolitic limestone formed in shallow water lagoons in the Bathonian Age about 167 million years ago. The stone is homogeneous, and therefore suitable for carving.

== Use in building ==
The stone was first used for building in the Gallo-Roman period with production from open cast quarries restarting in the 11th century. In England, Canterbury Cathedral, Westminster Abbey and the Tower of London were all partially built from imported Caen stone. Underground mining developed in the 19th century, but the stone trade declined in the 20th century, eventually ceasing in the 1960s. Excavation restarted in the 1980s with the stone being used for building the Caen Memorial. A 2004 decree by Caen city council authorised the annual quarrying of 9000 tonnes of stone.

=== Notable examples ===
- Caen stone was used in the construction of the late 11th-century austere Norman Romanesque Church of Saint-Étienne, at the Abbaye-aux-Hommes (on the east side of Caen), which was founded by William the Conqueror, whose tomb is located there.
- The Norman Romanesque Church of La Trinité, at the Abbaye-aux-Dames (on the west side of the city), was founded by William's wife, Matilda of Flanders. Her tomb is located there.
- Both abbeys in Caen were built with Caen stone in Norman Romanesque style, and both were unscathed by heavy aerial bombing in July 1944 that destroyed much of the city, as they were being used by the local populace to shelter from the air raids.
- Used by the Normans for the cathedral and castle in Norwich, where it was brought by boat up the River Wensum. Caen stone was also used extensively in Canterbury Cathedral. It was used by Henry I of England at Reading Abbey and fine examples of Romanesque sculpture in Caen stone are in the collection at the Museum of Reading. Perhaps the most famous Norman building that used Caen stone in its construction is the Tower of London.
- Caen stone continued to be a popular material in Britain after the Norman period. For example, it was used for parts of the 19th-century clock tower at the Palace of Westminster (Big Ben).
- The statues on the Martyrs' Memorial in Oxford are carved of Caen stone.
- Caen stone has also been exported to the United States, Bermuda, Canada and recently Saudi Arabia. The narthex screen on the east wall of the sanctuary at Old South Church in Boston, Massachusetts is built of Caen stone.

The high altar of St. Mary's Church in Dedham, Massachusetts is made of Caen stone.

== See also ==
- List of types of limestone – Limestone deposits listed by location
