= Church of Saint-Étienne-le-Vieux =

Saint-Étienne-le-Vieux
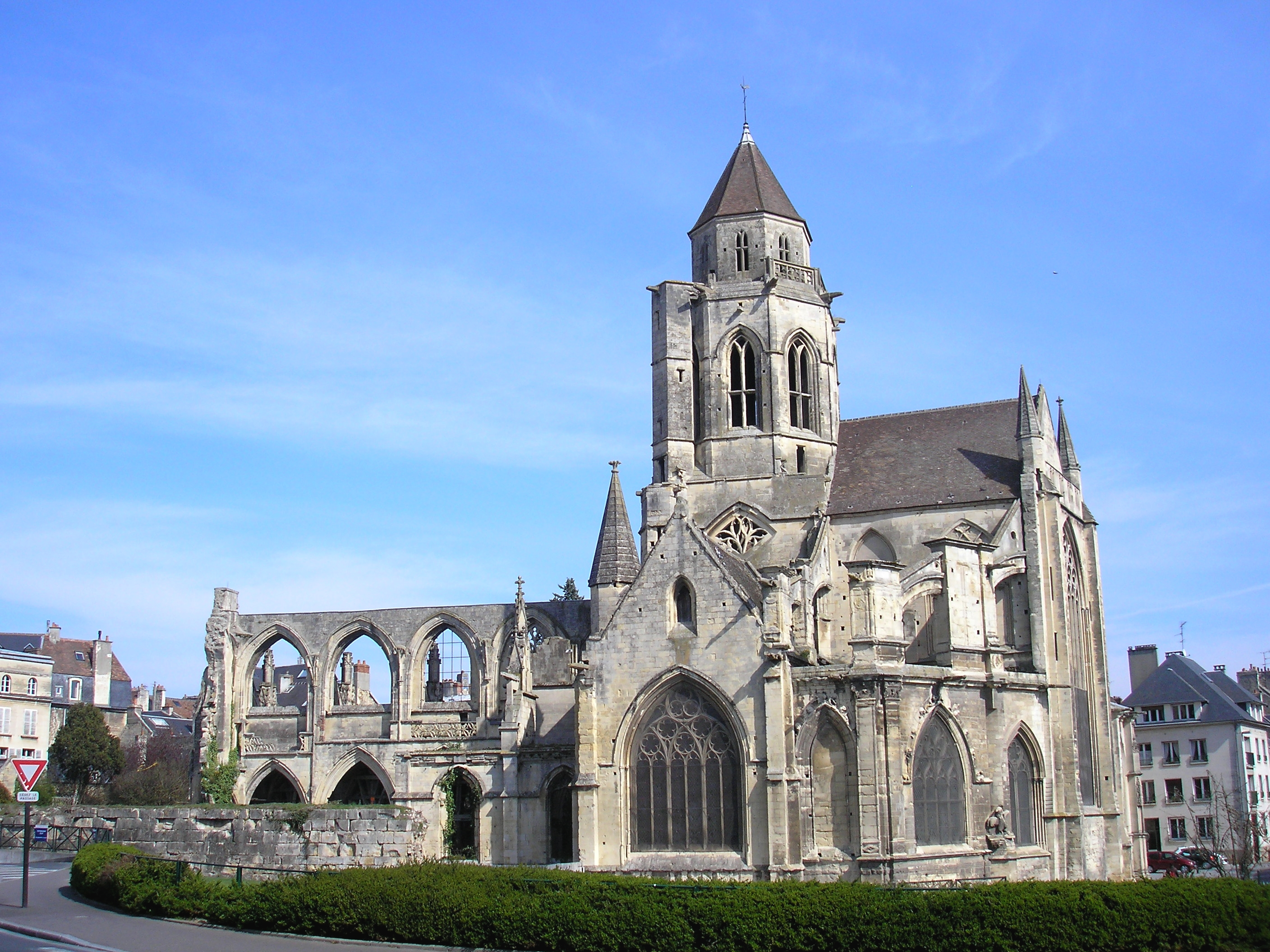
- Church of Saint-Étienne-le-Vieux
- Saint-Étienne-le-Vieux
- 49.1812546°N 0.3694153°W
- Location: Caen
- Country: France
- Denomination: Catholic

Architecture
- Functional status: church
- Heritage designation: 1903
- Style: Gothic
- Years built: 1067
- Completed: 15th century

Administration
- Province: Calvados

The Church of Saint-Étienne-le-Vieux ("Old Saint Stephen's") is a former Catholic church, today partly ruined, located in the old city of Caen, Calvados, France. It is not to be confused with the nearby Church of Saint-Étienne, the former church of the Abbaye aux Hommes. This church has been classified as a monument historique since August 22, 1903.

== History ==
The church was probably founded during the 10th century when the city of Caen began its first significant growth. It is mentioned for the first time in the charters granted by William the Conqueror to the two abbeys of Caen under the name of sanctus Stephanus Vetus in around 1067. The qualifier "old" distinguishes it from the church of the Abbey of Saint-Étienne, Caen (the Abbaye aux Hommes), under construction from the 11th century.

Because of its exposed position along the ramparts of the city, the church was badly damaged during the Hundred Years' War, particularly during the Siege of Caen in 1417. It was reconstructed during and after the English occupation. The octagonal lantern tower dates from this time.

The parish was part of the deanery of Caen in the former diocese of Bayeux.

The church was decommissioned in 1793, and not reinstated for worship in 1802, when the former abbey church took over the role of parish church. Poorly maintained, the church soon began to fall into ruin. It was registered in 1840 as a monument historique, but closed to the public in 1844 because of its state of decay. Threatened with demolition, it was saved at the very last minute thanks to the action of Arcisse de Caumont and Antoine Charma. The Society of Antiquaries of Normandy envisaged using the church for the installation of its collections, but the Museum of the Antiquaries of Normandy (Musée des antiquaires de Normandie) was finally housed in the former Collège du Mont located nearby. The city authorities used the church to store architectural fragments until their transfer to the museum in 1926.

In 1944, it was hit by a shell aimed at a column of German tanks which was parked in the vicinity. The nave was largely destroyed. Since that time the church has not been the object of restoration work and in its state of disrepair is not open to the public.

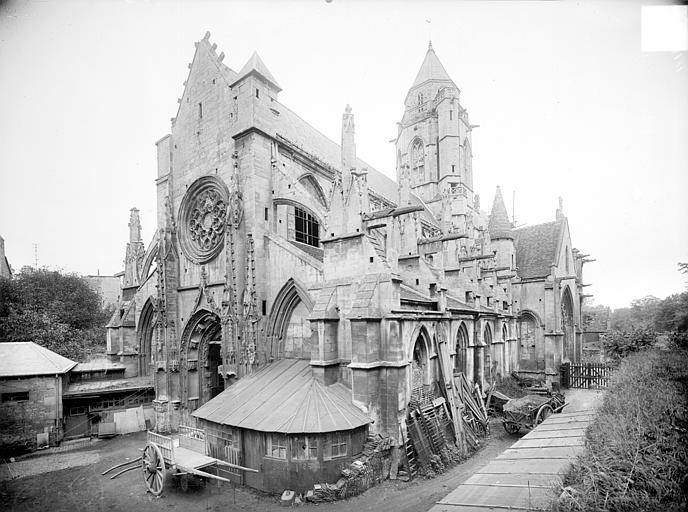
General view

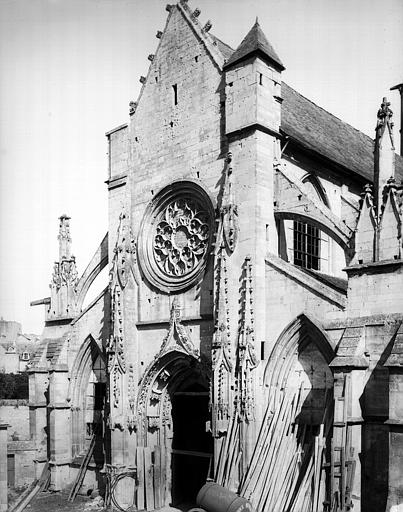
Main portal

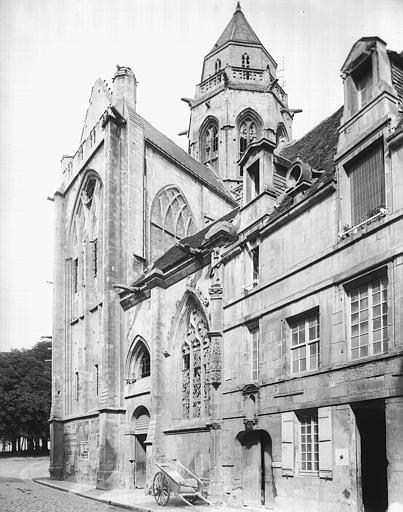
The chevet on the Rue Arcisse-de-Caumont

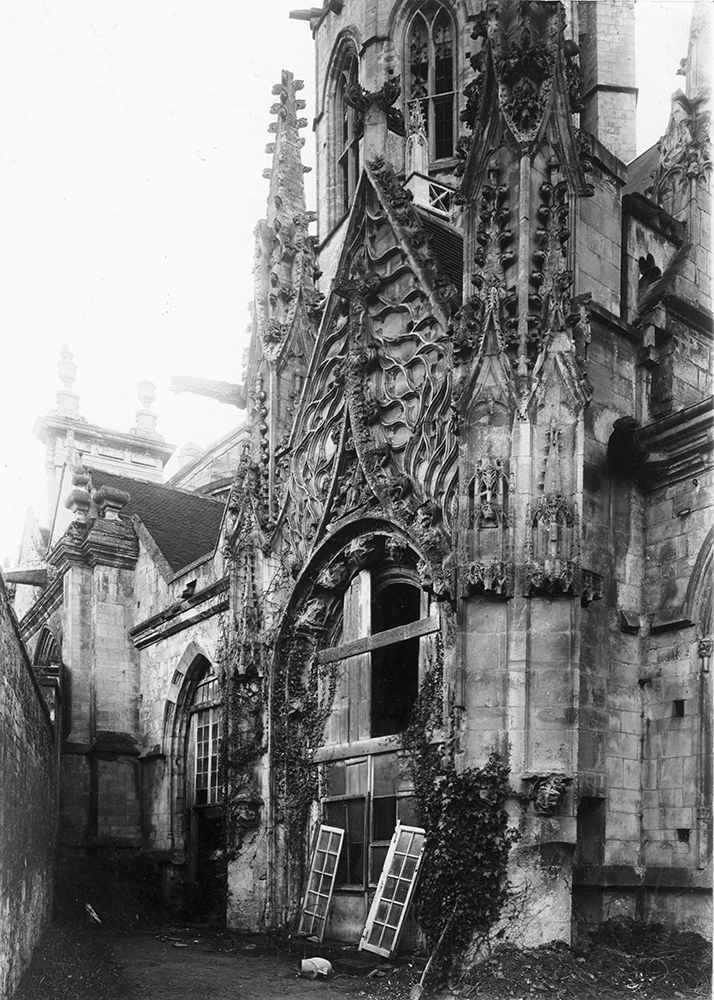
19th-century photograph of the church
