= Richard of Normandy =

Richard of Normandy may refer to:

- Richard I of Normandy, "the Fearless", count (942–996)
- Richard II of Normandy, "the Good", duke (996–1026)
- Richard (son of William the Conqueror), called "Duke of Bernay" (c. 1054–c. 1070)
