= Abbey of Saint-Étienne, Caen =

Benedictine abbey in Caen, France

Coordinates: 49°10′54″N 0°22′22″W

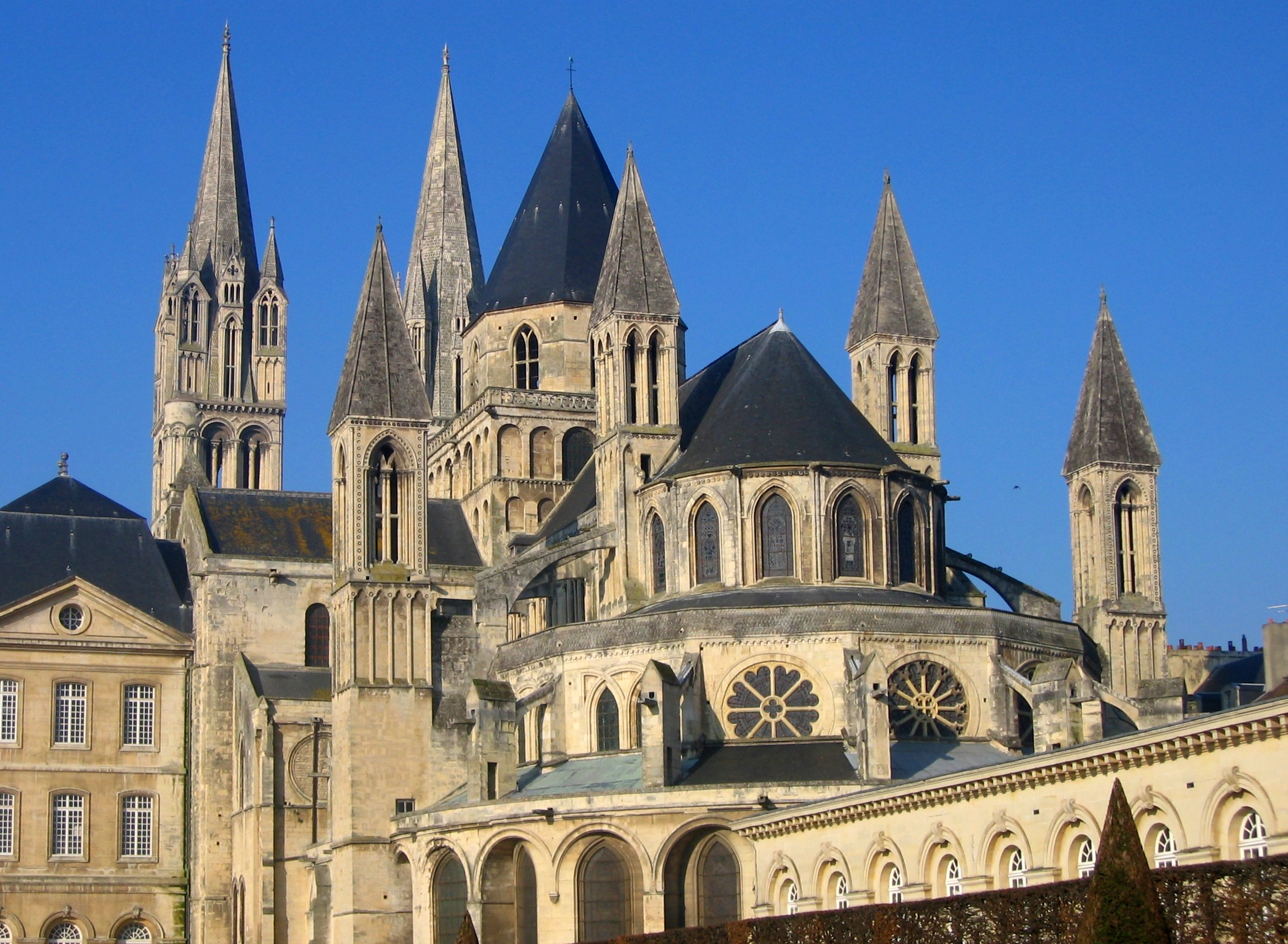
Abbaye aux Hommes

The Abbey of Saint-Étienne, also known as Abbaye aux Hommes (French pronunciation: [abei oz‿ɔm], "Men's Abbey") by contrast with the Abbaye aux Dames ("Ladies' Abbey"), is a former Benedictine monastery in the French city of Caen, Normandy, dedicated to Saint Stephen. It was founded in 1063 by William the Conqueror and is one of the most important Romanesque buildings in Normandy.

== Founding ==
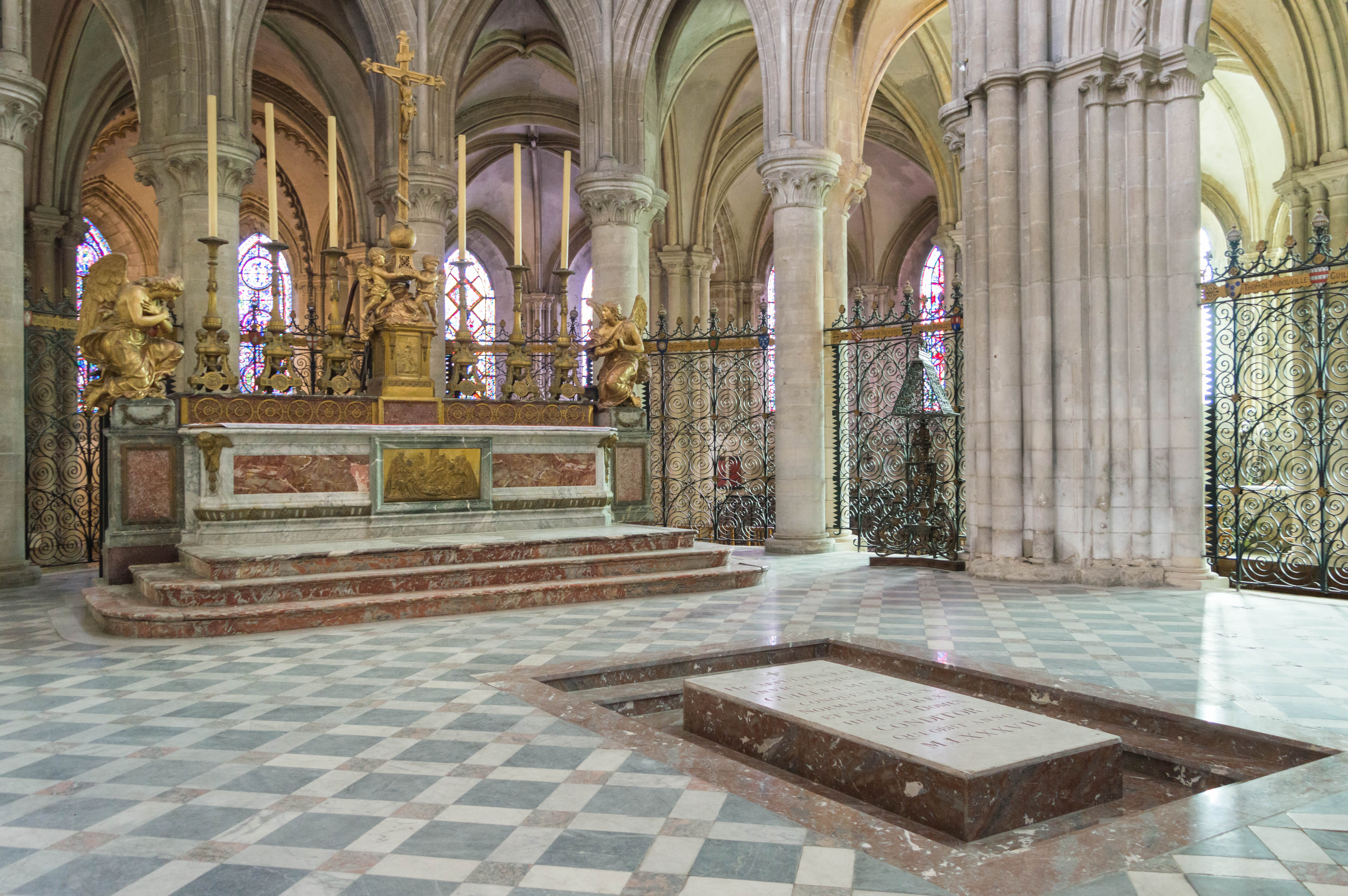
Tomb of William the Conqueror (d.1087)

The concurrent founding of the Abbey of Saint-Étienne to the west of the Caen Castle and the Abbey of Sainte-Trinité (Abbaye aux Dames) to its East were to enhance the development of the new ducal capital, and may have been a result of the reconciliation process of William, Duke of Normandy (soon after to become William I, King of England), and Pope Leo IX. William fell out with the pope when he married his cousin Matilda of Flanders after 1049 despite Leo's interdiction. Lanfranc of Pavia, Prior of Bec Abbey, who himself had initially expressed concerns regarding the marriage, acted on William's behalf to secure Leo's forgiveness. For this successful service, Lanfranc was made abbot of Saint-Étienne, a position he held until his appointment to Canterbury in 1070.

It was also a part of a wider programme of monastic reform in Normandy. The dedication took place in 1077.

== Tomb of William the Conqueror ==
William's wife Matilda died in 1083 and was buried in the Abbaye aux Dames. After his own death in 1087 in Rouen, the body of King William was taken to Caen to be buried in Saint-Étienne, according to his wishes. The funeral, attended by the bishops and abbots of Normandy as well as by his son Henry, was disturbed by the assertion of a citizen of Caen who alleged that his family had been illegally despoiled of the land on which the church was built. After hurried consultations the allegation was shown to be true, and the man was compensated. A further indignity occurred when the corpse was lowered into the tomb. The corpse was too large for the space, and when attendants forced the body into the tomb it burst, spreading a disgusting odour throughout the church.

William's tomb has been disturbed several times since 1087, the first time in 1522 when the grave was opened on orders from the papacy. The intact remains were restored to the tomb at that time. In 1562, during the French Wars of Religion, the grave was again opened and the original tombstone of black marble, similar to that of Matilda in the Abbaye aux Dames, was destroyed. William's bones were scattered and lost, with the exception of one thigh bone. This was reburied in 1642 with a new marker, which was replaced 100 years later with a more elaborate monument. That tomb was again destroyed during the French Revolution, but was eventually replaced with the current early 19th-century ledger stone in white marble.

== Architecture ==
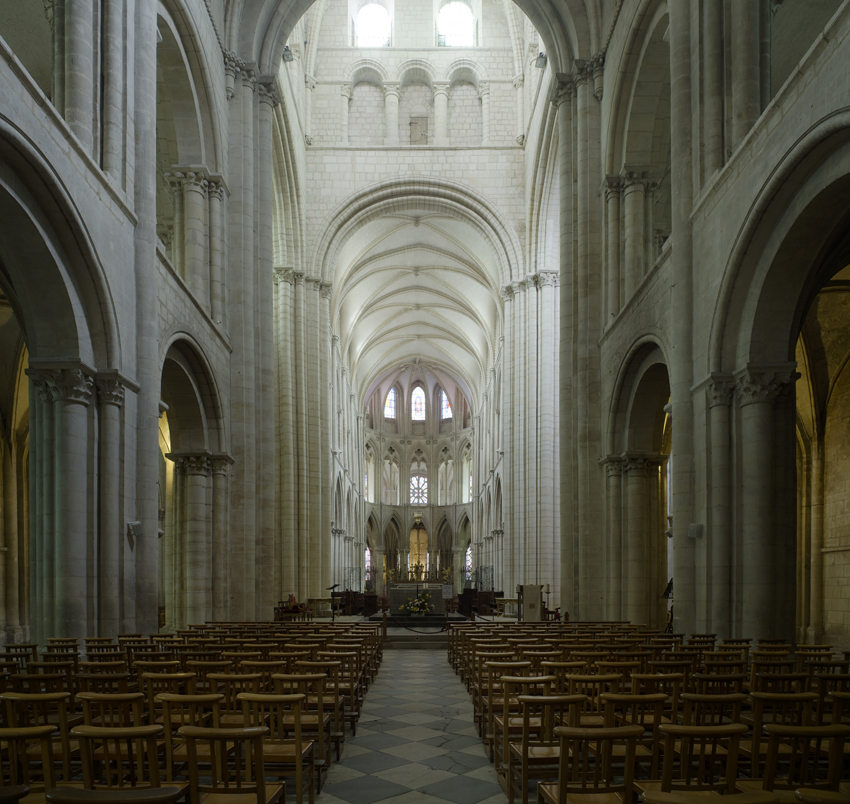
Interior view of St.-Étienne

The abbey was to be built in Caen stone, and construction began in 1066. For many decades during the 11th century, there was a mutually fruitful competition between Saint-Étienne and its sister building Sainte-Trinité. The west façade was built at the end of the 11th century.

An important feature added to both churches in about 1120 was the ribbed vault, used for the first time in France. The two abbey churches are considered forerunners of the Gothic. The original Romanesque apse was replaced in 1166 by an early Gothic chevet, complete with rose windows and flying buttresses. Nine towers and spires were added in the 13th century. The interior vaulting shows a similar progression, beginning with early sexpartite vaulting (using circular ribs) in the nave and progressing to quadripartite vaults (using pointed ribs) in the sanctuary.

== Later history ==
During the French Wars of Religion (1562-1598), the abbey sustained severe damage from French iconoclasts. During the fighting, which was targeted at religious sites, the abbey was looted and abandoned, and the high lantern tower in the church's center collapsed and was never rebuilt.

Later, during the French Revolution, monastic life was terminated, abbey property was nationalized, and religious vows were abolished. As a result of the suppression of the Benedictine abbey, it became a parish church in 1790.

From 1804 to 1961, the abbey buildings accommodated a prestigious high school, the Lycée Malherbe. During the Normandy Landings, inhabitants of Caen found refuge in the church; on the rooftop there was a red cross, made with blood on a sheet, to show that it was a hospital in order to avoid bombings.

== See also ==
- French Romanesque architecture
