= William II of England =

King of England from 1087 to 1100

William II
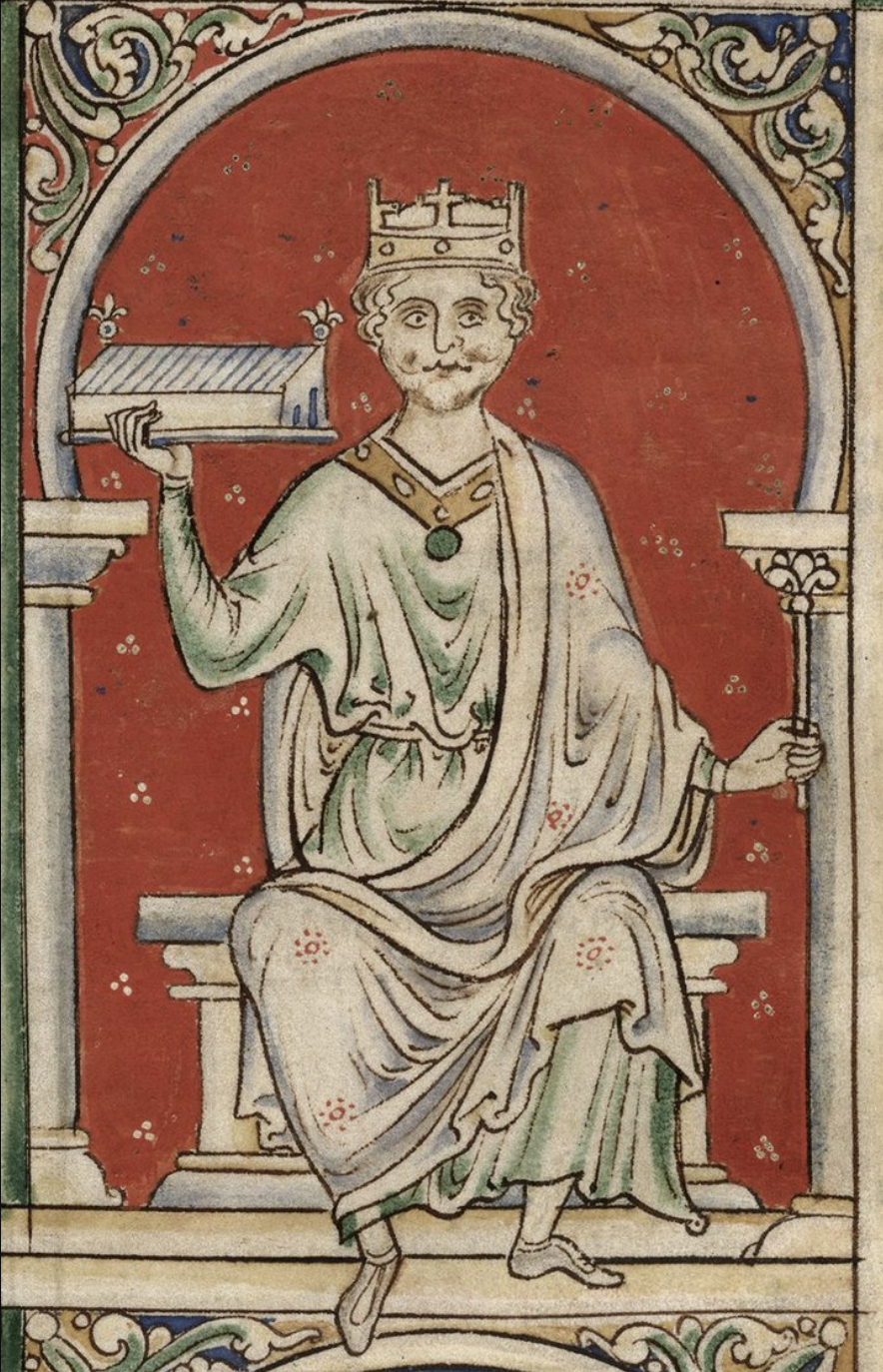
- Miniature from Matthew Paris's Historia Anglorum, c. 1253

King of England
- Reign: 1087–1100
- Coronation: 26 September 1087
- Predecessor: William I
- Successor: Henry I
- Born: c. 1057; Duchy of Normandy
- Died: 2 August 1100 (aged approximately 43–44); New Forest, Hampshire, England
- Burial: Winchester Cathedral
- House: Normandy
- Father: William the Conqueror
- Mother: Matilda of Flanders

William II (Anglo-Norman: Williame; c. 1057 – 2 August 1100) was King of England from 26 September 1087 until his death in 1100, with powers over Normandy and influence in Scotland. He was less successful in extending his control into Wales. The third son of William the Conqueror, he is commonly referred to as William Rufus (Rufus being Latin for 'the Red'), perhaps because of his ruddy appearance or, more likely, because he had red hair.

William was a figure of complex temperament, capable of both bellicosity and flamboyance. He did not marry or have children, which – along with contemporary accounts – has led some historians to speculate on his sexuality. He died after being hit by an arrow while hunting. Circumstantial evidence in the behaviour of those around him – including his younger brother Henry I – raises strong but unproven suspicions of murder. Upon William's death, Henry immediately seized the treasury and had himself crowned king.

Historian Frank Barlow writes that William was a "rumbustious, devil-may-care soldier, without natural dignity or social graces, with no cultivated tastes and little show of conventional religious piety or morality – indeed, according to his critics, addicted to every kind of vice, particularly lust and especially sodomy." On the other hand, he was a wise ruler and victorious general, Barlow writes: "His chivalrous virtues and achievements were all too obvious. He had maintained good order and satisfactory justice in England and restored good peace to Normandy. He had extended Anglo-Norman rule in Wales, brought Scotland firmly under his lordship, recovered Maine, and kept up the pressure on the Vexin."

== Early years ==
William's date of birth is not known, but according to historian Frank Barlow it occurred by 1060. He was the third of four sons born to William the Conqueror and Matilda of Flanders, the eldest being Robert Curthose, the second Richard, and the youngest Henry. Richard died around 1075 while hunting in the New Forest. William succeeded to the throne of England on his father's death in 1087, but Robert inherited Normandy.

William had five or six sisters. The existence of sisters Adeliza and Matilda is not absolutely certain, but four sisters are more securely attested:

- Adela, who married Stephen, Count of Blois;
- Cecily, who became a nun;
- Agatha, who died unmarried;
- Constance, who married Alan IV, Duke of Brittany.

Records indicate strained relations between the three surviving sons of William I. William's contemporary, chronicler Orderic Vitalis, wrote about an incident that took place at L'Aigle in Normandy in 1077 or 1078: William and Henry, having grown bored with casting dice, decided to make mischief by emptying a chamber pot onto their brother Robert from an upper gallery, thus infuriating and shaming him. A brawl broke out, and their father had to intercede to restore order. (Note: Barlow suggests that William and Henry probably urinated over Robert.)

According to William of Malmesbury, writing in the 12th century, William Rufus was "well set; his complexion florid, his hair yellow; of open countenance; different coloured eyes, varying with certain glittering specks; of astonishing strength, though not very tall, and his belly rather projecting."

== Reign ==
=== England and France ===
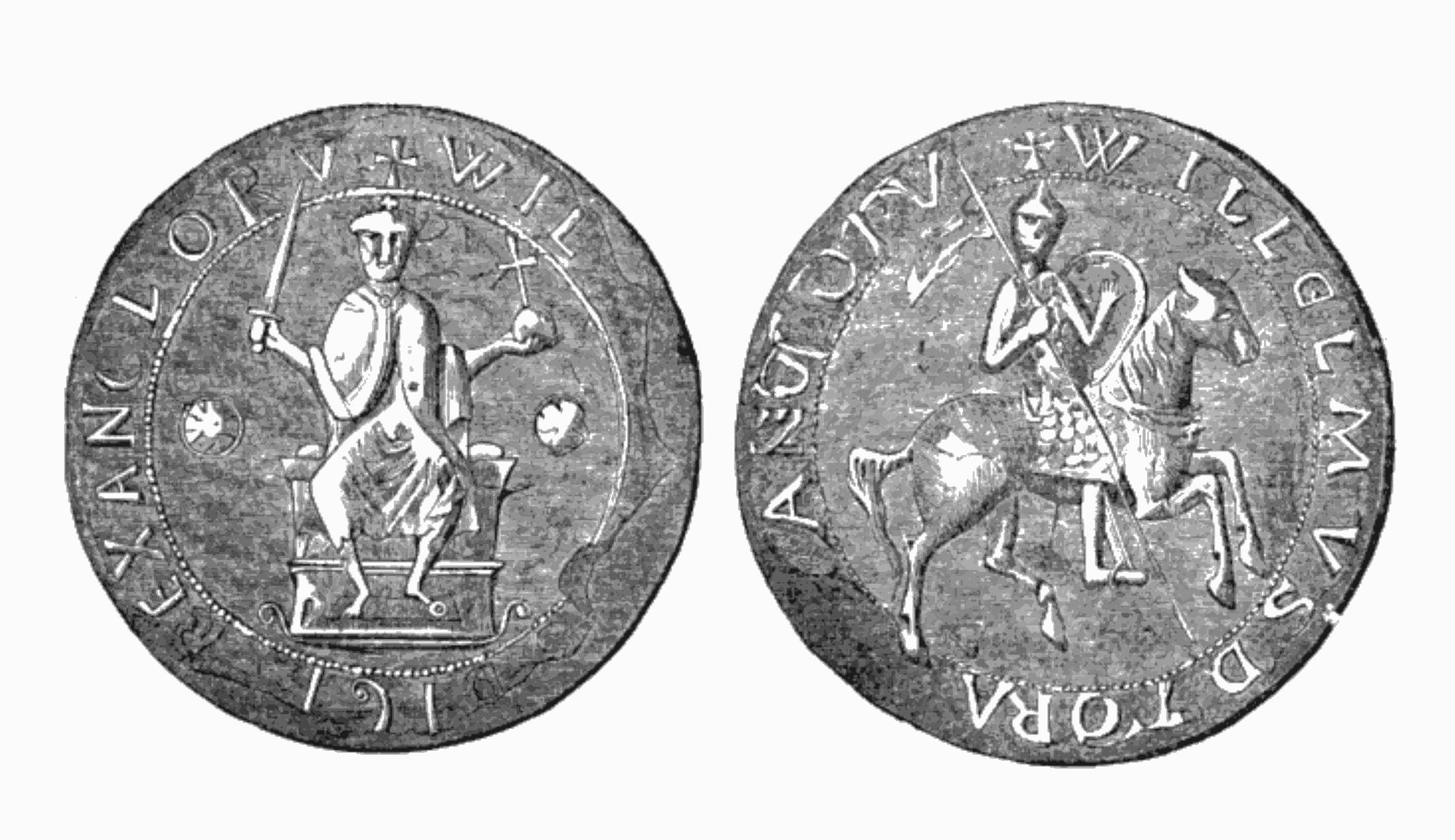
Engraving of the Great Seal of William II

The division of William the Conqueror's lands into two parts upon his death presented a dilemma for those nobles who held land on both sides of the English Channel. Since the younger William and his brother Robert were natural rivals, these nobles worried that they could not hope to please both of their lords and thus ran the risk of losing the favour of one ruler or the other, or both. The solution, as they saw it, was to unite England and Normandy once more under one ruler. The pursuit of this aim led them to revolt against William in favour of Robert in the Rebellion of 1088, under the leadership of the powerful Bishop Odo of Bayeux, who was a half-brother of William the Conqueror. As Robert failed to appear in England to rally his supporters, William won the support of the English with silver and promises of better government, and defeated the rebellion, thus securing his authority. In 1090, William decided to intervene in Normandy and started buying the allegiance of Norman barons in Upper Normandy, but his attempt to plot to take the city of Rouen in November that year failed. In 1091 he invaded Normandy, crushing Robert's forces and forcing him to cede a portion of his lands. The two made up their differences, and William agreed to help Robert recover lands lost to France, notably Maine. This plan was later abandoned, but William continued to pursue a ferociously warlike defence of his French possessions and interests to the end of his life, exemplified by his response to the attempt by Elias de la Flèche, Count of Maine, to take Le Mans in 1099.

William Rufus was thus secure in his kingdom. As in Normandy, his bishops and abbots were bound to him by feudal obligations, and his right of investiture in the Norman tradition prevailed within his kingdom during the age of the Investiture Controversy that brought excommunication upon the Salian Emperor Henry IV. The king's personal power, through an effective and loyal chancery, penetrated to the local level to an extent unmatched in France. The king's administration and law unified the realm, rendering him relatively impervious to papal condemnation. In 1097 he commenced the original Westminster Hall, built "to impress his subjects with the power and majesty of his authority".

=== Church and state ===
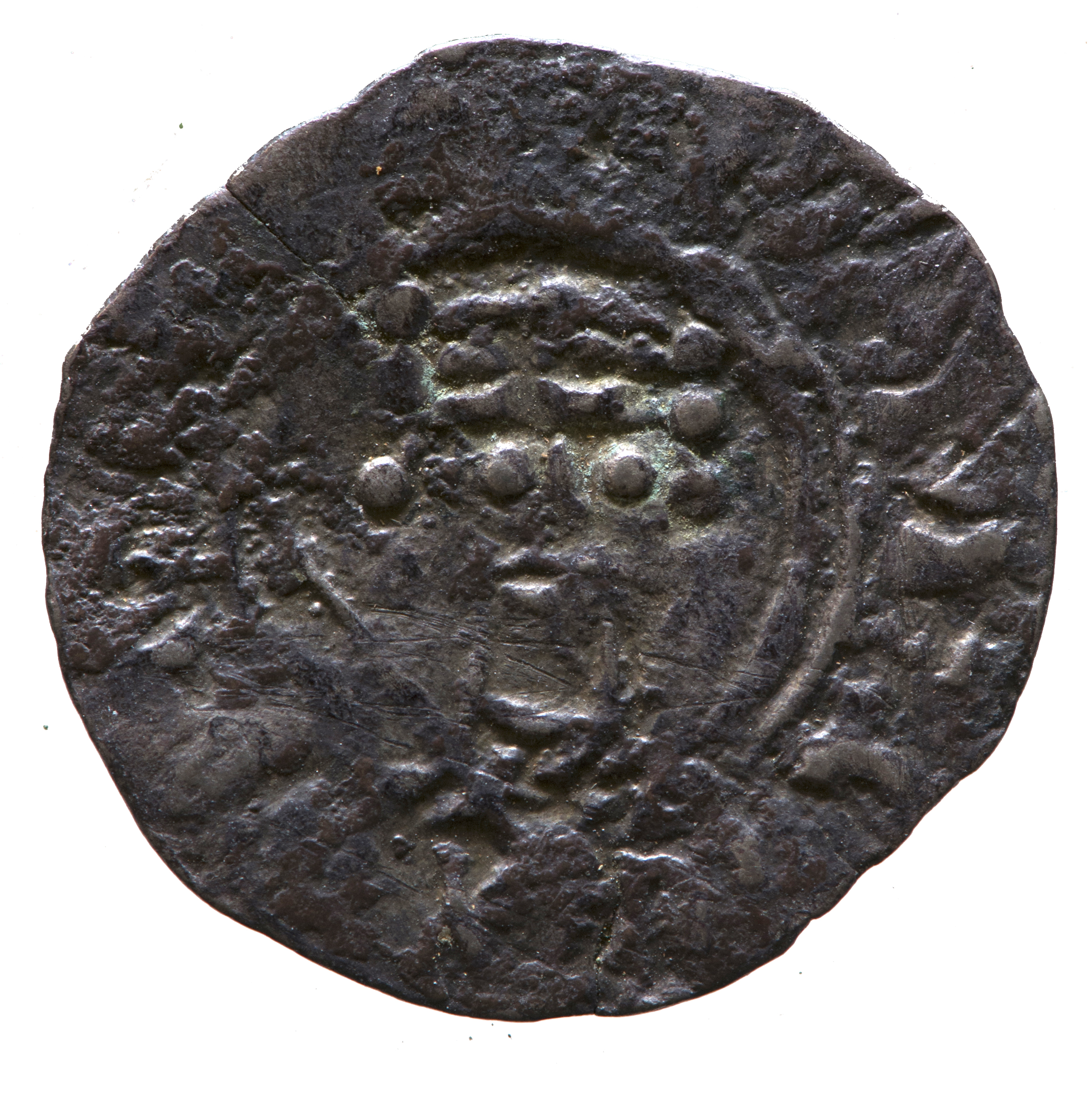
Silver penny of William II showing a crowned head facing forward (1089), Yorkshire Museum, York

Less than two years after becoming king, William II lost his father's adviser and confidant, the Italian-Norman Lanfranc, Archbishop of Canterbury who died in 1089. The king delayed appointing a new archbishop for many years, appropriating ecclesiastical revenues in the interim. In panic, owing to serious illness in 1093, William nominated as archbishop another Norman-Italian, Anselm – considered the greatest theologian of his generation – but this led to a long period of animosity between Church and State, Anselm being a stronger supporter of the Gregorian reforms in the Church than Lanfranc. William and Anselm disagreed on a range of ecclesiastical issues, in the course of which the king declared of Anselm, "Yesterday I hated him with great hatred, today I hate him with yet greater hatred and he can be certain that tomorrow and thereafter I shall hate him continually with ever fiercer and more bitter hatred."

The English clergy, beholden to the king for their preferments and livings, were unable to support Anselm publicly. In 1095 William called a council at Rockingham to bring Anselm to heel, but the archbishop remained firm. In October 1097, Anselm went into exile, taking his case to the pope. The diplomatic and flexible Pope Urban II was involved in a major conflict with Holy Roman Emperor Henry IV, who supported Antipope Clement III. Reluctant to make another enemy, Urban came to a concordat with William, whereby William recognised Urban as pope, and Urban gave sanction to the Anglo-Norman ecclesiastical status quo. Anselm remained in exile, and William was able to claim the revenues of the archbishop of Canterbury to the end of his reign.

However, this conflict was symptomatic of medieval English politics, as exemplified by the murder of Thomas Becket during the reign of the later Plantagenet King Henry II (his great-nephew through his brother Henry) and Henry VIII's actions centuries later, and as such should not be seen as a defect of William's reign in particular. (Note: According to Eadmer, an unusually well placed witness, William II "protested that Archbishop Anselm of Canterbury could not possibly keep at the same time both the allegiance which he owed to the King and obedience to the Apostolic See against the King's will." Anselm found himself in similar conflict with William II's successor, Henry I, as also reported by Eadmer.) Of course, contemporary churchmen were not above engaging in such politics: it is reported that when Archbishop Lanfranc suggested to William I that he imprison the rebellious Bishop Odo of Bayeux, he exclaimed "What! He is a clergyman." Lanfranc retorted "You will not seize the bishop of Bayeux, but confine the earl of Kent." (Odo held both titles.)

While there are complaints of contemporaries regarding William's personal behaviour, he was instrumental in assisting the foundation of Bermondsey Abbey, endowing it with the manor of Bermondsey, and it is reported that his "customary oath" was "By the Face at Lucca!". (Note: For a discussion of such blasphemous oaths, see Barlow 2000, pp. 116–118.)

=== War and rebellion ===
William Rufus inherited the Anglo-Norman settlement detailed in the Domesday Book of 1086, a survey undertaken at his father's command, essentially for the purposes of taxation, which was an example of the control of the English monarchy. If he was less effective than his father in containing the Norman lords' propensity for rebellion and violence, through charisma or political skills, he was forceful in overcoming the consequences. In 1095, Robert de Mowbray, the earl of Northumbria, refused to attend the Curia Regis, the thrice-annual court where the King announced his governmental decisions to the great lords. William led an army against Robert and defeated him. Robert was dispossessed and imprisoned, and another noble, William of Eu, accused of treachery, was blinded and castrated.

In external affairs, William had some successes. In 1091 he repulsed an invasion by King Malcolm III of Scotland, forcing Malcolm to pay homage. In 1092 he built Carlisle Castle, taking control of Cumberland and Westmorland, which had previously been claimed by the Scots. Subsequently, the two kings quarrelled over Malcolm's possessions in England, and Malcolm again invaded, ravaging Northumbria. At the Battle of Alnwick, on 13 November 1093, Malcolm was ambushed by Norman forces led by Robert de Mowbray. Malcolm and his son Edward were killed, and Malcolm's brother Donald seized the Scottish throne. William supported Malcolm's son Duncan II, who held power for a short time, and then another of Malcolm's sons, Edgar. Edgar conquered Lothian in 1094 and removed Donald in 1097 with William's aid in a campaign led by Edgar Ætheling. Edgar recognised William's authority over Lothian and attended William's court. William made two forays into Wales in 1097. Nothing decisive was achieved, but a series of castles were constructed as a marchland defensive barrier.

In 1096 Robert Curthose joined the First Crusade. He needed money to fund this venture and pledged his lands in Normandy to William in return for a payment of 10,000 marks, which equates to about a quarter of William's annual revenue. In a display of the effectiveness of English taxation, William raised the money by levying a special, heavy, and much-resented tax upon the whole of England. He then ruled Normandy as regent in Robert's absence. Robert returned in September 1100, one month after William's death. As regent in Normandy, William campaigned in France from 1097 to 1099. He secured northern Maine but failed to seize the French-controlled part of the Vexin region. According to chronicler William of Malmesbury he was planning to invade the Duchy of Aquitaine at the time of his death.

== Death ==
William went hunting on 2 August 1100 in the New Forest, probably near Brockenhurst, and was killed by an arrow through the lung, although the circumstances remain unclear. The earliest statement of the event was in the Anglo-Saxon Chronicle, which notes that the king was "shot by an arrow by one of his own men." Later chroniclers add the name of the killer, a nobleman named Walter Tirel, although the description of events was later embroidered with other details that may or may not be true. The first mention of any location more exact than the New Forest comes from John Leland, who wrote in 1530 that William died at Thorougham, a placename that is no longer used but that probably referred to a location on what is now Park Farm on the Beaulieu estates. A memorial stone in the grounds of Beaulieu Abbey, Hampshire, states "Remember King William Rufus who died in these parts then known as Truham whilst hunting on 2nd August 1100".

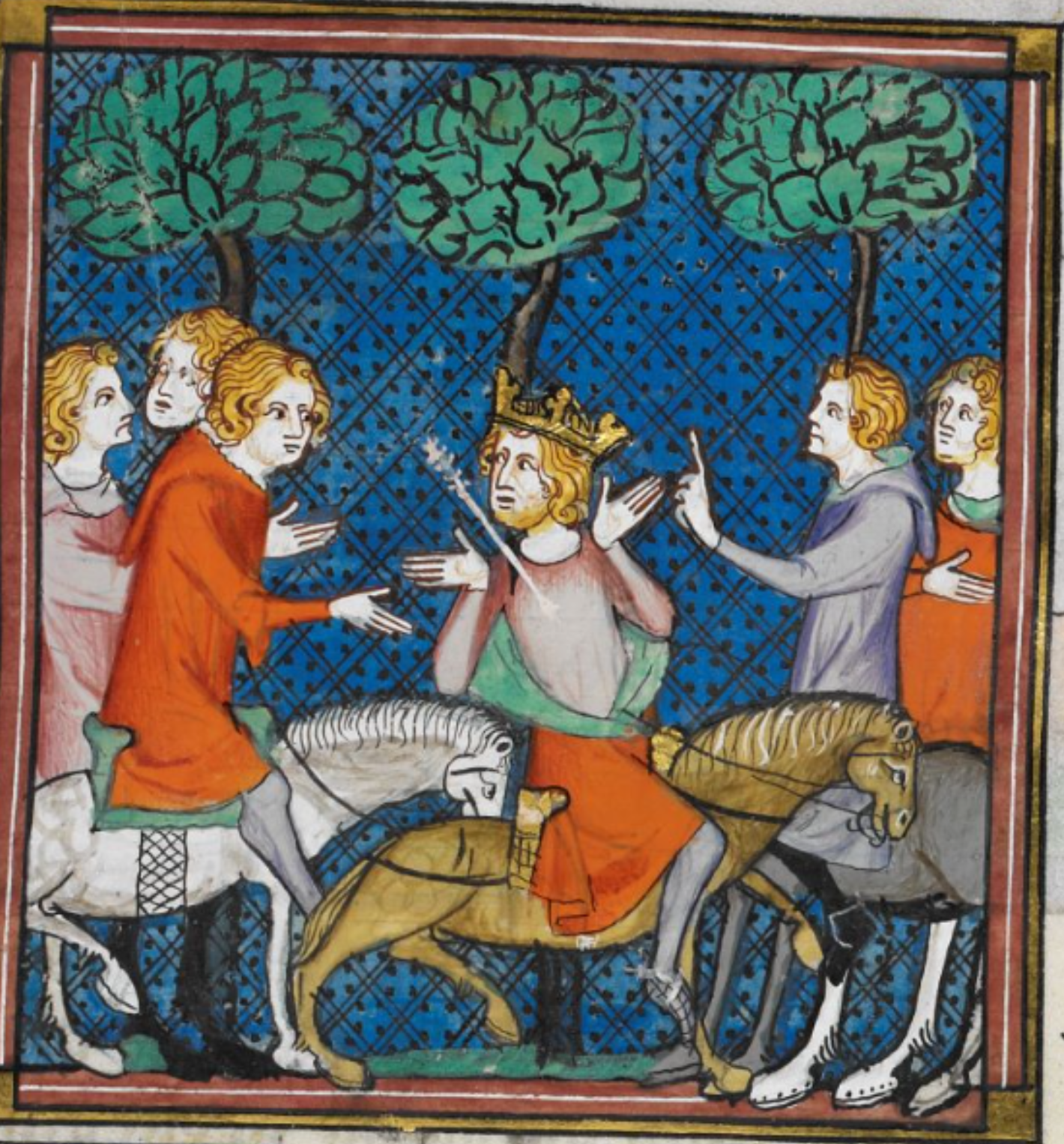
William's death in an illustration from the Grandes Chroniques de France (13th cent.)

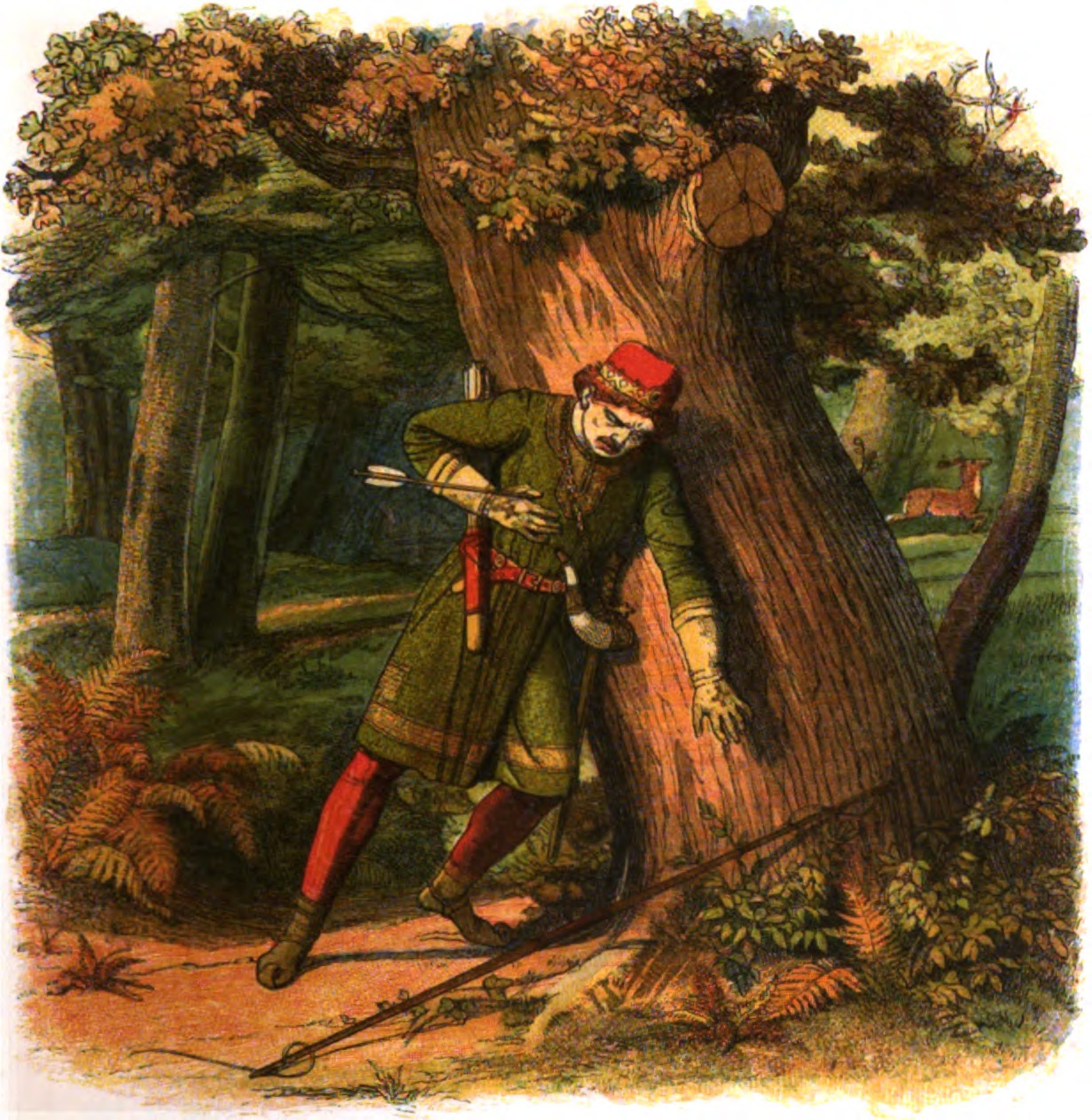
William's death from Doyle's English history (1864)

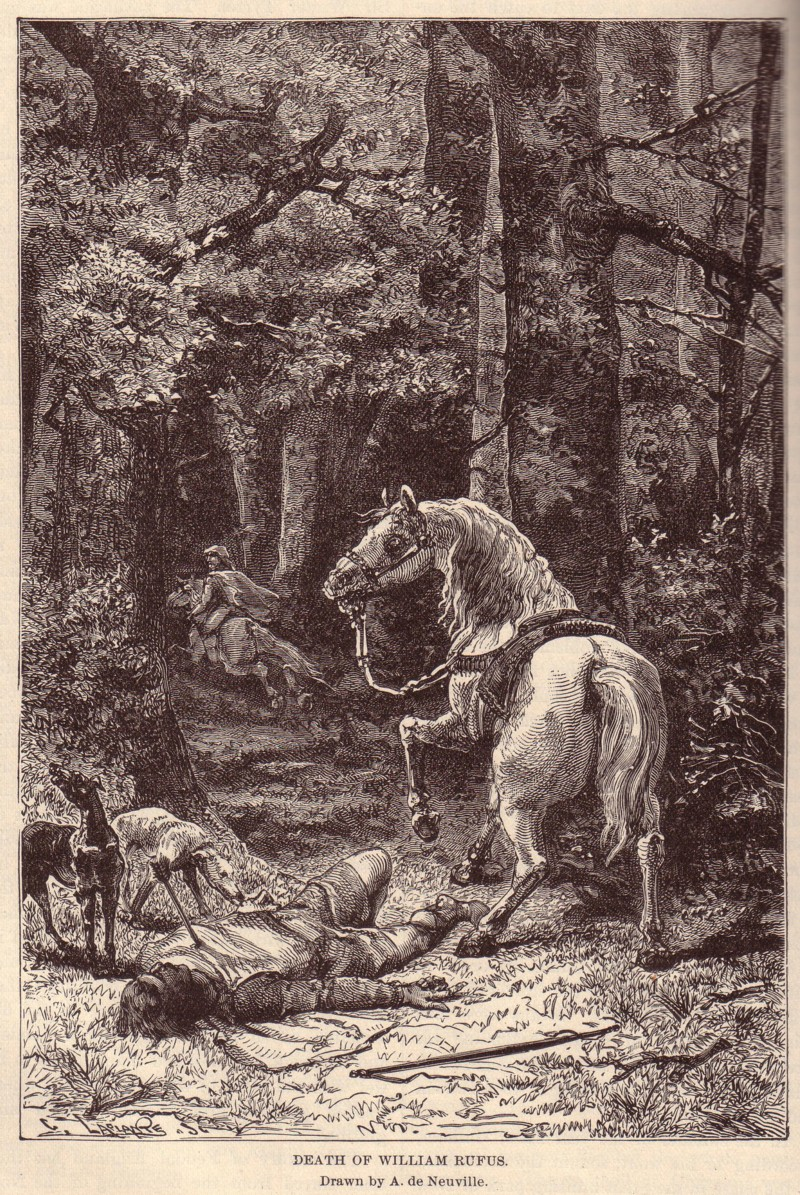
William's death from Ridpath's world history (1895)

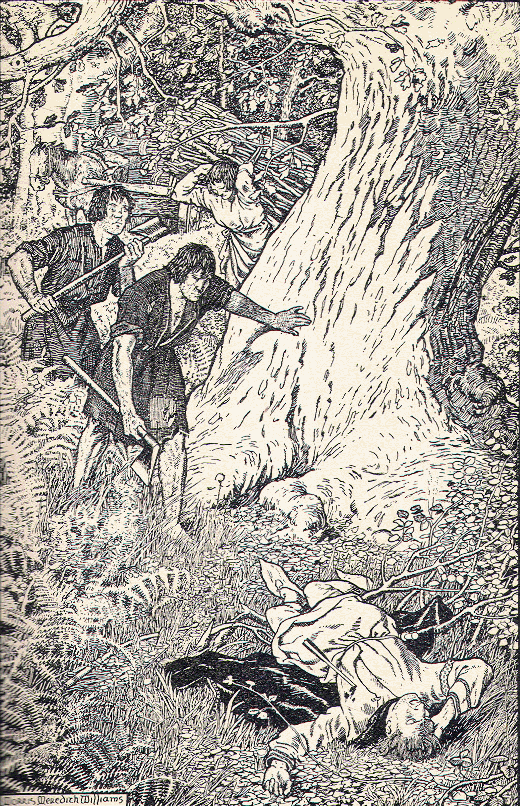
Morris Meredith Williams's illustration of the discovery of William's body (1915)

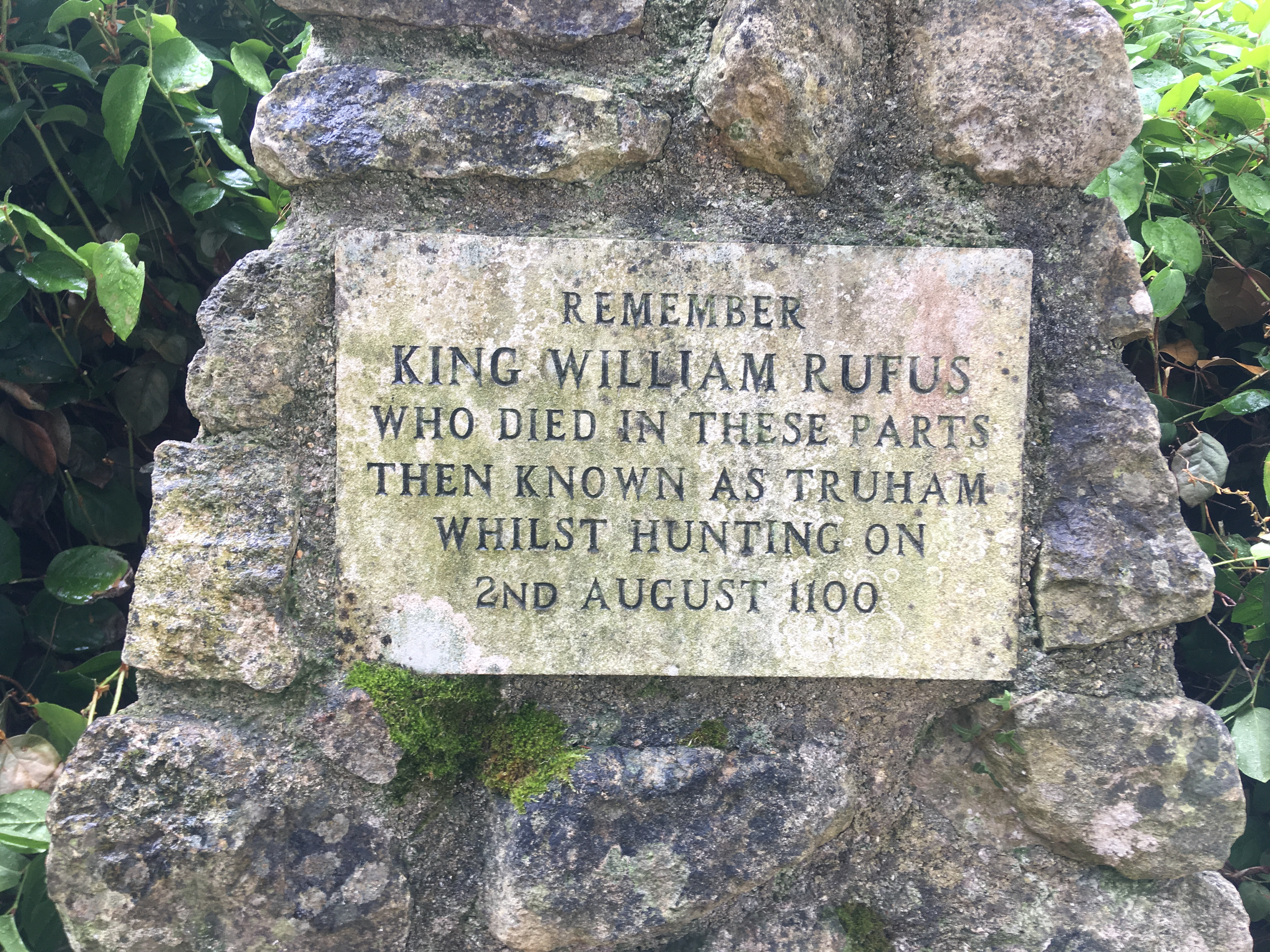
Memorial stone in the grounds of Beaulieu Abbey, Hampshire

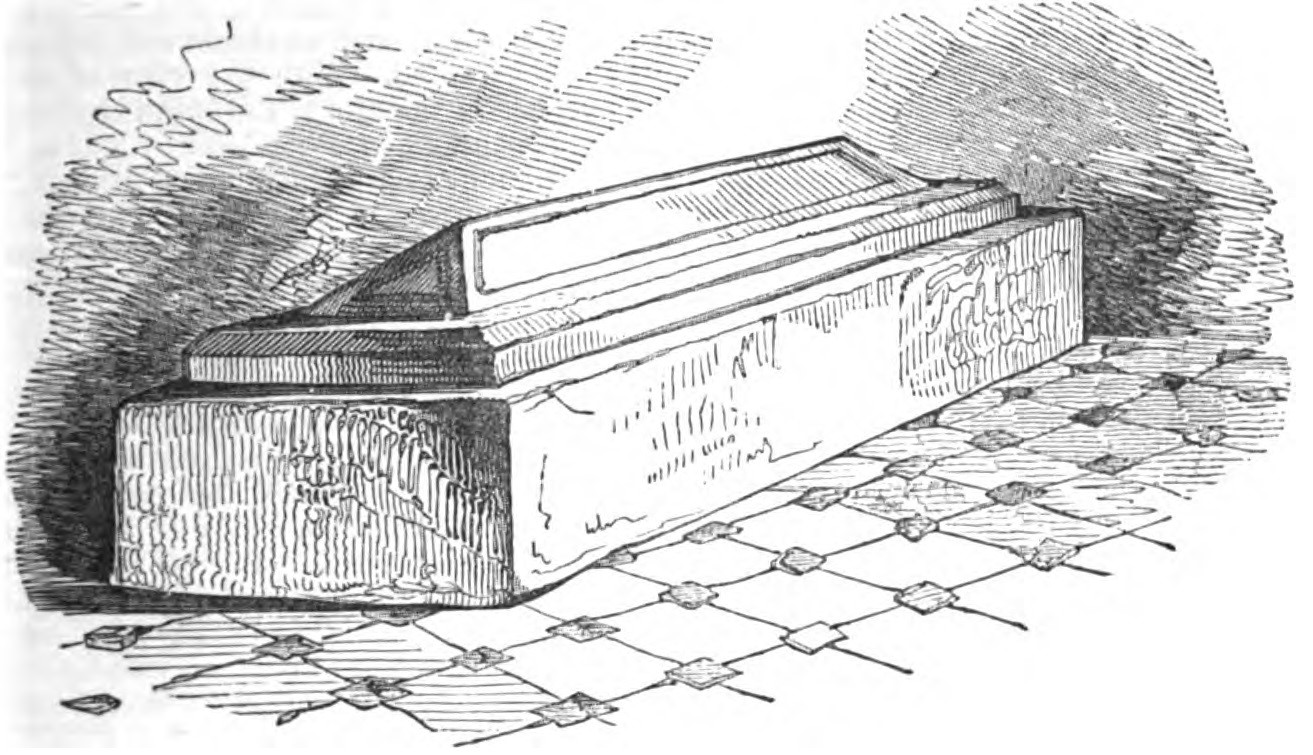
Tomb of William Rufus in Winchester Cathedral (1832)

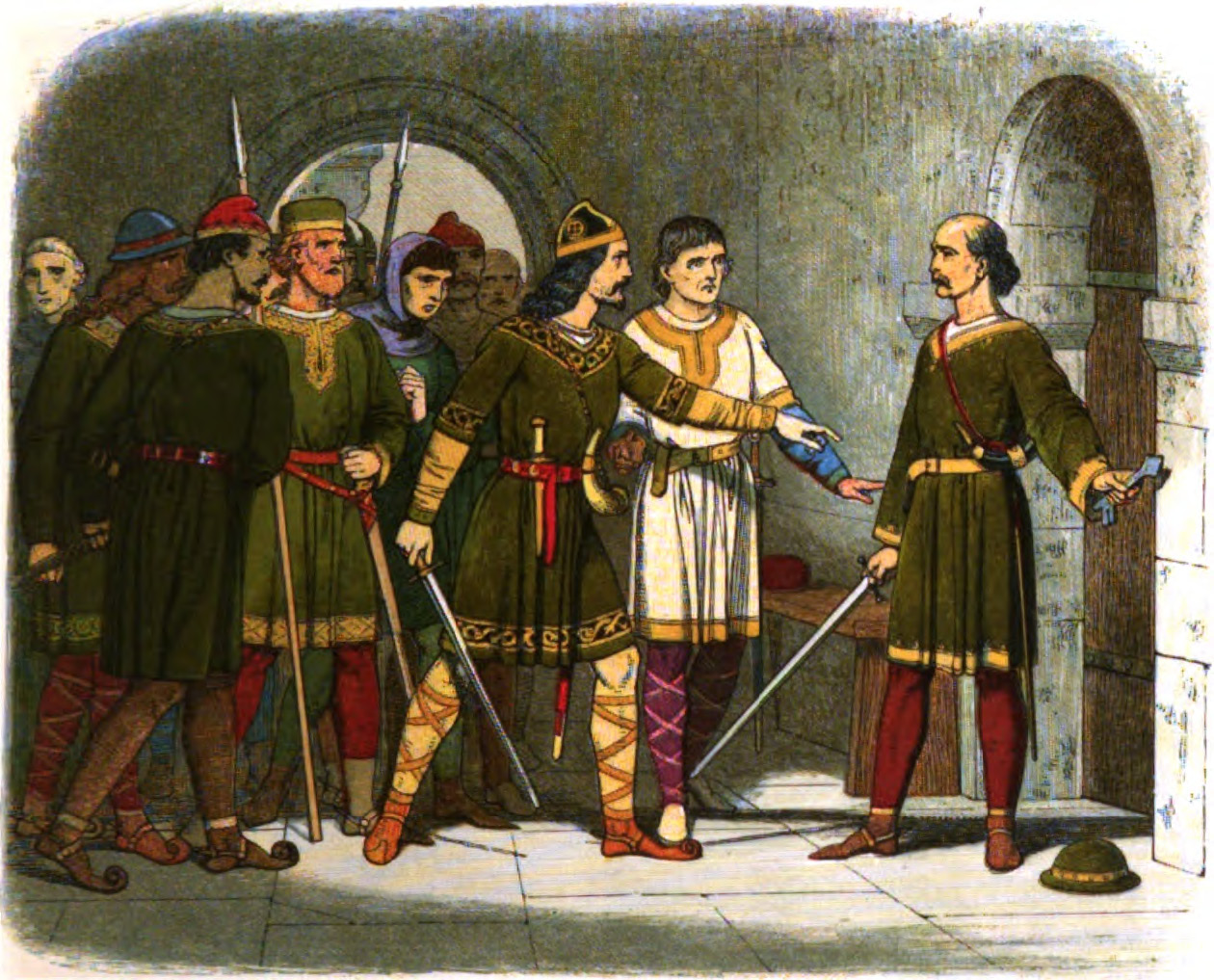
St William of Breteuil defending the Winchester treasury against Prince Henry at William's death

The king's body was abandoned by the nobles at the place where he fell. An arrow maker, Eli Parratt, later found the body. William's younger brother Henry hastened to Winchester to secure the royal treasury (initially defended by the Norman William of Breteuil in deference to the claims of Duke Robert), then to London, where he was crowned within days before either archbishop could arrive. William of Malmesbury states that the body was taken to Winchester Cathedral by a few countrymen, including Eli who discovered the body.

To the chroniclers, men of the Church, such an "act of God" was a just end for a wicked king and was regarded as a fitting demise for a ruler who came into conflict with the religious orders to which they belonged. Over the following centuries, the obvious suggestion that one of William's enemies had a hand in this event has repeatedly been made: chroniclers of the time point out that Tirel was renowned as a keen bowman and thus was unlikely to have loosed such an impetuous shot. Moreover, Bartlett says that rivalry between brothers was the pattern of political conflict in this period. Henry was among the hunting party that day and succeeded him as king.

Modern scholars have reopened the question, and some have found the assassination theory credible or compelling, but the theory is not universally accepted. Barlow says that accidents were common and there is not enough hard evidence to prove murder. Bartlett notes that hunting was dangerous. Poole says the facts "look ugly" and "seem to suggest a plot." John Gillingham points out that if Henry had planned to murder William it would have been in his interest to wait until a later time. It looked as though there would soon be a war between William and Robert, which would result in one of them being eliminated, thus opening the way for Henry to acquire both England and Normandy through a single assassination. Tirel fled immediately. Henry had the most to gain by William's death. Indeed, Henry's actions "seem to be premeditated: wholly disregarding his dead brother, he rode straight for Winchester, seized the treasury (always the first act of a usurping king), and the next day had himself elected."

William's remains are in Winchester Cathedral. The tomb long thought to be his is now thought to belong to William's nephew, Henry of Blois. Presently, his remains are scattered among royal mortuary chests positioned on the presbytery screen, flanking the choir. His skull appears to be missing, but some long bones may remain.

== Rufus Stone ==
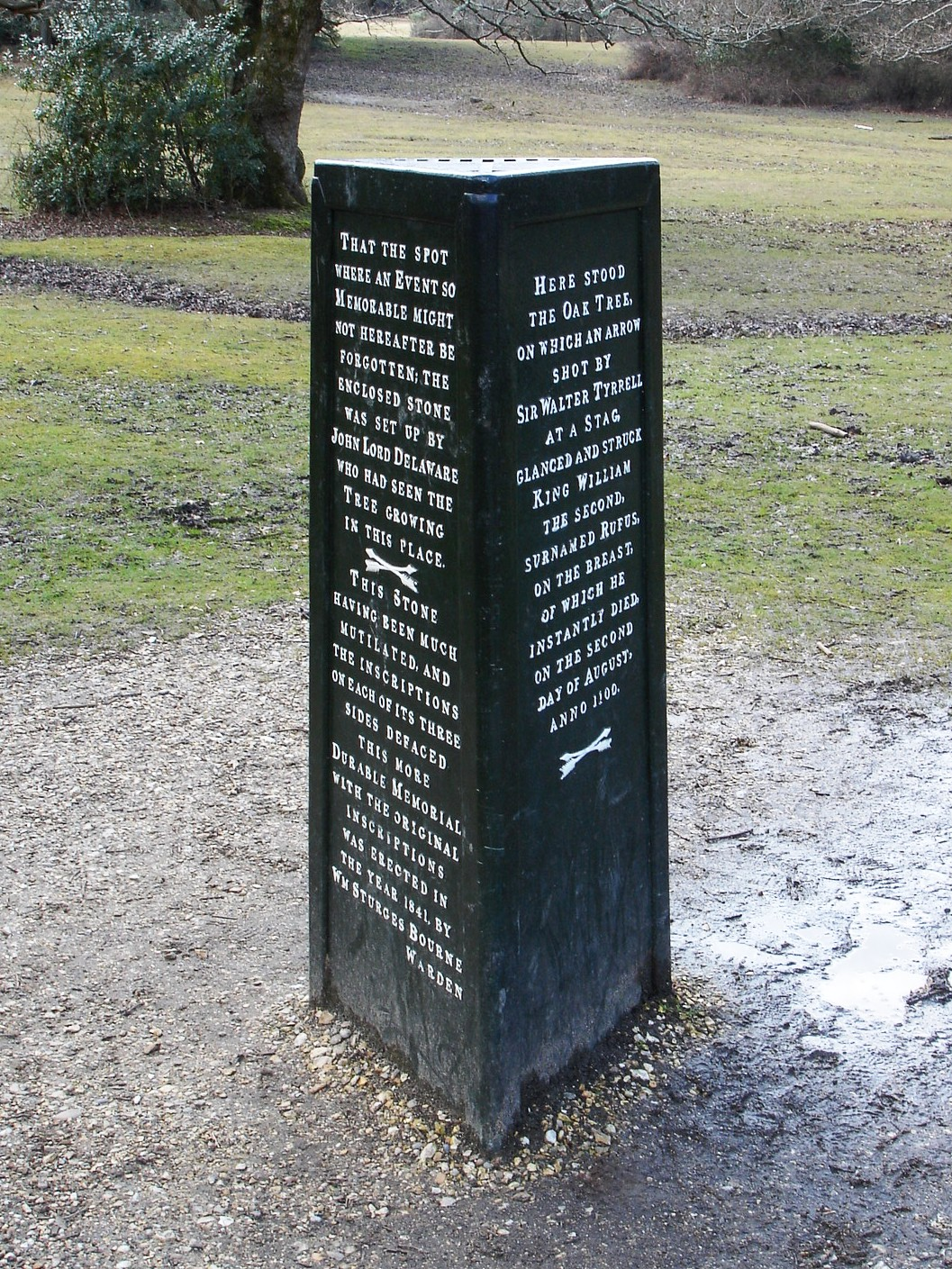
The site of the Rufus Stone, now a metal monument

A stone known as the "Rufus Stone", close to the A31 near Minstead (grid reference SU270124), is claimed to mark the spot where William fell. The claim that this is the location of his death appears to date from no earlier than a 17th-century visit by Charles II to the forest. At the time the most popular account of William's death involved the fatal arrow deflecting off a tree, and Charles appears to have been shown a suitable tree. Letters in The Gentleman's Magazine report that the tree was cut down and burned during the 18th century. Later in that century the Rufus Stone was set up. Originally it was around 5 feet 10 inches (1.78 m) tall with a stone ball on top. King George III visited the stone in 1789, along with Queen Charlotte, and an inscription was added to the stone to commemorate the visit. It was protected with a cast iron cover in 1841 after repeated vandalism.

The inscription on the Rufus Stone reads:

Here stood the Oak Tree, on which an arrow shot by Sir Walter Tyrrell at a Stag, glanced and struck King William the Second, surnamed Rufus, on the breast, of which he instantly died, on the second day of August, anno 1100.

That the spot where an Event so Memorable might not hereafter be forgotten; the enclosed stone was set up by John Lord Delaware who had seen the Tree growing in this place. This Stone having been much mutilated, and the inscriptions on each of its three sides defaced, this more Durable Memorial, with the original inscriptions, was erected in the year 1841, by Wm [William] Sturges Bourne Warden.

King William the Second, surnamed Rufus being slain, as before related, was laid in a cart, belonging to one Purkis, (Note: The claim was first made by a certain Mr Purkis of the family of charcoal-burners and cottagers remaining at the same spot, who claimed descent when, in 1806, he sold a bridle he claimed was the king's to Sir Richard Phillips, claiming also to have possessed a wheel from the cart that carried his body. Sir Francis Palgrave in his The History of Normandy and of England, reported the story uncritically. The Purkis family cottage remained at Canterton until the end of the 19th century.) and drawn from hence, to Winchester, and buried in the Cathedral Church, of that City.

== Legacy ==
William was an effective soldier, but he was a ruthless ruler and, it seems, was little liked by those he governed. According to the Anglo-Saxon Chronicle, he was "hated by almost all his people and abhorrent to God." Chroniclers tended to take a dim view of William's reign, arguably on account of his long and difficult struggles with the Church: these chroniclers were generally clerics, so might be expected to report him somewhat negatively. His chief minister was Ranulf Flambard, whom he appointed Bishop of Durham in 1099: this was a political appointment, to a see that was also a great fiefdom. The particulars of the king's relationship with the people of England are not credibly documented. Contemporaries of William, as well as those writing after his death, roundly denounced him for presiding over what these dissenters considered a dissolute court. In keeping with the tradition of Norman leaders, William scorned the English and the English culture.

=== Sexuality ===
William never took a wife or a mistress, nor fathered any children. As a bachelor king without an heir, William would have been pressed to take a wife and would have had numerous proposals for marriage. Several alternative explanations for this have emerged. He may have taken a vow of chastity or celibacy. He may have used the promise of potential marriage as a lever to make alliances. He may not have wanted a powerful woman in his court: his father was regularly at odds with his mother. Some have suggested that William may have been homosexual, although this would appear to be at odds with chroniclers who state that William took female lovers, and the fact that monarchs who were rumoured to have taken same-sex lovers, like Edward II, were known to marry for political reasons.

Contemporaries of William raised concerns about a court dominated by homosexuality and effeminacy, epitomised more through seemingly "luxurious" attire and unusual footwear than with sexual practices. Citing the traditions of Wilton Abbey in the 1140s, Herman of Tournai writes that the abbess had ordered the Scottish princess Edith (later Matilda, wife of Henry) to become a nun in order to protect her from the lust of William, which angered Edith's father because of the effect it might have on her prospects of marriage. The historian Emma Mason has noted that while during his reign William was never openly accused of homosexuality, in the decades after his death numerous medieval writers spoke of this and a few began to describe him as a "sodomite". Modern historians cannot state with certainty whether William was homosexual.

Barlow states that the Welsh chronicles claim that Henry was able to succeed to the throne because his brother had made use of concubines and thus died childless, although no illegitimate offspring are named. Barlow also allows that William may have been sterile. Noting that no "favourites" were identified, and that William's "baronial friends and companions were mostly married men", despite having concluded that the chroniclers were "hostile and biased witnesses", Barlow considers that "there seems no reason why they should have invented this particular charge" (of homosexuality) and states "On the whole the evidence points to the king's bisexuality".

== Citations ==
William Rufus House of Normandy Born: c. 1056 Died: 2 August 1100
Regnal titles
Preceded by William I	King of England; 1087–1100	Succeeded by Henry I
