= Cecilia of Normandy =

Anglo-Norman royal and abbess (c. 1056–1126)

Cecilia
- Abbess of Holy Trinity
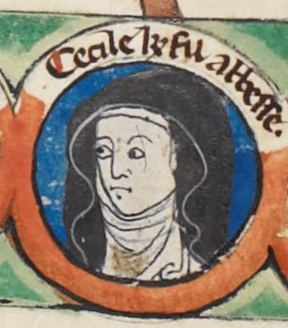
- Cecilia depicted on the family tree with her sisters
- Born: c. 1056; Normandy
- Died: 30 July 1126 (aged 69–70); Caen
- House: Normandy
- Father: William the Conqueror
- Mother: Matilda of Flanders

Cecilia of Normandy (or Cecily; c. 1056 – 30 July 1126) was a French abbess, thought to be the eldest daughter of William the Conqueror and Matilda of Flanders.

== Life ==
She was the sister of William II and Henry I of England. She was very close to her other brother, Robert Curthose. She was given a high education in the arts, Latin, rhetoric and logic by the scholar Arnulf of Chocques.

Cecilia was entered into the Abbey of the Holy Trinity of Caen at a young age by her parents. She was placed in the convent in June 1066 at its formal inauguration. The convent was founded by her mother as a penance for her marriage, which was initially regarded as a prohibited degree of kinship, as well as during the preparations of the invasion of England.

To give a child to the church in this manner was common for parents during this time period. A daughter of the nobility was often treated very well. She was allowed her own household and confessor as well as allowed to receive guests in private in her rooms; a far more liberated lifestyle than the one led by most unmarried noblewomen. After having been placed in the convent, she was educated by the abbess Matilda.

In 1100, she was visited by her brother Robert Curthose on his return from the First Crusade. He presented her and her abbey with a captured Saracen banner.

Cecilia had a successful career at the convent. Cecilia was possibly the only child to be present on the funeral of her mother in 1083, as it took place in her convent, and no other child is confirmed to have been present. She introduced a number of improvements to the convent and functioned as the coadjutor or deputy of the abbess, her relative Matilda. She succeeded her relative Matilda as Abbess of the Abbey of Sainte-Trinité in Caen in 1112.

Her good reputation was described by Baldric of Dol, archbishop of Dol, and the poet Hildebert of Le Mans, who referred to her as "a queen, a goddess and a royal virgin, who married a heavenly husband".

Cecilia died on 30 July 1126 in Caen, France. She was buried within the abbey walls. Her tomb is walled up without any opening being left through which it can be discovered. Her father was also buried in Caen.
