= Adeliza of Normandy =

Anglo-Norman princess (died before 1113)

Adeliza
- Died: died before 1113
- House: Normandy
- Father: William the Conqueror
- Mother: Matilda of Flanders

Adeliza or Adelida (died before 1113) was a daughter of William the Conqueror and his wife, Matilda of Flanders. There is considerable uncertainty about her life, including her dates of birth and death. She was usually the first daughter in lists of William's children, for example in a mortuary roll prepared at her sister's religious house, and thus probably was the eldest. Her inclusion in the mortuary roll indicates that her death preceded the date of its 1113 compilation.

== Biography ==
In the additions Orderic Vitalis made to the Gesta Normannorum Ducum (Deeds of the Norman Dukes), he states that prior to his death at the Battle of Hastings, Harold Godwinson was betrothed to "Adelidis", a daughter of William, and that she remained single after his death. Calling her "Adelida", Robert of Torigni follows Orderic in showing her as the affianced of Harold.

However, in the later books of his Historia Ecclesiastica, Orderic instead states that Adeliza was "a virgin under the protection of Roger de Beaumont" which, in the view of historian Elisabeth van Houts, probably means that she was a nun of St Léger at Préaux. Orderic makes a previously unknown sister Agatha the fiancée of Harold, and also of Alfonso VI of León and Castile.

She was almost certainly the Adeliza addressed by Archbishop Anselm of Canterbury in prayers and meditations as a "venerable lady of royal nobility".
