= Abbey of Sainte-Trinité, Caen =

Former nunnery in Caen, Normandy

Coordinates: 49°11′11″N 0°21′10″W

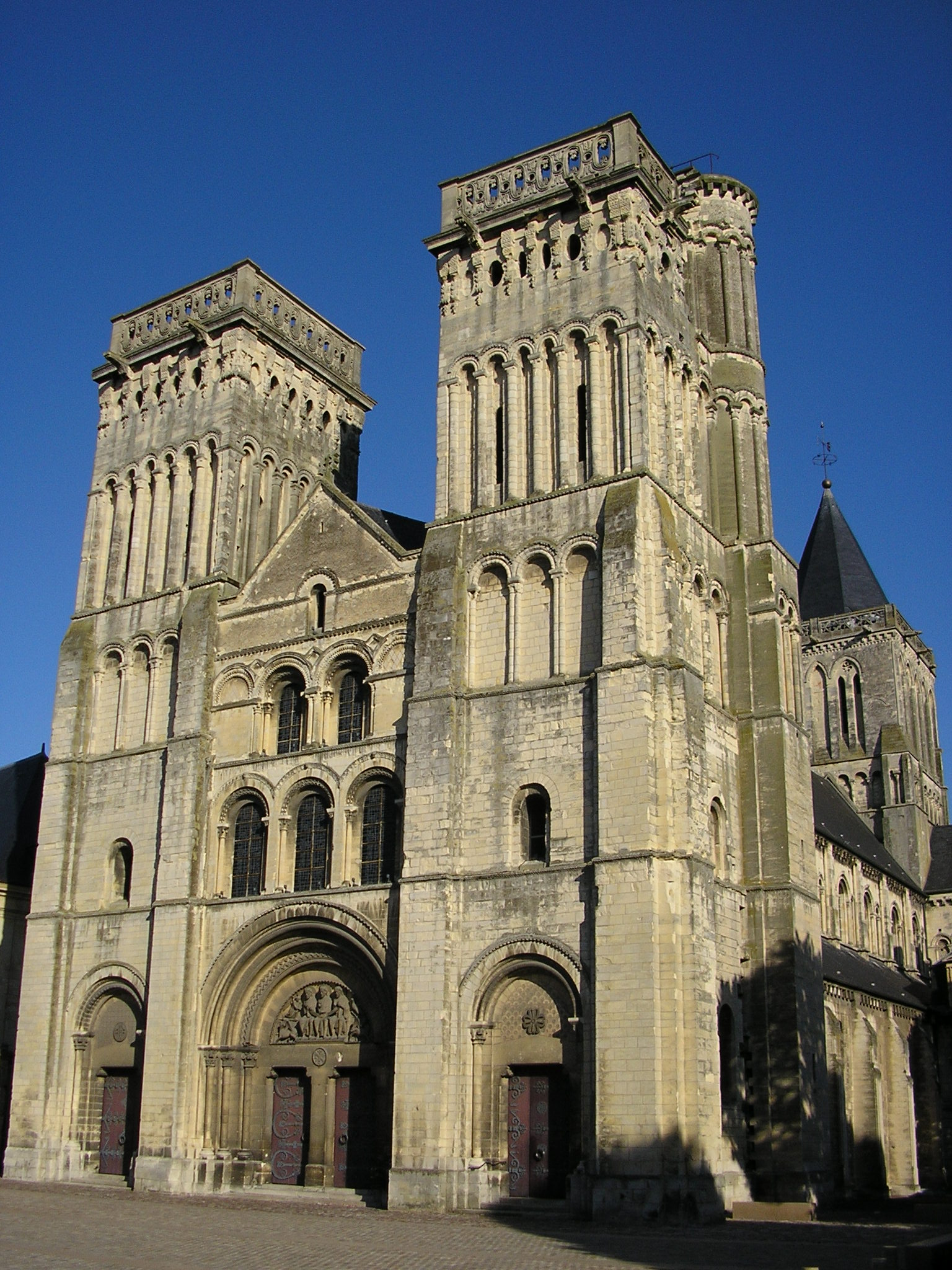
Façade

The Abbey of Sainte-Trinité (French: Abbaye de la Sainte-Trinité), better known as the Abbaye aux Dames (French pronunciation: [abei o dam]), is a former Benedictine nunnery in Caen, Normandy. It was the home of the now the Regional Council of Lower Normandy and is now home to the Regional Council of Normandy. The complex includes the Church of Sainte-Trinité (the Holy Trinity).

== History ==
The abbey was founded as a Benedictine nunnery in the late 11th century by William the Conqueror and his wife Matilda of Flanders as the Abbaye aux Dames ("Women's Abbey"), as was the Abbaye aux Hommes ("Men's Abbey"), more formally the Abbey of Saint-Étienne. The works began in 1062, starting from the rear, and were completed in 1130. Matilda, who died in 1083, was buried in the choir under a slab of black marble.

William and Matilda's son, William II of England, granted the abbey the manor of Horstead, in Norfolk, where Horstead Priory was established by the order, and continued until 1414.

The original spires were destroyed in the Hundred Years' War and replaced by less striking balustrades in the early 18th century. The nuns were dispersed, and the abbey was suppressed, in the French Revolution. In 1823 the town council decided to transfer the ancient Hôtel-Dieu (possibly also founded by William the Conqueror, but more likely King Henry II of England), to the former monastic premises for use as a hospital, and the canonesses regular, who had assumed responsibility for the hospital from the two abbeys during the 14th century, established themselves there. The canonesses continued to operate there until 1908 when the facility was given to the Hospice Saint-Louis for use as a nursing home.

The vault was demolished and rebuilt in 1865. The church was last restored between 1990 and 1993.

== Burials ==
- Matilda of Flanders
- Cecilia of Normandy

== Architecture ==
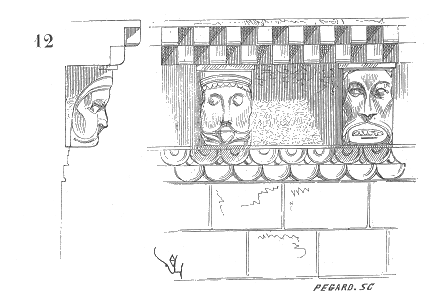
Detail of the abbey's stonework

The façade has two large towers at the sides, each with doors leading to the aisles. The pediment of the central bay echoes the nave roof. The tympanum of the central portal depicts the Trinity and the four apocalyptic beasts, symbols of the Four Evangelists.

The nave is surmounted by a gallery (triforium). Over the aisles is a groin vault, the first of this type built in Normandy (1130). The transept, in the centre of the church, houses the main altar. The northern transept is in Romanesque style, opening over a small apse (the chapel of the Blessed Sacrament) which houses the tabernacle. The southern transept is characterised by Gothic columns integrated within the Romanesque decoration.

The choir ends with an apse decorated by four columns and a gallery with fantastic figures. Also present is a crypt in honour of Saint Nicholas.

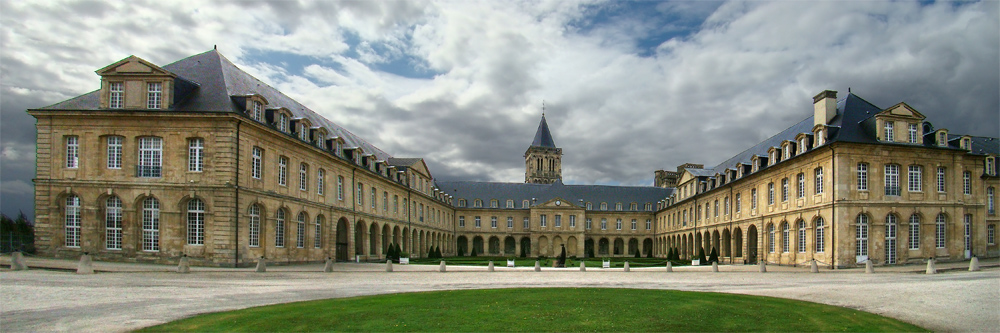
The conventual buildings
