= Constance of Normandy =

Anglo-Norman princess, Duchess of Brittany from 1086 to 1090

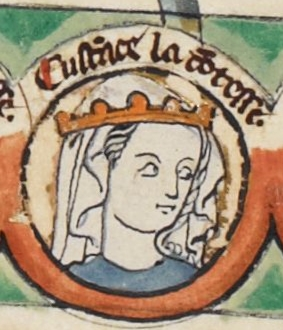
- Depiction of Constance (English kings' family tree)

Duchess consort of Brittany
- Tenure: 1086–1090
- Born: c. 1057/1061; Normandy
- Died: 13 August 1090
- Burial: Église Saint-Melaine, Rennes
- Spouse: Alan IV, Duke of Brittany (m. 1086)
- House: Normandy
- Father: William the Conqueror
- Mother: Matilda of Flanders

Constance of Normandy (between 1057 and 1061 – 13 August 1090) was a Duchess of Brittany.

She was one of the nine children of William the Conqueror and Matilda of Flanders. She was born in Normandy, where her father was duke. William of Jumièges, the monk who chronicled the 1066 Norman conquest of England, names Constance second among the daughters of King William and Queen Matilda. No source indicates the order of birth of the couple's daughters, however.

In 1086, Constance's father arranged a marriage between the duke of Brittany Alan Fergant and Constance, who was already nearly 30, to ensure peace at his Western border. Like her mother, Constance was an able administrator. William of Malmesbury, an early 12th-century historian, wrote that her "severe and conservative manner" made Constance an unpopular duchess. According to his contemporary, Orderic Vitalis, however, Constance was caring, considerate, and well-liked by her subjects. William of Malmesbury alleges that her husband had their servants poison her. She died on 13 August 1090.

Royal titles
Preceded by Bertha of Blois	Duchess consort of Brittany; 1086–1090	Succeeded by Ermengarde of Anjou
