= Lantern tower =

Windowed tower atop the crossing of a cruciform church

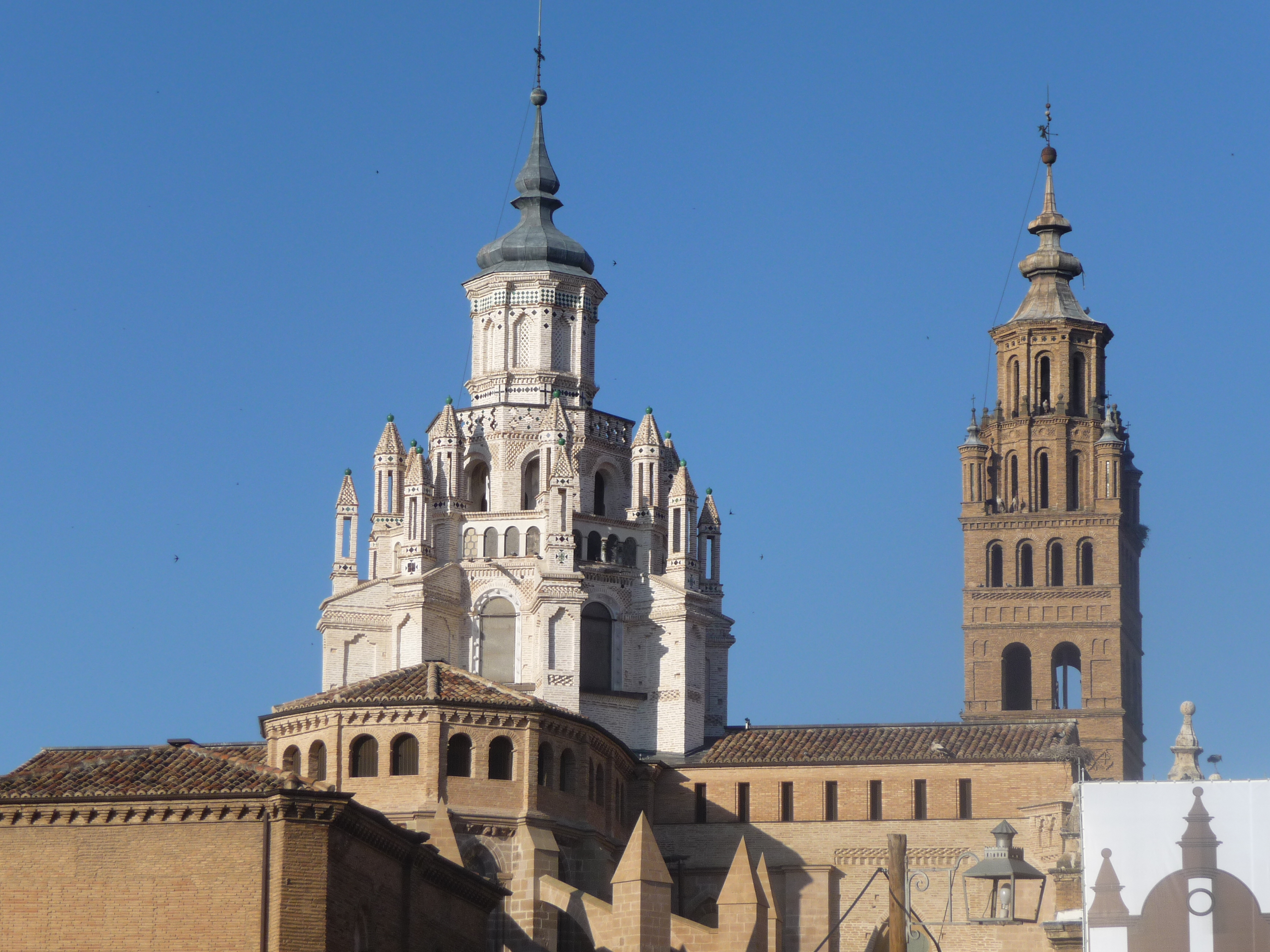
Lantern tower (left) and bell tower at Tarazona Cathedral, Spain

In church architecture, the lantern tower is a tall construction above the junction of the four arms of a cruciform (cross-shaped) church, with openings through which light from outside can shine down to the crossing (so it is also called a crossing lantern).

Many lantern towers are octagonal and give an extra dimension to the decorated interior of the dome.

An affiliated term is the Italian tiburio, which is the lantern set above a dome. Like a lantern tower, a tiburio is often polygonal and interspersed with windows both to lighten the load and allow for light to shine. The word tiburio is from the Medieval Latin tiburium (lit. 'hut', a variant of tugurium).

== Gallery ==
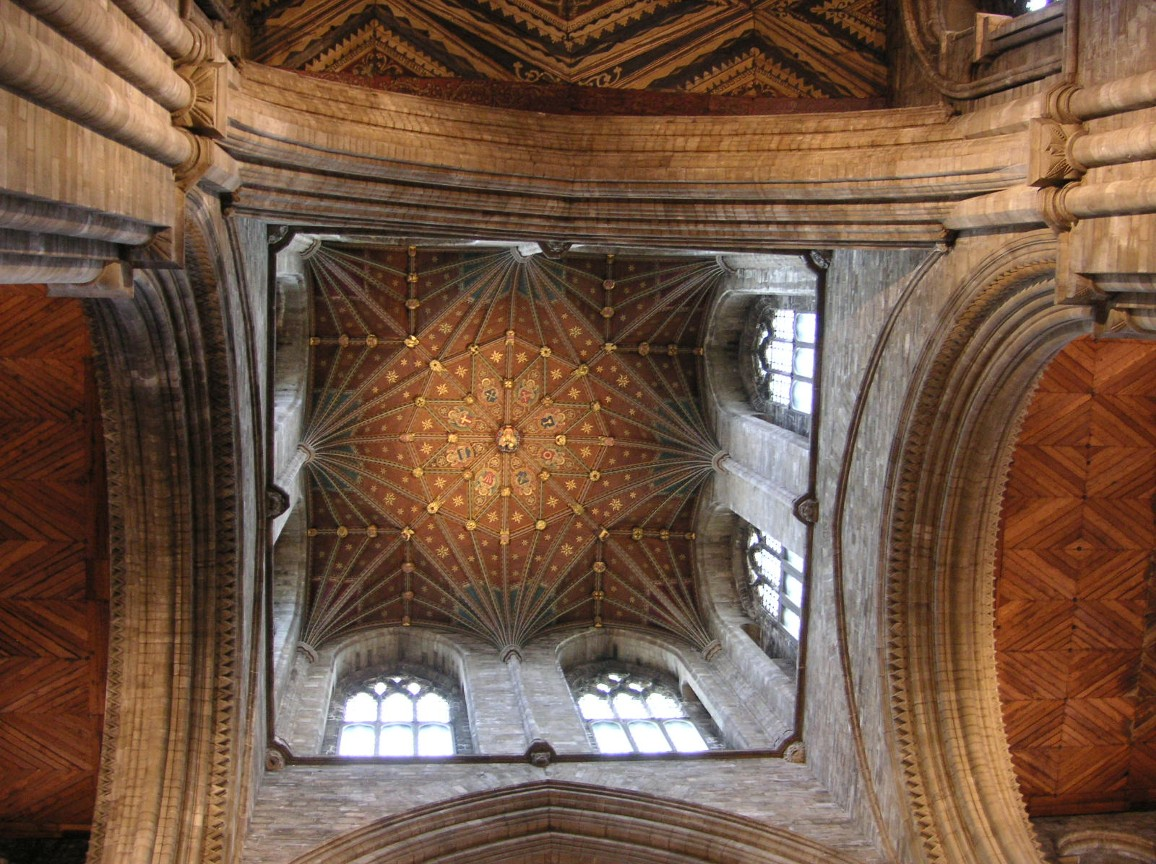
Interior, Peterborough Cathedral, UK

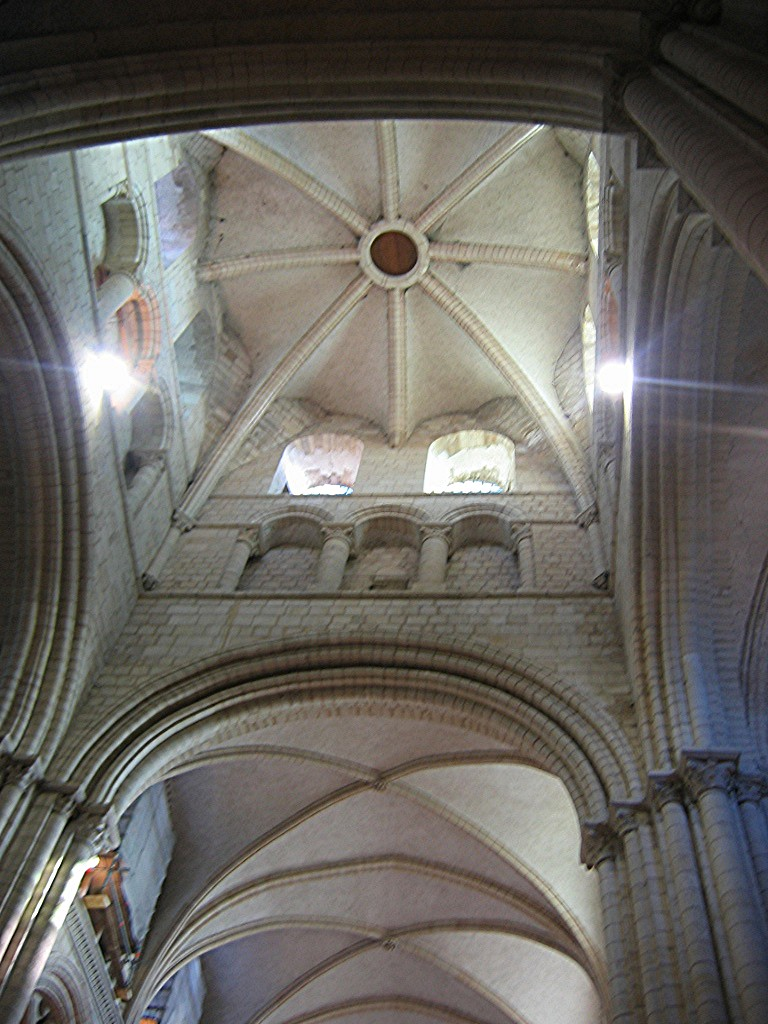
Interior, Saint-Étienne's Church, Caen

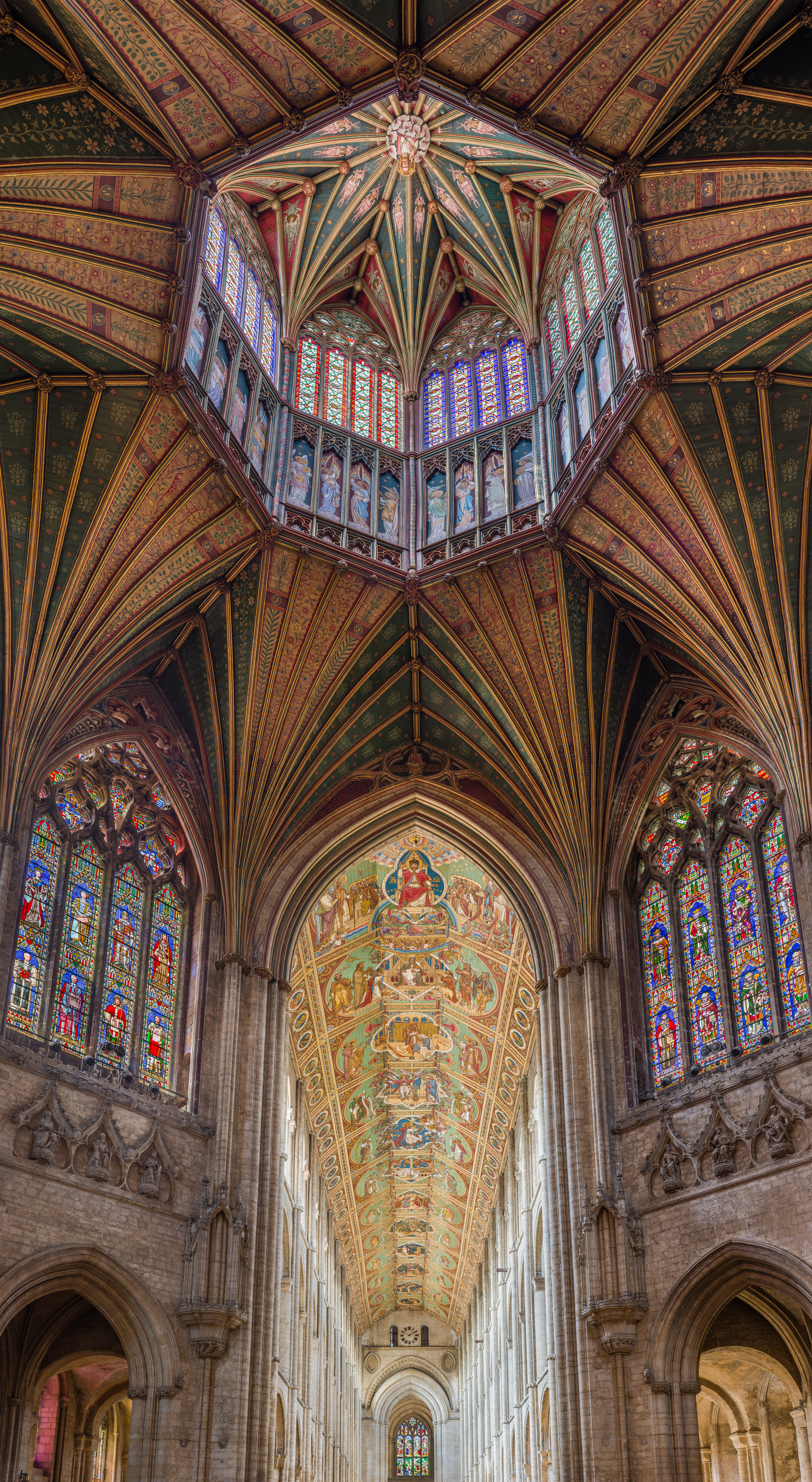
The timber lantern of Ely Cathedral

== See also ==
- Roof lantern
- Symbolism of domes
