= Matilda of Flanders =

Queen of England from 1066 to 1083

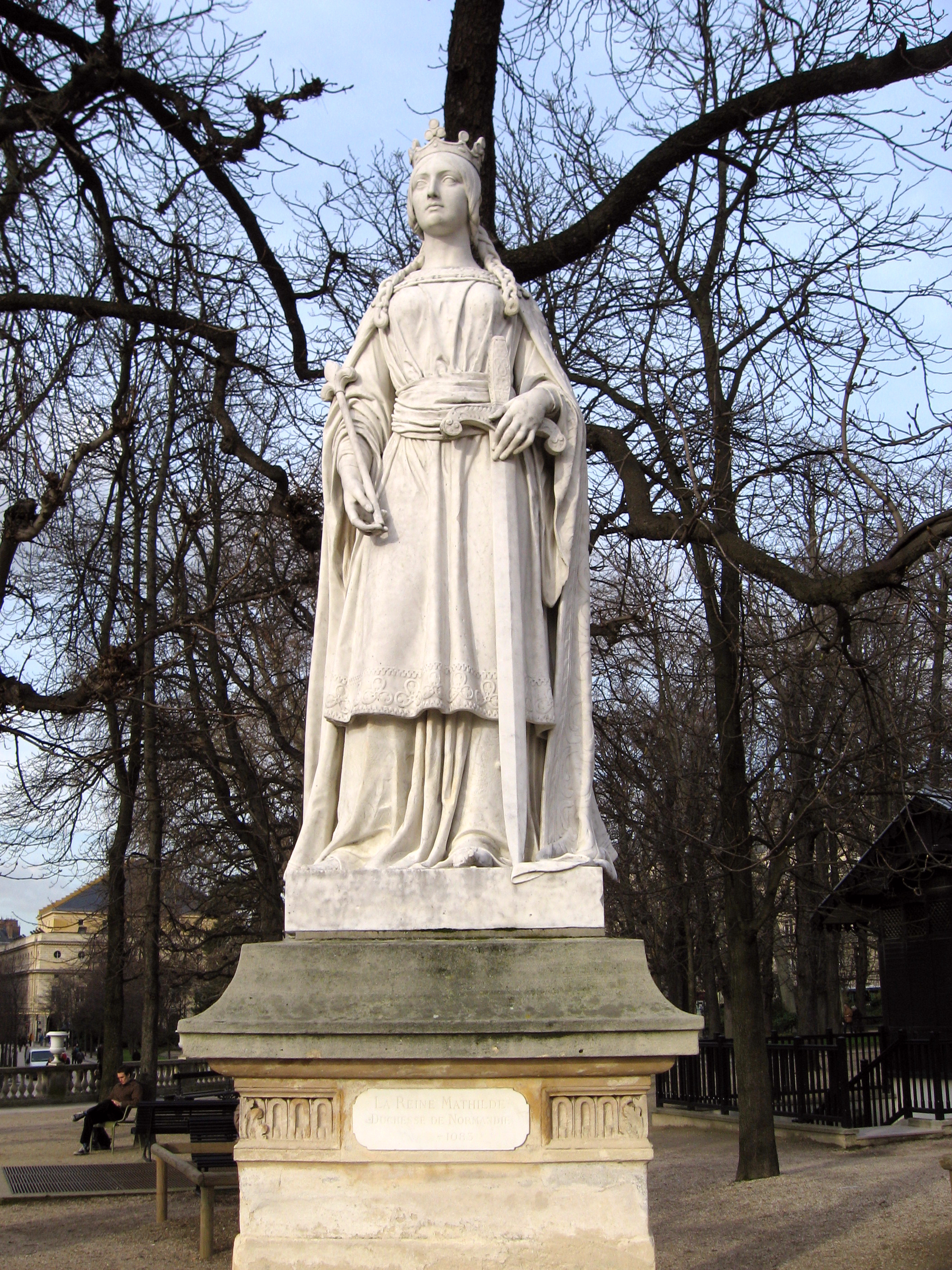
- Modern statue of Matilda of Flanders, one of the twenty Reines de France et Femmes illustres in the Jardin du Luxembourg, Paris, by Carle Elshoecht c. 1850

Queen consort of England
- Tenure: 25 December 1066 – 2 November 1083
- Coronation: 11 May 1068
- Died: 2 November 1083
- Burial: l'Abbaye aux Dames, Caen, Normandy
- Spouse: William I, King of England (m. 1051/2)
- Issue Detail: Robert II, Duke of Normandy; Richard; Adeliza; Cecilia; William II, King of England; Constance, Duchess of Brittany; Adela, Countess of Blois; Henry I, King of England
- House: Flanders
- Father: Baldwin V, Count of Flanders
- Mother: Adela of France

Matilda of Flanders (French: Mathilde; Dutch: Mathilde; German: Mechtild; died 2 November 1083) was the daughter of Baldwin V, the Count of Flanders. She became Duchess of Normandy by marriage to William the Conqueror, and regent of Normandy during his absences from the duchy, when William was on campaign in England. Two years after William conquered England she was crowned Queen of England. She was the mother of at least nine children who survived to adulthood, including two kings of England, William II and Henry I.

== Family background ==
Matilda was born into the House of Flanders to Baldwin V of Flanders and Adela of France. Flanders was of strategic importance to England and Europe as a "stepping stone between England and the Continent," necessary for strategic trade and for keeping the Scandinavian intruders from England. A member of the aristocracy, Matilda was of grander birth than her husband William, who was illegitimate. She was descended from Charlemagne and was closely related to most of the royal families of Europe. Her grandfather was Robert II of France. Her uncle was King Henry I of France, William's suzerain, who was succeeded by her cousin King Philip I of France in 1060. A marriage to a member of the Carolingian royal family was a means of upward mobility for a soldier or nobleman like William. Her descent from Alfred the Great (whose daughter Ælfthryth was the mother of Arnulf I, Count of Flanders, and great-great-great-great-grandmother of Matilda) also proved a legitimizing factor as queen of England.

== Marriage ==
William started to negotiate as early as 1047 with Baldwin V about a marriage with Matilda. Baldwin and William shared an interest in a marriage to stabilize relations between Flanders and Normandy and settle border disputes. Since 1046, Baldwin was in conflict with the Holy Roman Emperor Henry III over the eastward expansion of his county and was in need of support. For William the marriage had the added value of marrying into a house with a very strong ancestral bloodline which would compensate his own illegitimate ancestry. Despite a papal ban in 1049 by Pope Leo IX at the Council of Reims on the grounds of consanguinity, William and Matilda were married after a delay in c. 1051–1052. According to the eleventh-century Gesta Normannorum Ducum compiled by William of Jumièges, the marriage took place at the castle of Eu.

Like many royal marriages of the period, it breached the rules of consanguinity, then at their most restrictive (to seven generations or degrees of relatedness). Matilda and William were fourth-cousins (fifth-degree relatives), as Matilde's great-great-grandmother Gerloc was the sister of William's great-great-grandfather, William Longsword. Longsword and Gerloc were children of Rollo. There was usually some flexibility in the application of such marriage laws in France and England. However Leo, a strong supporter of Henry III, used it as a pretext to block an alliance between two opponents of the German emperor. As the ban gave his opponents an argument to dispute his authority as the Duke of Normandy, William sent his friend and adviser Lanfranc, who was prior of Bec Abbey, to Rome in order to advocate a lift of the ban. Lanfranc was not successful with Leo nor his two successors Victor II and Stephen IX, who were all of German origin and anti-Normandic due to the Norman conquest of southern Italy, but finally he was more successful with Pope Nicholas II and obtained a papal dispensation in 1059.

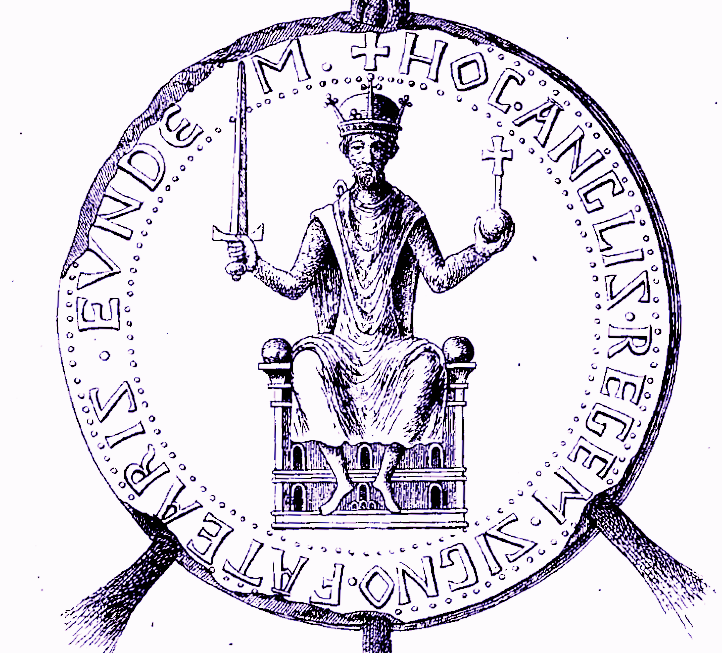
Seal of William the Conqueror

The marriage was by all accounts very happy and fruitful. Matilda bore her husband at least nine children in a period of twenty years, and most contemporaries believed that William was never unfaithful to her. There is no evidence of any illegitimate children born to William.

== Duchess of Normandy ==
When William embarked on the Norman Conquest of England, he sailed in his flagship Mora, which Matilda had given him. William appointed Matilda as regent for the Duchy of Normandy during his absence. Matilda successfully guided the duchy through this period in the name of her fourteen-year-old son; no major uprisings or unrest occurred. She served as regent in Normandy during the absence of William six times: in 1066–1067, in 1067–1068, in 1069, in 1069–1072, in 1074 and, finally, in 1075–1076.

== Queen of England ==
Matilda travelled for the first time to England in April 1068, nearly two years after William conquered England. She was crowned queen on 11 May 1068 in Westminster Abbey during the feast of Pentecost (Whit Sunday), in a ceremony presided over by the archbishop of York. Three new phrases were incorporated to cement the importance of a queen, stating that she was divinely placed by God, shared in royal power, and blessed her people by her power and virtue. Her claims to authority were enhanced through a special acclamation, or laudes, crafted especially for her. William was re-crowned at the same time in order to demand the court's respect.

According to Orderic Vitalis in his Historia Ecclesiastica, Mathilde supported her son Robert with large sums of money when he revolted against his father in 1078.

She stood as godmother for Matilda of Scotland, who would become Queen of England after marrying Matilda's son Henry I. During the christening, the baby pulled Queen Matilda's headdress down on top of herself, which was seen as an omen that the younger Matilda would be queen some day as well.

== Death and burial ==
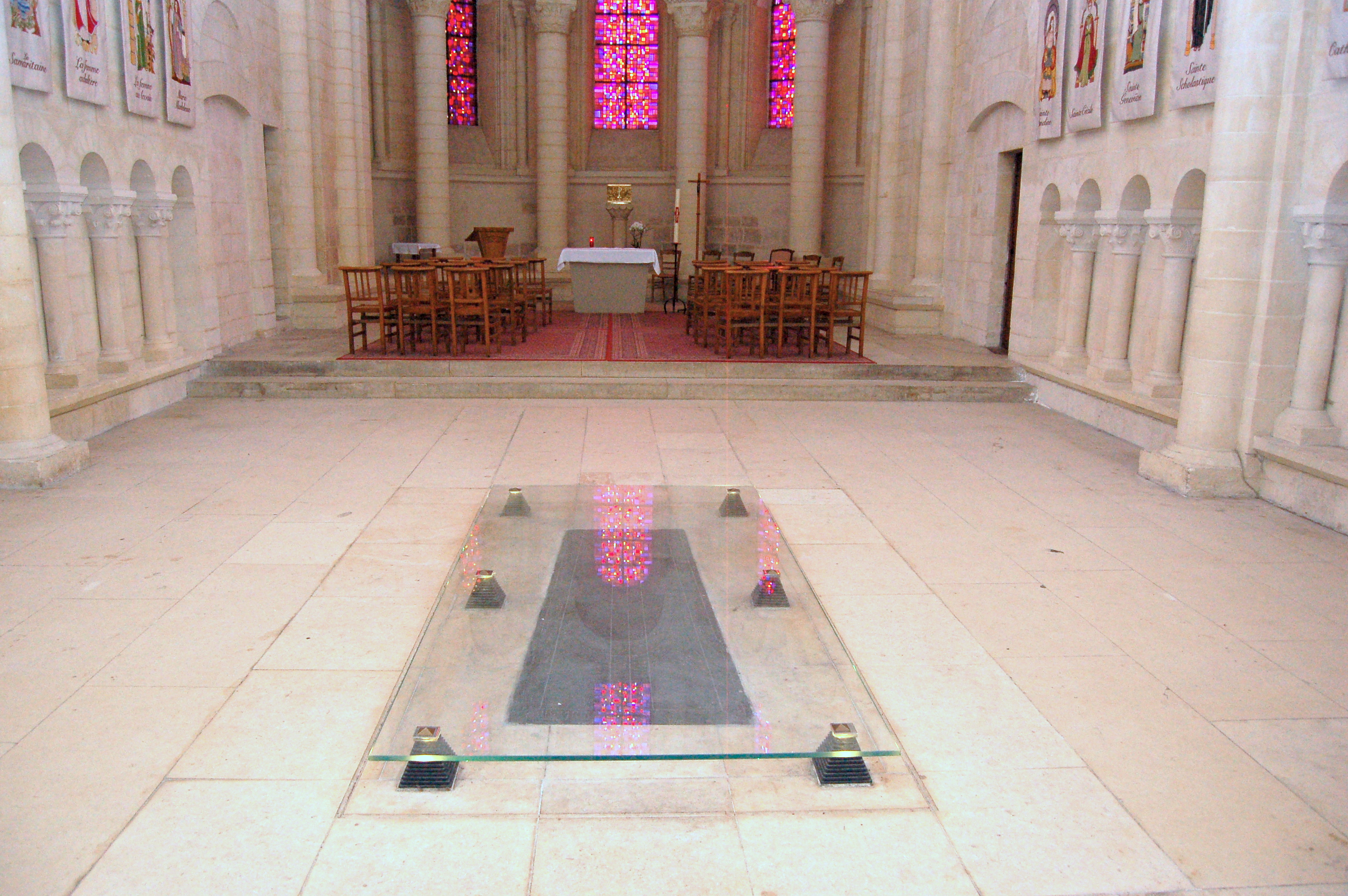
Tomb of Matilda of Flanders at the Abbaye aux Dames, Caen

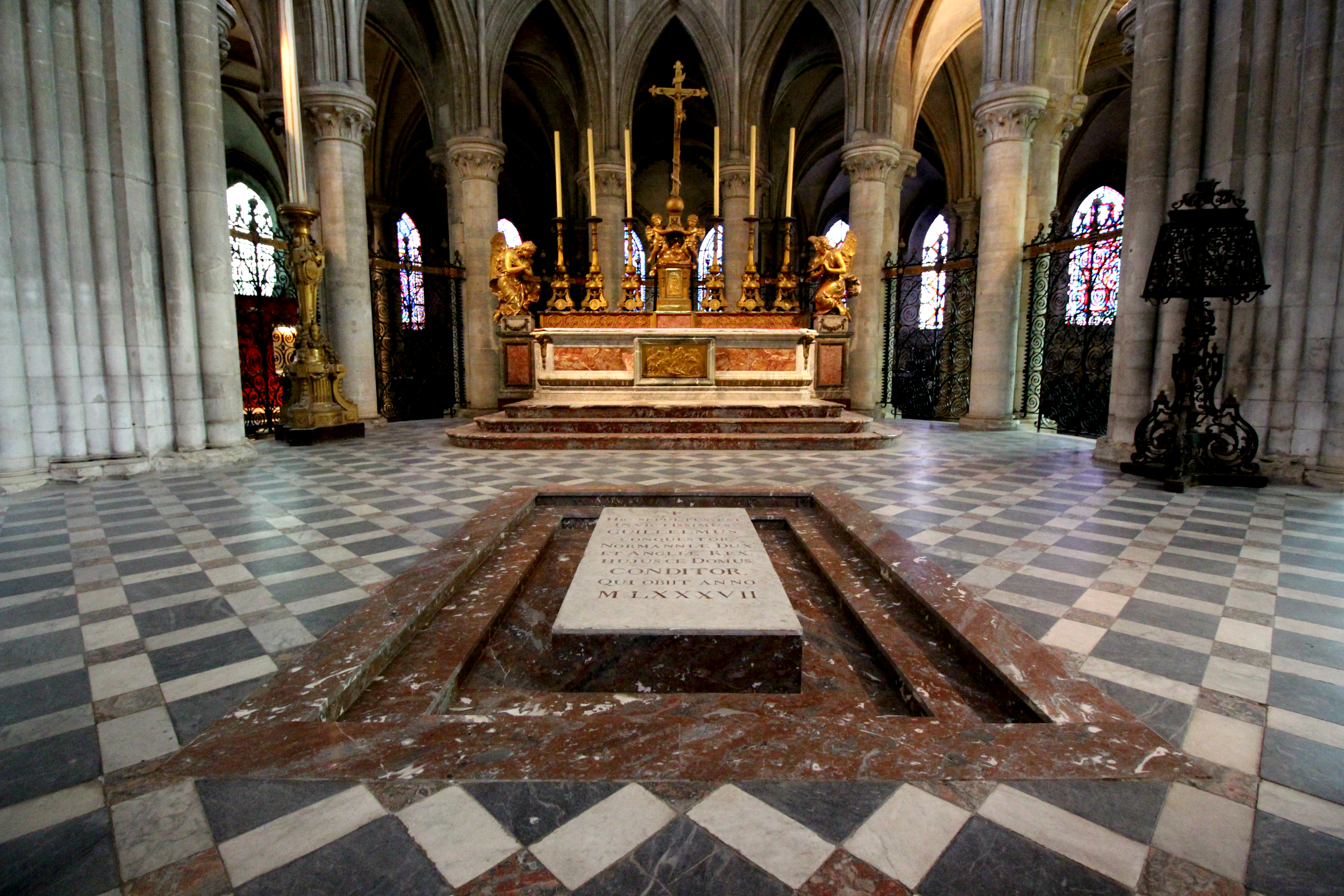
Tomb of William the Conqueror at the Abbey of Saint-Étienne, Caen

Matilda fell ill during the summer of 1083 and died on 2 November 1083. Her husband was present for her final confession. William swore to give up hunting, his favourite sport, to express his grief after the death of his wife. He himself died four years later in 1087.

She was buried in Caen at the Abbaye aux Dames. An 11th-century slab of black ledger stone decorated with her epitaph, marks her grave at the rear of the church. Over time Matilda's tomb was desecrated and her original coffin destroyed. Her remains were placed in a sealed box and reburied under the original black slab. In 1959 Matilda's incomplete skeleton was examined and her femur and tibia were measured to determine her height. Her height was 5 feet (152 cm), a normal female height for the time. However, as a result of this examination she was misreported as being 4 feet 2 inches (127 cm) leading to the myth that she was extremely small.

== Issue ==
Matilda and William had four sons and at least five daughters. The birth order of the boys is clear, but no source gives the relative order of birth of the daughters. Only one of the children was born in England; Henry was born in Yorkshire when Matilda accompanied her husband in the Harrying of the North.

Matilda took a close interest in the education of her children, who were unusually well educated for contemporary royalty. Her daughters were educated and taught to read Latin at the Abbey of Sainte-Trinité in Caen. The boys were tutored by Lanfranc, who was made Archbishop of Canterbury in 1070.

Child	Birth – Death	Notes
Robert	c. 1053 – 10 February 1134	Duke of Normandy; married Sybil of Conversano, daughter of Geoffrey of Conversano.
Richard	c. 1055 – c. 1069–74	Died young.
Adeliza (or Adelida/Adelaide)	c. 1057 – c. 1073	Betrothed to Harold Godwinson; later a nun at St Léger, Préaux.
Cecilia (or Cecily)	c. 1058 – 1127	Abbess of Holy Trinity, Caen.
William Rufus	c. 1060 – 2 August 1100	King of England; killed in the New Forest.
Matilda	c. 1061 – c. 1086	Possibly identical to Matilda d’Aincourt.
Constance	c. 1062 – 1090	Married Alan IV Fergent, Duke of Brittany.
Adela	c. 1067 – 1137	Married Stephen, Count of Blois; mother of King Stephen of England.
Henry	late 1068 – 1 December 1135	King of England; married Matilda of Scotland and later Adeliza of Louvain.
Agatha	— (Note: It is not certain Adeliza and Agatha were distinct daughters, but if they were, William of Jumièges likely confused them. None of the daughters’ ages is known according to Orderic Vitalis. See Douglas 1964, p. 395; Ordericus Vitalis 1854, pp. 181–182, n. 1)	Betrothed to Harold Godwinson, Alfonso VI of Castile, and possibly Herbert I, Count of Maine, but died unmarried.

== Legends ==
There were rumours that Matilda had been in love with the English ambassador to Flanders and with Brictric, an Anglo-Saxon thegn, who (according to the account by the Continuator of Wace and others) in his youth declined her advances. Whatever the truth of the matter, years later she is said to have used her authority to confiscate Brictric's lands and throw him into prison, where he died.

According to a twelfth-century chronicler from Saint-Martin de Tours, when the Norman duke William the Bastard (later called the Conqueror) sent his representative to ask for Matilda's hand in marriage, she replied that she was far too high-born to consider marrying a bastard. After hearing this response, William rode from Normandy to Bruges, found her at the Burg square emerging from Saint-Donatian church, threw her on the ground and pursued his rough courtship in the roadside mud. Naturally, Baldwin took offence at this; but before they could draw swords, Matilda settled the matter by refusing to marry anyone but William. In the thirteenth-century Chronique Rimée of Philippe Mouskes, Matilda exclaims preferring to become a nun instead of the wife of a bastard.

In the Gesta Normannorum Ducum, William of Jumièges mentions that as penance for the dispensation of the ban on their marriage, Matilda and William promised to found an abbey each: the Abbaye aux Hommes and the Abbaye aux Dames or the Sainte-Trinité Abbey. William and Matilda indeed built these abbeys, but it is not proven that penance was the motive for the foundation of these abbeys. As his capital Rouen was situated too far in the East of his territories, William wanted to expand Caen as his capital in the West, where he built a large castle. The two abbeys were a further testimony to their authority and wealth.

For many years it was thought that Matilda had some involvement in the creation of the Bayeux Tapestry (commonly called La Tapisserie de la Reine Mathilde in French), but historians no longer believe that; it seems to have been commissioned by William's half-brother Odo, Bishop of Bayeux, and made by English artists in Kent.

Matilda of Flanders House of Flanders Born: c. 1031 Died: 2 November 1083
Royal titles
Preceded by Adela of France	Duchess consort of Normandy; 1053 – 2 November 1083	Vacant Title next held by Sybilla of Conversano
Vacant Title last held by Edith of Mercia	Queen consort of England; 25 December 1066 – 2 November 1083	Vacant Title next held by Matilda of Scotland
