= Philippe de Montfort =

Philippe de Montfort (English: Philip of Montfort) may refer to:

- Philip of Montfort, Lord of Tyre, known as Philippe I, a powerful baron in Outremer
- Philip of Montfort, Lord of Castres, known as Philippe II, eldest son of the above, a lieutenant of Charles I of Sicily

Montfort l'Amaury family tree

Guillaume de Montfort; Lord of Montfort-l'Amaury
Amaury I de Montfort; Lord of Montfort-l'Amaury
Simon I de Montfort; Lord of Montfort-l'Amaury | Mainier de Montfort; Lord of Épernon | Eva de Montfort m. William de Crispin
m. (1) Isabel dau. of Hugh Bardoul of Broyes | m. (2) Agnes dau. of Richard, Count of Évreux
Amaury II de Montfort; Lord of Montfort-l'Amaury | Isabel of Conches m. Raoul II of Tosny | Richard de Montfort; Lord of Montfort-l'Amaury | Amaury I of Évreux (Amaury III de Montfort); Count of Évreux, Lord of Montfort-l'Amaury | Adeliza de Montfort
Bertrade de Montfort m. (1) Fulk IV, Count of Anjou m. (2) Philip I, King of France | Simon II de Montfort; Lord of Montfort-l'Amaury | Guillaume de Montfort (Bishop of Paris)
Amaury II of Évreux (Amaury IV de Montfort); Count of Évreux | Simon III de Montfort; Count of Évreux, Lord of Montfort-l'Amaury | Agnes de Montfort m. Waleran de Beaumont, 1st Earl of Worcester
Amaury III of Évreux (Amaury V de Montfort); Count of Évreux | Simon de Montfort †1188; Lord of Montfort-l'Amaury m. Amicia dau. of Robert de Beaumont, 3rd Earl of Leicester | Bertrade de Montfort m. Hugh of Cyfeiliog, 5th Earl of Chester
Amaury IV of Évreux (Amaury VI de Montfort); Count of Évreux, Earl of Gloucester | Simon de Montfort, 5th Earl of Leicester (crusader) m. Alix de Montmorency | Guy de Montfort, Lord of Sidon | Petronilla de Montfort m. Barthélemy de Roye
Philippe I, Lord of Tyre
Philippe II, Lord of Castres
Amaury de Montfort; Count of Montfort l'Amaury | Simon de Montfort, 6th Earl of Leicester (leader in the Barons' War) m. Eleanor dau. of King John | Guy de Montfort, Count of Bigorre
Henry de Montfort | Amaury de Montfort (priest) | Joanna de Montfort | Eleanor de Montfort m. Llywelyn ap Gruffudd
Simon de Montfort the Younger | Guy de Montfort, Count of Nola | Richard de Montfort

Disambiguation pages: Amaury de Montfort · Guillaume de Montfort · Guy de Montfort · Jean de Montfort · Philippe de Montfort · Simon de Montfort
