= Guy de Montfort =

Guy de Montfort may refer to:

- Guy de Montfort, Lord of Sidon (died 1228)
- Guy de Montfort, Count of Bigorre (died 1220)
- Guy de Montfort, Count of Nola (1244 – c. 1288)

Montfort l'Amaury family tree

Guillaume de Montfort; Lord of Montfort-l'Amaury
Amaury I de Montfort; Lord of Montfort-l'Amaury
Simon I de Montfort; Lord of Montfort-l'Amaury	Mainier de Montfort; Lord of Épernon	Eva de Montfort m. William de Crispin
m. (1) Isabel dau. of Hugh Bardoul of Broyes	m. (2) Agnes dau. of Richard, Count of Évreux
Amaury II de Montfort; Lord of Montfort-l'Amaury	Isabel of Conches m. Raoul II of Tosny	Richard de Montfort; Lord of Montfort-l'Amaury	Amaury I of Évreux (Amaury III de Montfort); Count of Évreux, Lord of Montfort-l'Amaury	Adeliza de Montfort
Bertrade de Montfort m. (1) Fulk IV, Count of Anjou m. (2) Philip I, King of France	Simon II de Montfort; Lord of Montfort-l'Amaury	Guillaume de Montfort (Bishop of Paris)
Amaury II of Évreux (Amaury IV de Montfort); Count of Évreux	Simon III de Montfort; Count of Évreux, Lord of Montfort-l'Amaury	Agnes de Montfort m. Waleran de Beaumont, 1st Earl of Worcester
Amaury III of Évreux (Amaury V de Montfort); Count of Évreux	Simon de Montfort †1188; Lord of Montfort-l'Amaury m. Amicia dau. of Robert de Beaumont, 3rd Earl of Leicester	Bertrade de Montfort m. Hugh of Cyfeiliog, 5th Earl of Chester
Amaury IV of Évreux (Amaury VI de Montfort); Count of Évreux, Earl of Gloucester	Simon de Montfort, 5th Earl of Leicester (crusader) m. Alix de Montmorency	Guy de Montfort, Lord of Sidon	Petronilla de Montfort m. Barthélemy de Roye
Philippe I, Lord of Tyre
Philippe II, Lord of Castres
Amaury de Montfort; Count of Montfort l'Amaury	Simon de Montfort, 6th Earl of Leicester (leader in the Barons' War) m. Eleanor dau. of King John	Guy de Montfort, Count of Bigorre
Henry de Montfort	Amaury de Montfort (priest)	Joanna de Montfort	Eleanor de Montfort m. Llywelyn ap Gruffudd
Simon de Montfort the Younger	Guy de Montfort, Count of Nola	Richard de Montfort

Disambiguation pages: Amaury de Montfort · Guillaume de Montfort · Guy de Montfort · Jean de Montfort · Philippe de Montfort · Simon de Montfort
