= Count of Évreux =

French noble title

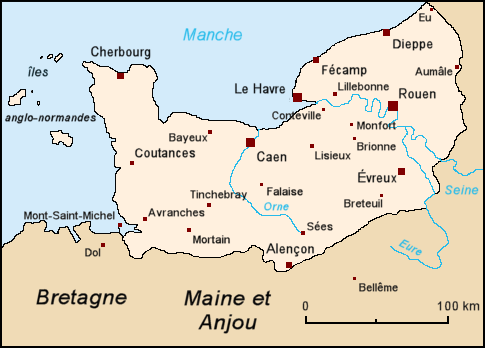
Map of Normandy

The Count of Évreux was a French noble title and was named for the county of Évreux in the Duchy of Normandy, disputed between France and England during parts of the Hundred Years' War. It was successively used by the Norman dynasty, the Montfort-l'Amaury family, the Capetians as well as the House of La Tour d'Auvergne. The title is today used by Prince Michel, Count of Évreux, a member of the House of Orléans.

== House of Normandy ==
- 989–1037: Robert, Count of Évreux, illegitimate son of Richard I, Duke of Normandy
- 1037–1067: Richard, Count of Évreux, son of the above
- 1067–1118: William, Count of Évreux, son of the above who died childless

== House of Montfort-l'Amaury ==
- 1118–1137: Amaury I, son of William's sister Agnes of Évreux
- 1137–1140: Amaury II, son of the above
- 1140–1181: Simon, brother of the above
- 1181–1182: Amaury III, son of the above
- 1182–1195: Amaury IV, son of the above, confiscated by John of England although Amaury IV was later created Earl of Gloucester

Montfort l'Amaury family tree

Guillaume de Montfort; Lord of Montfort-l'Amaury
Amaury I de Montfort; Lord of Montfort-l'Amaury
Simon I de Montfort; Lord of Montfort-l'Amaury	Mainier de Montfort; Lord of Épernon	Eva de Montfort m. William de Crispin
m. (1) Isabel dau. of Hugh Bardoul of Broyes	m. (2) Agnes dau. of Richard, Count of Évreux
Amaury II de Montfort; Lord of Montfort-l'Amaury	Isabel of Conches m. Raoul II of Tosny	Richard de Montfort; Lord of Montfort-l'Amaury	Amaury I of Évreux (Amaury III de Montfort); Count of Évreux, Lord of Montfort-l'Amaury	Adeliza de Montfort
Bertrade de Montfort m. (1) Fulk IV, Count of Anjou m. (2) Philip I, King of France	Simon II de Montfort; Lord of Montfort-l'Amaury	Guillaume de Montfort (Bishop of Paris)
Amaury II of Évreux (Amaury IV de Montfort); Count of Évreux	Simon III de Montfort; Count of Évreux, Lord of Montfort-l'Amaury	Agnes de Montfort m. Waleran de Beaumont, 1st Earl of Worcester
Amaury III of Évreux (Amaury V de Montfort); Count of Évreux	Simon de Montfort †1188; Lord of Montfort-l'Amaury m. Amicia dau. of Robert de Beaumont, 3rd Earl of Leicester	Bertrade de Montfort m. Hugh of Cyfeiliog, 5th Earl of Chester
Amaury IV of Évreux (Amaury VI de Montfort); Count of Évreux, Earl of Gloucester	Simon de Montfort, 5th Earl of Leicester (crusader) m. Alix de Montmorency	Guy de Montfort, Lord of Sidon	Petronilla de Montfort m. Barthélemy de Roye
Philippe I, Lord of Tyre
Philippe II, Lord of Castres
Amaury de Montfort; Count of Montfort l'Amaury	Simon de Montfort, 6th Earl of Leicester (leader in the Barons' War) m. Eleanor dau. of King John	Guy de Montfort, Count of Bigorre
Henry de Montfort	Amaury de Montfort (priest)	Joanna de Montfort	Eleanor de Montfort m. Llywelyn ap Gruffudd
Simon de Montfort the Younger	Guy de Montfort, Count of Nola	Richard de Montfort

Disambiguation pages: Amaury de Montfort · Guillaume de Montfort · Guy de Montfort · Jean de Montfort · Philippe de Montfort · Simon de Montfort

== House of Capet ==
- 1298–1319: Louis, Count of Évreux, brother of Philip IV of France
- 1319–1343: Philip III of Navarre
- 1343–1378: Charles II of Navarre, confiscated by Charles V of France
- 1387–1404: Charles III of Navarre, exchanged for the newly created Duchy of Nemours

== House of Stewart ==
- 1427–1429: John Stewart of Darnley

== House of Brezé ==
- 1441–1465: Pierre de Brézé

== House of Valois ==
- 1569–1584: Francis, Duke of Anjou

== House of La Tour d'Auvergne ==
- 1605–1652: Frédéric Maurice de La Tour d'Auvergne (never used title)
- 1641–1721: Godefroy Maurice de La Tour d'Auvergne (never used title)
- 1668–1730: Emmanuel Théodose de La Tour d'Auvergne (never used title)
- 1679–1753: Louis Henri de La Tour d'Auvergne
- 1753–1771: Charles Godefroy de La Tour d'Auvergne (never used title)
- 1771–1792: Godefroy de La Tour d'Auvergne
- 1792–1802: Jacques Léopold de La Tour d'Auvergne (titular)

== House of Orléans ==
- 1941–Present: Michel d'Orléans, Prince of Orléans, son of Henri d'Orléans, Count of Paris
