= Montfort =

Montfort can refer to:

== Feudal fiefs and houses ==
- House of Montfort, a French noble house, extinct in the 14th century
- Lords, counts and dukes of Montfort-l'Amaury, fief originally held by the House of Montfort
- House of Montfort-Brittany, descendants in the female line, reigning house of the Duchy of Brittany in the 14th and 15th centuries
- Counts of Montfort (Swabia), German noble dynasty in medieval Swabia
- Baron Montfort, English peerage 1295–1367, British peerage 1741–1851

== People ==
=== House of Montfort-l'Amaury ===
- Amaury de Montfort, several individuals, including:
  - Amaury III of Montfort (died 1137), Lord of Montfort l'Amaury and Count of Évreux
  - Amaury de Montfort (died 1241) (1195–1241)
  - Amaury de Montfort (priest) (1242–1301)
- Bertrade de Montfort (c.1059–1117), Queen of France
- Guillaume de Montfort, several individuals, including:
  - Guillaume de Montfort of Hainaut
  - Guillaume de Montfort (bishop of Paris)
- Guy de Montfort, several individuals, including:
  - Guy de Montfort, Lord of Sidon (died 1228)
  - Guy de Montfort, Count of Bigorre (died 1220)
  - Guy de Montfort, Count of Nola (1244–c.1288)
- Henry de Montfort (1238–1265)
- Philip of Montfort, Lord of Castres (?–1270)
- Philip of Montfort, Lord of Tyre (?–1270)
- Richard de Montfort (c.1066–1092), Lord of Montfort l'Amaury
- Simon de Montfort, several individuals, including:
  - Simon I of Montfort (c.1025–1087), Lord of Montfort l'Amaury
  - Simon II of Montfort (c.1068–1101), Lord of Montfort l'Amaury
  - Simon de Montfort, 5th Earl of Leicester (1160–1218), Lord of Montfort l'Amaury
  - Simon de Montfort, 6th Earl of Leicester (1208–1265), pioneer of parliamentary representation

=== House of Montfort-sur-Risle ===
- Peter de Montfort (died 1265), descendant of Hugues II de Montfort-sur-Risle
- William de Montfort (second half of the 13th century), English medieval canon law scholar, singer, churchman, and university chancellor; son of Peter de Montfort

=== Swabian house of Montfort ===
- Hugo von Montfort (1357–1423), Austrian minstrel
- Johanna Katharina von Montfort (1678-1759), consort and later regent of Hohenzollern-Sigmaringen

=== Other ===
- Amicie de Montfort (before 1210–1253), French noblewoman
- Louis de Montfort (1673–1716), French priest and saint
- Maxime Monfort (born 1983), Belgian cyclist
- Nick Montfort (fl. 1999–2016), contemporary poet
- Pierre Denys de Montfort (1766–1820), French naturalist
- Matthew Montfort (fl. 1978), guitarist of Ancient Future
- Montfort Stokes (1762–1842), U.S. Senator

== Education ==
- De Montfort University, a university in Leicester, England
- Montfort Secondary School, a Catholic schools in Singapore
- Montfort Junior School, a Catholic school in Singapore
- Montfort School, Yercaud, a boarding school in Yercaud, Tamil Nadu, India
- Montfort School, Kolathur, a secondary school in Salem District, Tamil Nadu, India
- Montfort Senior Secondary School, a Catholic school in New Delhi, India
- Montfort College, a Catholic school in Chiang Mai, Thailand
- The De Montfort School, a high school and middle school in Evesham, England
- Montfort-Gymnasium Tettnang, a school for higher education in Tettnang, Germany

== Places ==
=== Canada ===
- Montfort Hospital, a hospital in Ottawa, Canada
- Montfort, a community in the municipality of Wentworth-Nord, Quebec

=== France ===
- Monfort, in the Gers département
- Montfort, Alpes-de-Haute-Provence, in the Alpes-de-Haute-Provence département
- Montfort, Doubs, in the Doubs département
- Montfort, Isère, in the Isère département on the road between Grenoble and Chambéry – part of the commune of Lumbin
- Montfort, Maine-et-Loire, in the Maine-et-Loire département
- Montfort, Pyrénées-Atlantiques, in the Pyrénées-Atlantiques département
- Montfort-en-Chalosse, in the Landes département
- Montfort-l'Amaury, in the Yvelines département
- Montfort-le-Gesnois, in the Sarthe département
- Montfort-sur-Argens, in the Var département
- Montfort-sur-Boulzane, in the Aude département
- Montfort-sur-Meu, in the Ille-et-Vilaine département
- Montfort-sur-Risle, in the Eure département
- Château de Montfort, a castle in the Dordogne département.

=== Israel ===
- Montfort (castle), crusader castle in western Galilee

=== Netherlands ===
- Montfort, Netherlands, a town in Limburg
- Montfoort, a town in Utrecht

=== United Kingdom ===
- Fry's Island, also known as De Montfort Island, in the River Thames

=== United States ===
- Montfort, Wisconsin, a village

== Other ==
- De Montfort Hall, a music and performance venue in Leicester, United Kingdom
- De Montfort Park, a football stadium complex in Hinckley, United Kingdom
- Simon de Montfort's Parliament, an early English parliament

== See also ==
- Amaury de Montfort (disambiguation)
- Monforte (disambiguation)
- Montford (disambiguation)
- Monteforte, a surname
- Mont Fort, a mountain
- Mountford
- Mountfort
- Fort Mountain, a mountain
- Hillfort or mountain fort
