= House of Montfort =

French noble house

Montfort
- Founded: c.0990; 1036 years ago
- Founder: Guillaume de Montfort
- Titles: Lord of Montfort (c. 990–1241); Lord of Castres (1202–1338); Lord of Tyre (1246–1284); Lord of Toron (1241–1266); Viscount of Albi (1209–1224); Viscounts of Carcassonne (1209–1224); Viscount of Béziers (1209–1224); Viscount of Nimes (1214–1224); Earl of Leicester (1206–1265); Earl of Gloucester (1200–1213); Count of Évreux (1118–1195); Count of Bigorre (1216–1220, 1251–1255); Count of Montfort (1224–1311); Count of Toulouse (1215–1218) (claim); Count of Squillace (1266–1300); Duke of Narbonne (1215–1218)
- Estate: Montfort-l'Amaury (ancestral)

The House of Montfort was a medieval French noble house that eventually found its way to the Kingdom of England and originated the famous Simon de Montfort, 6th Earl of Leicester. However, his father, Simon de Monfort the Elder, who led the French Crusaders during the Albigensian Crusade, is far more notorious in France and among military medievalists.

The family began when Hugh Capet granted a petty lordship to Guillaume de Montfort in the Île-de-France. His successors were to be the vassals of the counts of Beaumont. Guillaume's son, Amaury began building a castle that would eventually become the eponymous Montfort-l'Amaury. The project, however, was incomplete when he died c. 1053, but his son, Simon, finished it in 1067. His great-grandson, Simon IV would eventually marry the heiress of Leicester, and their son, Simon V would become the first Montfort earl of Leicester.

During the 13th century the family lost its ancestral seat of Montfort-l'Amaury to the House of Dreux.

== Genealogy ==
- Guillaume
  - Amaury I
    - Simon I
      - Amaury II
      - Isabel
      - Bertrade
      - Richard
      - Simon II
      - Amaury III
        - Amaury IV
        - Simon III
          - Amaury V
          - Simon IV
            - Simon V
              - Amaury VI
                - John I
                  - Beatrice
                - Marguerite
                - Laure
                - Adela
                - Pernelle
              - Simon V
                - Henry
                - Simon VI
                - Amaury
                - Guy of Nola
                  - Anastasia
                  - Tomasina
                - Joanna
                - Richard
                - Eleanor
              - Guy of Bigorre
                - Alice
                - Pernelle of Bigorre
            - Guy I of Sidon
              - Philip I
                - Philip II
                  - John
                  - Laure
                  - Eleonore
                  - Jeanne
                - John of Tyre
                - Humphrey
                  - Amaury of Montfort
                  - Rupen of Montfort
              - Pernelle
              - Alicia
              - Agnes
              - Guy II of Sidon
            - Petronilla
          - Bertrade
        - Agnès
      - Guillaume
      - Adeliza
  - Mainier
  - Eva
