= William of Évreux =

Norman aristocrat who accompanied William the Conqueror (died 1118)

Count of Évreux
- Predecessor: Richard
- Successor: Amaury I
- Full name: William
- Died: 18 April 1118
- Buried: Fontenelle Abbey, St Wandrille, France
- Noble family: House of Normandy
- Spouse: Helvise of Nevers
- Father: Richard of Évreux
- Mother: Godechildis

William of Évreux (French: Guillaume d'Évreux; died 18 April 1118) was a member of the House of Normandy who played an influential role during the Norman conquest of England, one of the few Norman aristocrats documented to have been with William the Conqueror at Hastings. He was the count of Évreux (Latin: Willelmus Comes Ebroicensis; ruled c. 1067–1118) in Normandy as well as additional lands and expanded his holdings by consenting to the marriage of his young ward and niece Bertrade to Fulk IV of Anjou, whose support against the Manceaux rebels was important for William's liege Robert Curthose. A feud between William's wife Helvise or Heloise of Nevers (died 1114) and Isabel of Conches, the wife of Raoul II of Tosny, led to open war between the two men. Helvise also governed Évreux in William's infirm old age until her own death. Having no children of his own, William was succeeded at Évreux by his sister's son Amaury III of Montfort.

== Life ==
France c. 1030, showing the location of Évreux in the Duchy of Normandy, guarding the approach from Paris

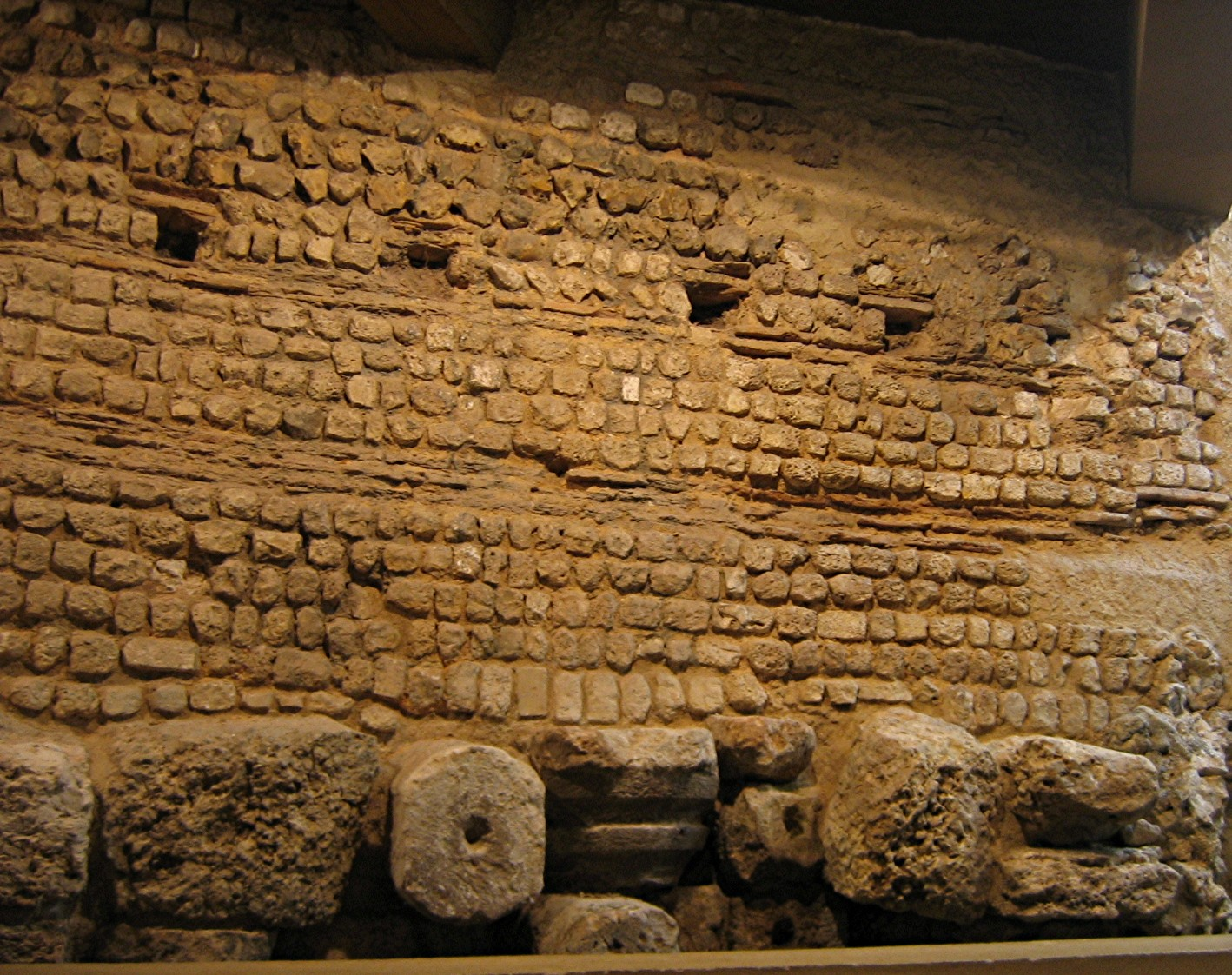
The Roman wall at Évreux

William was the son of Richard, count of Évreux, the eldest son of the influential Archbishop Robert of Rouen, a younger son of Duke Richard of Normandy. He was thus a second cousin to Duke William, who became King William I of England after the 14 October 1066 Battle of Hastings. William's mother was Richard's wife Godchildis or Adelaide, the widow of Roger I of Tosny, lord of Conches. Count Richard seems to have died after the battle c. 1067 but may have been incapacitated by illness or old age before then, as William appears already listed as count of Évreux in records from early 1066. Alternatively, William's title as count may have been an anachronism inserted by a later scribe or copyist; if so, it seems to be the only such anachronism in the Norman list.

William of Évreux is one of the few recorded companions of Duke William at Hastings. The document listing him as count reports that he contributed 80 ships to Duke William's invasion fleet, although he seems to have been very young at the time—possibly even a minor—and received very little from the spoils of the Norman conquest, only a modest tenancy-in-chief. His principal estate remained the lands around Évreux, then still principally consisting of the refurbished ruins of Roman Mediolanum Aulercorum which have all since been destroyed or lost.

William of Évreux married Helvise or Helwise of Nevers, a daughter of William, count of Nevers, and his first wife Ermengarde of Tonnerre. When Count William's brother-in-law Hubert of Beaumont and other members of the family rebelled against King William in the 1080s, he participated in the protracted siege of Sainte-Suzanne, where he was taken prisoner in 1085.

After his release, he served as the guardian of Bertrade of Montfort, the daughter of his sister Agnes. Upon King William's death, his elder son Robert Curthose became duke of Normandy while his younger son William Rufus became king of England. Robert faced numerous rebellions, many supported by his brother William. Although Count William remained generally loyal, he and Helvise did eject the garrison of the late William's soldiers from Évreux and razed their donjon. While trying to suppress a revolt of Manceaux in 1089, Duke Robert required the help of the oft-married Fulk the Rude of Anjou, who demanded Robert intervene with Count William to secure Bertrade's hand. William only consented to the marriage in exchange for Robert's restoration of numerous estates which had previously belonged to his uncle Ralph the Asshead. In 1092, having given birth to Fulk's son and heir, Bertrade eloped with or was abducted by King Philip I of France and thereafter reigned as his queen consort.

During this period, Count William's wife Helvise began feuding with Isabel of Conches, the wife of Raoul of Tosny, the lord of Conches-en-Ouche and William's half-brother, over shared insults. By 1091, this broke out into open warfare when William invaded Raoul's lands. After receiving only vague promises of support from Robert Curthose, Raoul went to William Rufus, who readily agreed to accept Raoul's fealty and further undermine his older brother's position in Normandy. Count William struck first, invading again in November 1091 with the support of St William, lord of Breteuil, and Richard, lord of Montfort, half-brother of Isabel, and—through his mother—nephew of Raoul. The war was ended in 1092 when Raoul captured St William and ransomed him for 3000 livres (about 300 kilograms or 660 pounds of fine silver) and the recognition of Raoul's son Roger as heir to both St William and Count William. (Roger died young and the issue became moot.) With Robert Curthose on crusade after September 1096, both Count William and Raoul worked together under William Rufus during his invasion of the French County of Vexin. Following William Rufus's death in 1100, they also cooperated in attacking the county of Meulan, held by Robert of Beaumont, the earl of Leicester, again at the behest of Helvise for Robert's supposed work turning the late king against their interests.

As Count William became older and somewhat feeble, Helvise—who had always possessed a great deal of influence over her husband—assumed most of the rule of Évreux directly. The couple donated lands to the Abbey of Saint Martin at Troarn and founded a new monastery at Noyon with council from Roger, abbot of St Evroul. In 1108, they laid out the foundation of a church consecrated to St Mary, although the project was not completed before their deaths. The English historian Orderic Vitalis noted that "the Countess was distinguished for her wit and beauty; she was one of the tallest women in all Evreux, and of very high birth." She was headstrong, violent, and bold in her political affairs, often ignoring the council of her husband's barons. William's fealty was transferred from the duke to King Henry I in 1104 and he fought for Henry at Tinchebray in 1106, but numerous complaints against his countess to the dukes of Normandy and kings of England led to both William and Helvise being exiled on two occasions. On one, he was exiled to Anjou in November or December 1111 but restored in the peace that led to its count Fulk V pledging fealty to Henry the next year.

Countess Helvise died in exile in 1114 and was buried at Noyon. Also in exile, Count William was "struck down by apoplexy" on 18 April 1118 and was buried in Fontenelle Abbey in St Wandrille beside his father. In his Ecclesiastical History, Orderic dwelt on William's putrification. The fact he died without children caused Henry I of England problems, since his heir Amaury III de Montfort was a vassal of Louis VI of France.

== Estates ==
According to the Domesday Book, William of Évreux held the following lands in England in 1086 as tenant-in-chief:

- Beckett, Berkshire
- Blewbury, Berkshire
- Bodicote, Oxfordshire
- Bucklebury, Berkshire
- Calcot, Berkshire
- Chippinghurst, Oxfordshire
- Dunthrop, Oxfordshire
- East Hanney, Berkshire
- East Hendred, Berkshire
- Grafton, Oxfordshire
- Milcombe, Oxfordshire
- Millington, Oxfordshire
- Sheffield Bottom, Berkshire
- Showell, Oxfordshire
- An estate in Southampton, Berkshire
- Toot Baldon, Oxfordshire
- West Hendred, Berkshire
- Westrop Green, Berkshire

He also had a number of smaller holdings which were held of other tenants-in-chief. For a list of his holdings by folio, see Keats-Rohan. The folio numbers for his holdings are found Farley.

| Preceded by Richard | Count of Évreux; 1067–1118 | Succeeded by Amaury III de Montfort |
