= Priory of Haute-Bruyère =

Priory and monastery in France

- Prieuré de Haute-Bruyère (aka prieuré Notre-Dame-des-Hautes-Bruyères)
- Interactive map of Priory of Haute-Bruyère

Monastery information
- Full name: Priory of Our Lady of Haute-Bruyère
- Other name: Priory of Haute-Bruyère
- Order: Order of Fontevrault
- Established: 1112
- Disestablished: 1790
- Dedication: Our Lady
- Diocese: Chartres

People
- Founders: Amaury III de Montfort and Bertrade de Montfort
- Important associated figures: Simon IV de Montfort, Amaury VI de Montfort, Beatrice de Montfort

Site
- Coordinates: 48°44′19″N 1°53′33″E

The Priory of Haute-Bruyère (French: Prieuré de Haute-Bruyère), also known as the Priory of Our Lady of Haute-Bruyère (Prieuré Notre-Dame-des-Hautes-Bruyères), is a monastery of the Order of Fontevrault near Saint-Rémy-l'Honoré in Yvelines, Île-de-France which received both men and women.

== History ==
The priory was founded in 1114 by Amaury III de Montfort and Bertrade de Monfort, his sister, who became a nun of the Fontevrault Order after the end of her marriage to King Philip I. All of the monasteries affiliated with the Abbey of Fontevrault had the title of priories because of their dependency on Fontevrault and they had an abbot or abbess as the sole leader of the congregation.

In the 15th century, armed bands destroyed crops in the region and the priory was abandoned.

In 1537, the priory, having been given new life, numbered 128 members. King Francis I died 31 Mar 1547 at Chateau de Rambouillet near Haute-Bruyère. His body was transported to the priory where his heart was preserved until 1852, the date it was transferred to the Basilica of Saint Denis.

From 1590 to 1591, the nuns were on trial against Etienne Fleur at the Bailiwick of Epernon for unpaid royalties and rent.

The French Revolution marked the end for the Order of Fontevrault and the Priory of Haute-Bruyère. It was closed in 1790. It was demolished and its land sold in 1794.

== Montfort Necropolis ==
Since its foundation, the priory has served as a family necropolis for the Lords and Counts of Montfort-l'Amaury. Amongst others, the following people are interred there:

- Bertrade de Montfort, Queen of the Franks, founder of the priory;
- Simon IV de Montfort, leader of the Albigensian Crusade;
- Amaury VI de Montfort (heart), Grand Constable of France, son of Simon de Montfort;
- Beatrice de Montfort, granddaughter of Amaury VI de Montfort.

== List of Prioresses ==
- 1114-1128: Bertrade de Montfort (1070-1128), retired in 1108 after the death of her husband to the Abbey of Fontevrault. She was Prioress from 1114 to her death 1128.
- 1530: Agnès de Marfin who reformed the priory.
- 1567: Michelle de Hérangue, who issued a receipt for 100 livres collected on the estate of Caen.

== Notable People Who Traveled to the Priory ==
- The youngest daughter of Gui III de Chevreuse and Aline de Corbeil in the 13th century.

== Possessions ==
=== Ranches and Farms ===
- Haute-Bruyère; Beauvais; Châtillon; Montmort; de la Justice (cattle farm); La Tasse Farm (1662-1789) in (Les Essarts-le-Roi).
- Epernon: building for the exploitation of grain and wine metering rights; this property was donated to Épernon by Guillaume de Puiseux.

=== Vineyards ===
- Courbevoie; Nanterre; Puteaux; Rueil; Suresnes.

=== Chapels, Churches and Oratories ===
An oratory at a place called Abbecourt in Orgeval was the subject of an agreement with the Abbey of Our Lady of Coloumbs.

== Description of the Buildings ==
The entrance is that of the current farm. Its lintel carries the coat of arms of the convent. Immediately on the right are the stables facing the barn that once served as a hospital. Extending from that are the buildings of the priests including the cloister, dormitory, refectory and private chapel built in 1778 and destroyed in 1794. The cemetery is below. In front of the church was the chapter house, destroyed in 1794 and replaced by house built by stones from the priory in 1798. The two cloisters are an extension of it. There was also a drinking trough.

== Sources ==
This page is a translation of fr:Prieuré de Haute-Bruyère.
