= Amaury IV =

Amaury IV can be:

- Amaury IV of Thouars (ca. 1020–1093), viscount of Thouars (1055-1093)
- Amaury IV of Montfort (+1140), lord of Montfort (1137-1140)
- Amaury IV of Évreux (+1182), count of Évreux (1181-1182)
- Amaury IV de Craon (1326-1376), viscount-consort van Thouars (1370-1376)
