= Count of Montfort =

Count of Montfort may refer to:

- Counts of Montfort (Swabia)
- Count of Montfort-l'Amaury, France
