= Lords, counts and dukes of Montfort-l'Amaury =

European nobles

This list is about the lords, counts and dukes who ruled over Montfort-l'Amaury, France.

Around ten years before 1000 AD, Robert the Pious commissioned Guillaume de Hainaut with protecting the royal domain around Paris from the counts of Blois to the west. Guillaume built a castle on a hill and called it Montfort; his son Amaury founded a town nearby which received the name of Montfort-l'Amaury, thus becoming the first seigneur of Montfort-l'Amaury.

== List of lords of Montfort-l'Amaury ==

=== House of Montfort ===
- Guillaume de Montfort (? – before 1053)
- Amaury I de Montfort (c.1003? – 1053)
- Simon I de Montfort (1053–1087)
- Amaury II de Montfort (1087–1089)
- Richard de Montfort (1089–1092)
- Simon II de Montfort (1092 – c.1101)
- Amaury III de Montfort (c.1101 – 1137)
- Amaury IV de Montfort (1137–1140)
- Simon III de Montfort (1137–1181)
- Amaury V de Montfort (1181–1182)
- Simon IV de Montfort (1183–1188)
- Simon V de Montfort, 5th Earl of Leicester (1188–1218)
- Amaury VI de Montfort (1218–1241)
- John I of Montfort (1241–1249)
- Beatrice, Countess of Montfort (1249–1311)

== List of counts and countesses of Montfort-l'Amaury ==

=== House of Montfort-Brittany ===
- Yolande of Dreux, Countess of Montfort (1311–1322)
- John IV of Montfort, Duke of Brittany (1322–1345)
- John V of Montfort, Duke of Brittany (1345–1399)
- John VI of Montfort, Duke of Brittany (1399–1427)
- Francis I, Duke of Brittany (1427–1450)
- Peter II, Duke of Brittany (1450–1457)
- Arthur III, Duke of Brittany (1457–1458)
- Richard, Count of Étampes (1458–1458)
- Francis II, Duke of Brittany (1458–1488)
- Anne of Brittany (1488–1514)
- Claude of France (1514–1524)
- Francis I of France

After Claude's death in 1524, Francis I of France inherited his wife's property under their marriage contract. This marked the end of the common fate of Brittany and Montfort. Brittany's attachment to France became definitive in 1547, although in 1524 the King already had the county of Montfort in his possession as part of the French domaine royal.

== List of dukes of Montfort-l'Amaury ==

By letters dated November 1667, King Louis XIV allowed Charles Honoré d'Albert, 3rd Duke of Luynes and his descendants, to bear the honorary title of Count of Montfort-l'Amaury, which he raised to Duke in 1692.

=== House of d'Albert de Luynes ===
- Honoré-Charles d'Albert de Luynes (born 1669–1704, killed at the Siege of Landau), son of Charles Honoré d'Albert, 3rd Duke of Luynes
- Charles Philippe d'Albert, 4th Duke of Luynes (1704–1717)
- Marie-Charles-Louis d'Albert de Luynes, 5th Duke of Luynes (1717–1771)
- Louis-Joseph-Charles-Amable d'Albert de Luynes (1771–1783)
- Charles-Paul d'Albert (1783–1789)
