= Lord High Steward =

First of the Great Officers of State in England

Lord High Steward of England
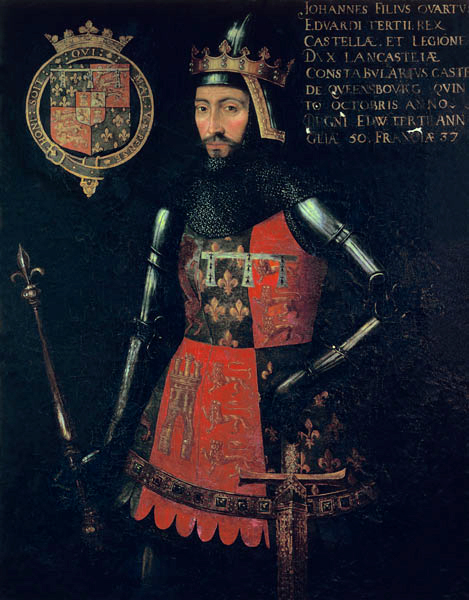
- Longest Serving; John of Gaunt; 1362–1399
- Type: Great Officer of State
- Appointer: The Monarch
- Term length: At His Majesty's Pleasure
- Formation: 1154
- First holder: The 2nd Earl of Leicester
- Superseded by: Chief Justiciar

The lord high steward is the first of the Great Officers of State in England, nominally ranking above the Lord Chancellor.

The office has generally remained vacant since 1421, and is now an ad hoc office that is primarily ceremonial and is filled only for a coronation.

At coronations of the British monarch, the Lord High Steward bears St Edward's Crown. The Lord High Steward has the sole legal power to preside over impeachment trials of peers (which last happened in 1806). The trial of peers by their peers (a law which applied for felonies) was abolished in 1948. In general, but not invariably, the Lord Chancellor was deputised (to act as Lord High Steward) in the felony trials. There was a Court of the Lord High Steward which served this purpose when Parliament was not in session.

Initially the position was largely an honorary one. It grew in importance until its holder became one of the most powerful men of the kingdom. From the late 12th century, the office was considered to be bound with the Earldom of Leicester. When the House of Lancaster ascended the throne in 1399, Henry IV made his second son, Thomas of Lancaster, Duke of Clarence, Lord High Steward. He held the post until his death in 1421.

The equivalent offices in Scotland and Ireland respectively are the Great Steward of Scotland (always held by the heir to the throne, known in Scotland as the Duke of Rothesay) and the Lord High Steward of Ireland (held by the Earls of Shrewsbury, who are also Earls of Waterford in the Peerage of Ireland).

== Lord High Stewards of England, 1154–1421 ==
- 1154–1168: Robert de Beaumont, 2nd Earl of Leicester
- 1168–1190: Robert de Beaumont "Blanchemains", 3rd Earl of Leicester
- 1190–1204: Robert de Beaumont "FitzPernel", 4th Earl of Leicester
- 1206–1218: Simon IV de Montfort, 5th Earl of Leicester (son of the sister of the previous)
- 1218–1239: uncertain, probably vacant
- 1239–1265: Simon V de Montfort, 6th Earl of Leicester (de facto ruler from c. 1259)
- 1265–1267: uncertain, probably vacant
- 1267–1274: Edward I of England (first son of Henry III)
- 1274–1296: Edmund Crouchback, 1st Earl of Leicester and of Lancaster (second son of Henry III & brother to Edward I)
- 1296–1322: Thomas, 2nd Earl of Lancaster and of Leicester (Edmund's eldest son; nephew of Edward I)
- 1322–1324: uncertain, probably vacant
- 1324–1345: Henry, 3rd Earl of Lancaster and of Leicester (Thomas' younger brother; first-cousin to Edward II)
- 1345–1361: Henry of Grosmont, 1st Duke of Lancaster, 4th Earl of Leicester (3rd Earl's son; second cousin to Edward III)
- 1362–1399: John of Gaunt, 1st Duke of Lancaster, 6th Earl of Leicester jure uxoris (third son of Edward III and son-in-law of the previous)
- 1399: Henry Bolingbroke, 2nd Duke of Lancaster, 7th Earl of Leicester (elder son of John; first cousin to Richard II, whose throne he usurped)
- 1399–1421: Thomas of Lancaster, 1st Duke of Clarence (second son of Henry IV (Bolingbroke))

== Lord High Stewards of England, 1422–present ==
Incomplete before 1660.

=== Coronations ===
Name	Year	Notes	Ref.
Humphrey, Duke of Gloucester	1429	Coronation of King Henry VI (Humphrey's nephew)	
Thomas de Courtenay, 5th/13th Earl of Devon	1445	Coronation of Margaret of Anjou	
John de la Pole, 2nd Duke of Suffolk	1461	Coronation of King Edward IV (brother of Pole's wife, Elizabeth of York)	
George Plantagenet, 1st Duke of Clarence	1465	Coronation of Elizabeth Woodville (wife of George's brother, Edward IV)	
John Howard, 1st Duke of Norfolk	1483	Coronation of King Richard III (Howard's close friend) and his wife Anne Neville	
John de Vere, 13th Earl of Oxford	1485	Coronation of King Henry VII (Vere was commander of Henry's army at the Battle of Bosworth Field)	
Jasper Tudor, Duke of Bedford	1487	Coronation of Elizabeth of York (Tudor was half-brother to the late Henry VI and paternal uncle to Henry VII)	
Edward Stafford, 3rd Duke of Buckingham	1509	Coronation of King Henry VIII and his wife Queen Catherine	
The Duke of Suffolk	1533	Coronation of Queen Anne	
The Baron Russell	1547	Coronation of King Edward VI	
The Earl of Derby	1553	Coronation of Queen Mary I	
The Earl of Arundel	1559	Coronation of Queen Elizabeth I	
The Earl of Nottingham	1603	Coronation of King James I and his wife Queen Anne	
The Duke of Buckingham	1626	Coronation of King Charles I	
The Duke of Ormond	1661	Coronation of King Charles II	
The Duke of Ormond	1685	Coronation of King James II and his wife Queen Mary	
The Earl of Devonshire	1689	Coronation of King William III and Queen Mary II	
The Duke of Devonshire	1702	Coronation of Queen Anne	
The Duke of Grafton	1714	Coronation of King George I	
The Duke of Dorset	1727	Coronation of King George II and his wife Queen Caroline	
The Earl Talbot	1761	Coronation of King George III and his wife Queen Charlotte	
The Marquess of Anglesey	1821	Coronation of King George IV	
The Duke of Hamilton and Brandon	1831	Coronation of King William IV and his wife Queen Adelaide	
The Duke of Hamilton and Brandon	1838	Coronation of Queen Victoria	
The Duke of Marlborough	1902	Coronation of King Edward VII and his wife Queen Alexandra	
The Duke of Northumberland	1911	Coronation of King George V and his wife Queen Mary	
The Marquess of Salisbury	1937	Coronation of King George VI and his wife Queen Elizabeth	
The Viscount Cunningham of Hyndhope	1953	Coronation of Queen Elizabeth II	
Sir Gordon Messenger	2023	Coronation of King Charles III and his wife Queen Camilla	

=== Trials of peers ===
Name	Year	Notes	Ref.
Henry Stafford, 2nd Duke of Buckingham	1478	Trial of George, Duke of Clarence (brother of Edward IV, whose ward Stafford was)	
John de Vere, 13th Earl of Oxford	1499	Trial of Edward Plantagenet, 17th Earl of Warwick (the last male-line Yorkist)	
Thomas Howard, 2nd Duke of Norfolk	1503	Trial of Edward Sutton, 2nd Baron Dudley	
Thomas Howard, 2nd Duke of Norfolk	1521	Trial of Edward Stafford, 3rd Duke of Buckingham	
Thomas Howard, 3rd Duke of Norfolk	1534	Trial of William Dacre, 3rd Baron Dacre	
Thomas Howard, 3rd Duke of Norfolk	1536	Trial of Anne Boleyn (Howard's niece)	
Henry Courtenay, 1st Marquess of Exeter	1537	Trial of Thomas Darcy, 1st Baron Darcy de Darcy (Courtenay was a first-cousin to Henry VIII)	
Thomas Audley, 1st Baron Audley of Walden	1538	Trial of Henry Pole, 1st Baron Montagu and Henry Courtenay, 1st Marquess of Exeter (cousins; scions of the House of York)	
Thomas Audley, 1st Baron Audley of Walden	1541	Trial of Thomas Fiennes, 9th Baron Dacre	
William Paulet, 1st Marquess of Winchester	1551	Trial of Edward Seymour, 1st Duke of Somerset (fallen Lord Protector, regent and uncle of Edward VI; Paulet was one of the 16 executors)	
Thomas Howard, 3rd Duke of Norfolk	1553	Trial of John Dudley, 1st Duke of Northumberland (fallen regent)	
Henry FitzAlan, 19th Earl of Arundel	1557	Trial of Lord Stourton (FitzAlan was a godson of Henry VIII; Stourton a nephew of Dudley)	
William Parr, 1st Marquess of Northampton	1559	Trial of Thomas Wentworth, 2nd Baron Wentworth (Parr was brother to the late queen Catherine; Wentworth a cousin of Seymour)	
George Talbot, 6th Earl of Shrewsbury	1571	Trial of Thomas Howard, 4th Duke of Norfolk	
William Paulet, 3rd Marquess of Winchester	1587	Funeral of Mary, Queen of Scots (Paulet was a judge at her trial)	
Henry Stanley, 4th Earl of Derby	1589	Trial of Philip Howard, 20th Earl of Arundel	
Thomas Sackville, 1st Baron Buckhurst	1601	Trial of Robert Devereux, 2nd Earl of Essex (a favourite of Elizabeth I)	
Thomas Coventry, 1st Baron Coventry	1631	Trial of Mervyn Tuchet, 2nd Earl of Castlehaven (Coventry was Lord Keeper)	
Thomas Howard, 21st Earl of Arundel	1641	Trial of Thomas Wentworth, 1st Earl of Strafford (Howard was the Earl Marshal; Wentworth the former Deputy of Ireland)	
Edward Hyde, 1st Earl of Clarendon (Lord Chancellor)	1666	Trial of Thomas Park, 15th Baron Morley (Hyde was a member of Charles' exile court)	
Heneage Finch, 1st Baron Finch (Lord Chancellor)	1676	Trial of Charles Cornwallis, 3rd Baron Cornwallis	
Heneage Finch, 1st Baron Finch (Lord Chancellor)		Trial of Philip Herbert, 7th Earl of Pembroke	
Heneage Finch, 1st Baron Finch (Lord Chancellor)	1679	Trial of Thomas Osborne, 1st Earl of Danby (later 1st Duke of Leeds)	
Heneage Finch, 1st Baron Finch (Lord Chancellor)	1679	Trial of William Herbert, 1st Earl of Powis; William Howard, 1st Viscount Stafford; Henry Arundell, 3rd Baron Arundell of Wardour; William Petre, 4th Baron Petre; and John Belasyse, 1st Baron Belasyse	
Heneage Finch, 1st Baron Finch (Lord Chancellor)	1680	Trial of William Howard, 1st Viscount Stafford,	
George Jeffreys, 1st Baron Jeffreys (Lord Chancellor)	1686	Trial of Henry Booth, 2nd Baron Delamere	
Thomas Osborne, 1st Marquess of Carmarthen (later 1st Duke of Leeds) (Lord President of the Council)	1693	Trial of Charles Mohun, 4th Baron Mohun	
John Somers, 1st Baron Somers (Lord Chancellor)	1699	Trial of Edward Rich, 6th Earl of Warwick; and of Charles Mohun, 4th Baron Mohun	
William Cowper, 1st Baron Cowper (Lord Chancellor)	1716	Trial of James Radclyffe, 3rd Earl of Derwentwater; William Widdrington, 4th Baron Widdrington; William Maxwell, 5th Earl of Nithsdale; Robert Dalzell, 5th Earl of Carnwath; William Gordon, 6th Viscount of Kenmure; and William Murray, 2nd Lord Nairne	
William Cowper, 1st Baron Cowper (Lord Chancellor)	1716	Trial of George Seton, 5th Earl of Winton	
William Cowper, 1st Baron Cowper (Lord Chancellor)	1717	Trial of Robert Harley, 1st Earl of Oxford and Earl Mortimer	
Peter King, 1st Baron King (Lord Chancellor)	1725	Trial of Thomas Parker, 1st Earl of Macclesfield	
Philip Yorke, 1st Earl of Hardwicke (Lord Chancellor)	1746	Trial of William Boyd, 4th Earl of Kilmarnock; George Mackenzie, 3rd Earl of Cromartie; and Arthur Elphinstone, 6th Lord Balmerino	
Philip Yorke, 1st Earl of Hardwicke (Lord Chancellor)	1747	Trial of Simon Fraser, 11th Lord Lovat	
Robert Henley, 1st Baron Henley (Lord Keeper)	1760	Trial of Laurence Shirley, 4th Earl Ferrers	
Robert Henley, 1st Earl of Northington (Lord Chancellor)	1765	Trial of William Byron, 5th Baron Byron	
Henry Bathurst, 2nd Earl Bathurst (Lord Chancellor)	1776	Trial of Elizabeth Pierrepont, Duchess of Kingston-upon-Hull	
Edward Thurlow, 1st Baron Thurlow (Lord Chancellor; until 1793)	1788–1795	Trial of Warren Hastings	
Alexander Wedderburn, 1st Baron Loughborough (Lord Chancellor; from 1793)	1788–1795	Trial of Warren Hastings	
Thomas Erskine, 1st Baron Erskine (Lord Chancellor)	1806	Trial of Henry Dundas, 1st Viscount Melville	
Thomas Denman, 1st Baron Denman (Lord Chief Justice of the Queen's Bench)	1841	Trial of James Brudenell, 7th Earl of Cardigan	
Hardinge Giffard, 1st Earl of Halsbury (Lord Chancellor)	1901	Trial of Frank Russell, 2nd Earl Russell	
John Lambton, 3rd Earl of Durham	1911–1912	Lord High Steward to George V during his visit to India from 1911 to 1912	
Douglas Hogg, 1st Viscount Hailsham (Lord Chancellor)	1935	Trial of Edward Russell, 26th Baron de Clifford (last trial of a peer in the House of Lords)	
