= Simon V =

Simon V may refer to:

- Simon de Montfort, 5th Earl of Leicester (c. 1175 – 1218)
- Simon de Montfort, 6th Earl of Leicester (c. 1208 - 1265)
- Simon V, Count of Lippe (1511–1536)
