= Robert de Beaumont, 4th Earl of Leicester =

English nobleman

Arms of Robert de Beaumont, 4th Earl of Leicester, adopted at the start of the age of heraldry, c. 1200–15: Gules, a cinquefoil pierced ermine. Today the arms of the City of Leicester

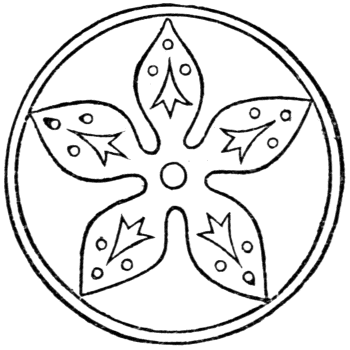
Seal of Robert de Beaumont, 4th Earl of Leicester: A cinquefoil pierced ermine

Robert de Beaumont, 4th Earl of Leicester (died circa 21 October 1204) (Latinized to de Bellomonte ("from the beautiful mountain")) was an English nobleman, the last of the Beaumont earls of Leicester. He is sometimes known as Robert FitzPernel.

== Life ==
Robert was the eldest surviving son of Robert de Beaumont, 3rd Earl of Leicester and Petronilla de Grandmesnil, who was either a granddaughter or great-granddaughter of Hugh de Grandmesnil. Robert's older brother died in 1189. As a young man, he accompanied King Richard I of England on the Third Crusade, and it was while the crusading forces rested at Messina, Sicily that Robert was invested with the Earldom of Leicester on 2 February 1191, following the death of his father in 1190 at Durazzo while on his way to the Holy Land.

Robert's newly gained estates included a large part of central Normandy. He held castles at Pacy, Pont-Saint-Pierre and Grandmesnil. Earl Robert also was lord of the vast honour of Breteuil, but the family castle there had been dismantled after the 1173-1174 War. On his return from the crusade, he turned his attention to the defence of Normandy from the French. After defending Rouen from the advances of Philip II of France, he attempted to retake his castle of Pacy. He was captured by forces of the French king and remained imprisoned for 3 years. Later, King John would bestow the new fortress and lordship of Radepont (the land of Radepont was traded to King John by the seigneur du Neubourg for lands and revenues in the pays de Caux) upon the earl.

Sometime after his release in 1196, he married Loretta de Braose, daughter of William de Braose, 4th Lord of Bramber. They had no children, and Robert's death in 1204 brought the end of the Beaumont male line.

In the year of his death, Normandy was lost to the French; Earl Robert attempted to come to an independent arrangement with King Philip of France, in which he would hold his land in Normandy as a liege-vassal of the Kings of France, and his lands in England as a liege-vassal of the Kings of England. In any event, Robert died on 20 or 21 October 1204, and his large English estates were divided between the heirs of his two sisters. The eldest sister, Amice, had married the French baron Simon de Montfort, and their son, also named Simon de Montfort, inherited half the estate as well as the title of Earl of Leicester. The younger sister, Margaret, had married Saer de Quincy, and they inherited the other half. Three years later Saer was created Earl of Winchester.

Honorary titles
Preceded by Robert de Beaumont	Lord High Steward; 1190–1204	Succeeded by Simon de Montfort
Peerage of England
Preceded by Robert de Beaumont	Earl of Leicester; 1190–1204	Succeeded by Simon de Montfort
