= Monteforte =

Monteforte is a surname. Notable people with the surname include:

- Edoardo Monteforte (1849–1933), Italian painter
- Mario Monteforte Toledo (1911–2003), Guatemalan writer, dramatist and politician

== See also ==
- Places in Italy:
  - Monteforte Cilento, in the province of Salerno
  - Monteforte d'Alpone, in the province of Verona
  - Monteforte Irpino, in the province of Avellino
- Montfort (disambiguation)
- Monforte (disambiguation)
