= Simon de Montfort (disambiguation) =

Simon de Montfort, 6th Earl of Leicester (c. 1208 – 1265), known as Simon V or VI de Montfort, was an Anglo-French nobleman who led the rebellion against King Henry III.

Simon de Montfort may also refer to:

- Simon I of Montfort (c. 1025–1087), Lord of Montfort l'Amaury
- Simon II of Montfort (c. 1068–1104), Lord of Montfort l'Amaury, son of Simon I
- Simon III of Montfort (1117–1181), "the Bald", Count of Évreux and Lord of Montfort l'Amaury, nephew of Simon II
- Simon de Montfort (died 1188) or Simon IV de Montfort, Lord of Montfort l'Amaury, son of Simon III
- Simon de Montfort, 5th Earl of Leicester (c. 1175–1218), also known as Simon de Montfort the Elder, a military leader in the Fourth Crusade and the Albigensian Crusade
- Simon de Montfort the Younger (1240–1271), second son of the 6th Earl (Simon VI or VII)
- Simon de Montford, English nobleman executed in 1495, unrelated to the above
- Simon de Montfort (game), a 1979 wargame
