= Richard of Montfort =

French noble

Richard de Montfort
- Seigneur of Montfort
- Reign: 1089-1092
- Predecessor: Amaury II de Montfort
- Successor: Simon II de Montfort
- Noble family: House of Montfort
- Father: Simon I de Montfort
- Mother: Agnès d'Évreux

Richard of Montfort or Richard de Montfort (c. 1065–1091) was a French nobleman from the House of Montfort who briefly ruled as lord of Montfort (1089–1091) in Normandy. He took the part of Count William of Évreux during his private war with Raoul II, lord of Conches. As Richard had no children at the time of his death, the lordship passed to his brother Simon II.

== Life ==
Richard was born c. 1065 at Montfort in Île-de-France, France. He was a son of Simon I (c. 1025–1087), lord of Montfort, and Agnes of Évreux (c. 1030 – c. 1087), daughter of Richard, count of Évreux.

Upon the death of his father in 1087 and his half-brother Amaury II in 1089, he succeeded them as the lord of Montfort-l'Amaury. Richard's half-sister Isabel had married Raoul II of Tosny, lord of Conches, but feuded with Helvise of Nevers, wife of Raoul's half-brother William, count of Évreux. In this dispute, Richard took the side of William of Évreux and was killed while raiding St Pierre Abbey (Abbaye Saint-Pierre) in Conches in November 1091. He was buried at Épernon in what is now Eure-et-Loir. Dying childless, he left the lordship of Montfort to his brother Simon II.

Preceded by Amaury II	Seigneur of Montfort; 1089-1092	Succeeded by Simon II
