= Amaury III of Montfort =

French nobleman

Amaury III de Montfort
- Seigneur of Montfort
- Reign: c. 1101–1137
- Predecessor: Simon II de Montfort
- Successor: Simon III de Montfort
- Died: 18 or 19 April 1137
- Buried: Fontevraud Abbey, Priory of Haute-Bruyère, Kingdom of France
- Noble family: House of Montfort
- Spouses: Richilde de Hainaut; Agnès de Garlande
- Issue: Amaury IV de Montfort, Count of Évreux (but not lord of Montfort); Simon III de Montfort, lord of Montfort and Count of Évreux; Agnès, Dame de Gournay-sur-Marne
- Father: Simon I de Montfort
- Mother: Agnès d'Évreux

Amaury III de Montfort (d. 18 or 19 April 1137) was a French nobleman, the Seigneur of Montfort-l'Amaury, Épernon, and Houdan in the Île-de-France (1101–c. 1137) and Count of Évreux in Normandy (1118–c. 1137).

== Life ==
Amaury was the son of Simon I, seigneur de Montfort, and Agnès d'Évreux, daughter of Richard, Count of Évreux. In 1098, William Rufus was campaigning in France and crossed into the French Vexin. One of the first castles he attacked was that of Houdan, which Amaury defended. Amaury quickly surrendered and joined William's army. He then aided William against his brother Simon II de Montfort's castles of Montfort-l'Amaury and Épernon. Simon and the other castellans successfully defended themselves against the forces of William Rufus until a truce was called and William returned to England. When Simon II died c. 1101, Amaury succeeded him as seigneur de Montfort.

When Amaury's maternal uncle William, Count of Évreux died in 1118, he left no direct heirs, so Henry I of England seized his lands. Amaury was Henry's most detested enemy. His sister was the notorious Bertrade de Montfort, his nephew was Fulk V of Anjou, and his kinsman King Louis VI of France was related to him by marriage. Amaury had induced his nephew Fulk V to attack Henry's territories in the past while the French and English kings were at odds again. Amaury was the last person he wanted holding a countship in the center of Normandy. After complaining to Louis VI, the French king granted the countship of Évreux to Amaury. For six months, Henry kept Amaury out of Évreux and denied him the county by keeping the castle garrisoned with his own troops until his constable, William Pointel, turned the castle over to his longtime friend Amaury while Henry was in Rouen. Finally, Henry offered Amaury the countship of Évreux if he would surrender the castle. Amaury refused, and the rebellion continued with Amaury now encouraging more Normans to defy Henry.

In 1119, Henry besieged the castle of Évreux anew, but Theobald II, Count of Champagne, Henry's nephew, negotiated a truce between them. Amaury surrendered the castle to the King and, on doing so, was confirmed as count of Évreux by Henry. The following year, Amaury fought at the battle of Bourgtheroulde, supporting William Clito against Henry I but was captured fleeing the field by William de Grandcourt. Rather than turn over his prisoner to Henry, however, William decided to go into exile with Amaury. Amaury made peace with the King later that same year and for the rest of Henry's reign remained on good terms with him.

== Marriages and children ==
Amaury married firstly, Mabel. Amaury married secondly, Richilde de Hainaut, daughter of Baudouin II, comte de Hainaut but repudiated her in 1118. They had:

- daughter married Hugh de Crecy
- daughter, nun at Fontevraud

In 1118 Amaury remarried, to Agnès de Garlande, daughter of Anseau de Garlande, Count de Rochefort. Their children were:

- Amaury IV († 1140), Count of Évreux
- Simon III († 1181), lord of Montfort and Count of Évreux
- Agnès († 1181), Dame de Gournay-sur-Marne, married Waleran de Beaumont, 1st Earl of Worcester († 1166)

== Sources ==
- Barlow, Frank (1983). William Rufus. University of California Press.
- Cokayne, George Edward (1929). Doubleday, H. A.; de Walden, Howard (eds.). The Complete Peerage; or, a History of the House of Lords and all its Members from the Earliest Times. Vol. VII. St. Catherine Press.
- Hollister, C. Warren (2003). Henry I. Yale University Press.
- Neveux, François (2008). A Brief History of The Normans. Translated by Curtis, Howard. Constable & Robinson.
- Power, Daniel (2004). The Norman Frontier in the Twelfth and Early Thirteenth Centuries. Cambridge University Press.

| Preceded by Simon II | Seigneur of Montfort; 1101–1137 | Succeeded by Simon III |
| Preceded by William | Count of Évreux; 1118–1137 | Succeeded by Amaury IV |
