= Épernon =

- Commune
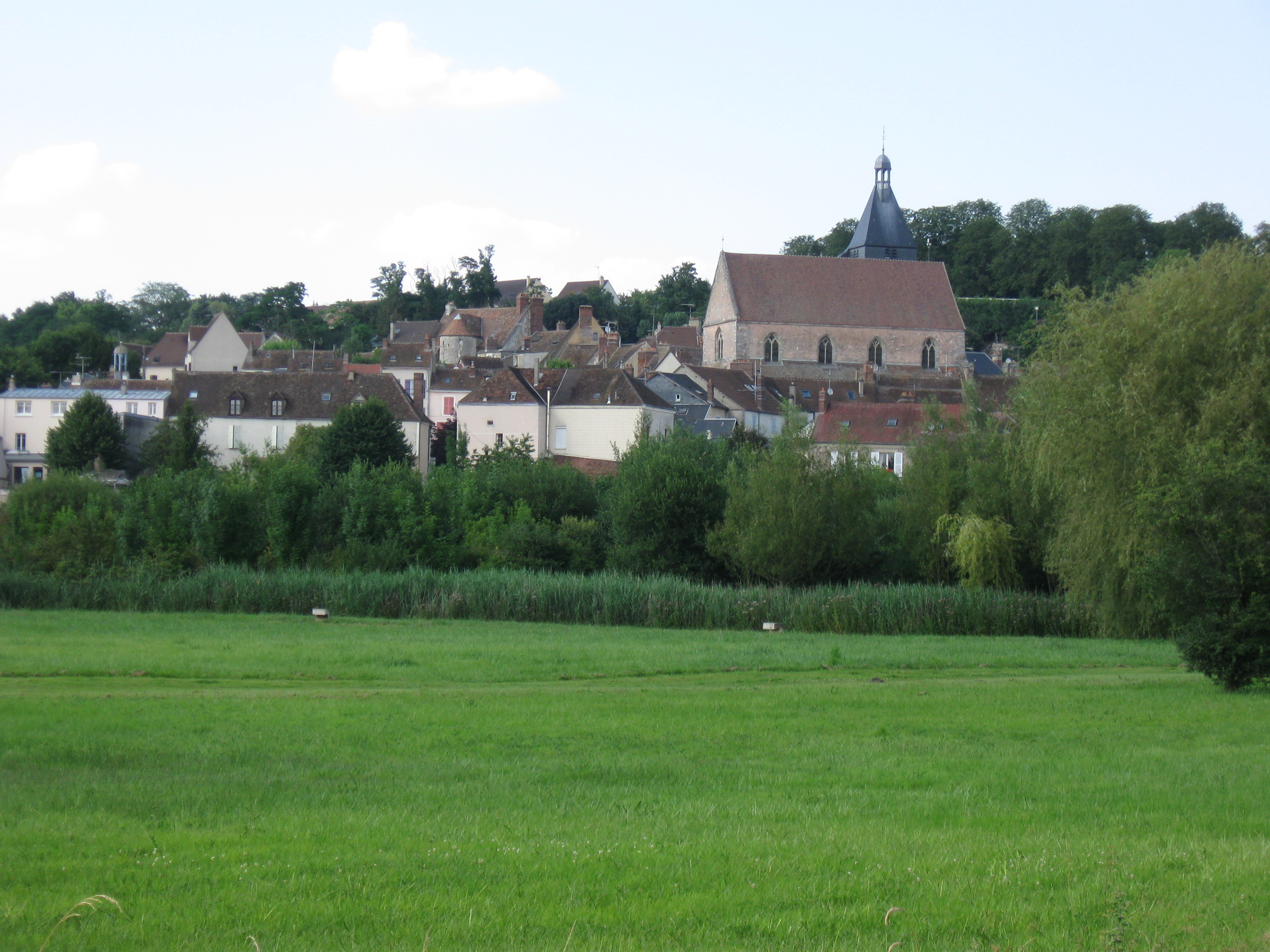
- View from the prairie

- Coat of arms
- Location of Épernon
- Location within France Location within Centre-Val de Loire
- Coordinates: 48°36′41″N 1°40′30″E
- Country: France
- Region: Centre-Val de Loire
- Department: Eure-et-Loir
- Arrondissement: Chartres
- Canton: Épernon
- Intercommunality: Portes Euréliennes d'Île-de-France

Government
  - Mayor (2020–2026): François Belhomme
- Area^{1}: 6.43 km^{2} (2.48 sq mi)
- Highest elevation: 165 m (541 ft)
- Lowest elevation: 110 m (360 ft)
- Population (2023): 5,715
  - Density: 889/km^{2} (2,300/sq mi)
- Time zone: UTC+01:00 (CET)
  - Summer (DST): UTC+02:00 (CEST)
- INSEE/Postal code: 28140 /28230
- ^{1} French Land Register data, which excludes lakes, ponds, glaciers > 1 km^{2} (0.386 sq mi or 247 acres) and river estuaries.

Épernon (French pronunciation: [epɛʁnɔ̃]) is a French commune in the Eure-et-Loir department, Centre-Val de Loire. It lies some 27 kilometres (17 mi) northeast of Chartres, at the confluence of the Drouette and the Guesle.

== History ==
Épernon was originally the home of the counts of Montfort and Amaury. In the 11th century, they raised the fortresses of Épernon and Montfort for the protection of the Château de St Léger and granted a charter to the town. Four gates gave access to the medieval city: the gate of Chartres, the gate of Geolle, the gate of Paris and the gate of Beauce. Above the gates an inscription paid homage to the village that previously existed there: Autrist fut jadis mon nom/A présent on me nomme Espierremont (Autrist was once my name/now my name is Espierremont). Charters of the 12th and 13th century variously refer to the town as Sparno and Sparnonum, but by the 14th century it had evolved to Esparnon and Espernon, very close to its present appellation.

In the 13th century it became an independent lordship, which remained attached to the crown of Navarre till, in the 16th century, it was sold by Henry III of France to Jean Louis de Nogaret de La Valette, for whom it was raised to the rank of a duchy in 1581. De Nogaret's second son, Bernard (1592–1661), succeeded his father to the dukedom and after his death, the title was borne by the families of Goth and of Pardaillan.

The Marquis de Sade wished to be buried in an unmarked grave on his family property in Épernon; however, his instructions were not followed and he is buried in Charenton.

== Épernon today ==
Although the Montforts were an important family and Épernon was an important duchy up through the 17th century, its location on the fringes of its greater neighbors of Chartres, Nantes and others left it somewhat passed over for a time. The population in 1999 was 5,498 but it is enjoying something of a resurgence as a fast-growing high-tech industrial center. At the industrial park of Val Drouette 3,000 people find employment.

== Education ==
The town is endowed with one secondary school named after the French mathematician Michel Chasles and which was founded in 1973. It is located on the Boulevard Michel Chasles and is composed of three buildings (A, B and C).

== Population ==
Historical population
Year	Pop.	±% p.a.
1968	3,329	—
1975	4,200	+3.38%
1982	4,950	+2.37%
1990	5,097	+0.37%
1999	5,498	+0.85%
2007	5,228	−0.63%
2012	5,476	+0.93%
2017	5,551	+0.27%
2023	5,715	+0.49%
Source: INSEE

== See also ==
- Communes of the Eure-et-Loir department
- Jean Louis de Nogaret de La Valette
