= Amaury III of Évreux =

Norman nobleman

Amaury III (died c. 1191) was the Count of Évreux in Normandy from 1181 until his death. He belonged to the elder line of the Montfort family, and is sometimes known as Amaury V de Montfort.

Amaury was the eldest son of Simon III, lord of Montfort-l'Amaury and count of Évreux, and his wife Matilda. On Simon's death in 1181, the Montfort inheritance was divided. Amaury retained the county of Évreux and lands in England, but his younger brother Simon (IV) inherited Montfort in Île-de-France. Amaury was also related by marriage to Saher de Quincy, who was in Évreux in 1181 to witness an act of Amaury's.

Amaury married Mabel, the eldest daughter and heiress of William fitz Robert, Earl of Gloucester, and Hawise de Beaumont. They had a son, Amaury IV (VI). Although Amaury had a clear claim to the earldom after William's death in 1183, it was occupied by King Henry II. Likewise, there is no evidence that any of William's men ever attached themselves to Amaury's retinue so long as the earldom was controlled by the king.

Amaury died on the Third Crusade sometime between 1187 and 1193, probably in 1191. The obituary of the Cathedral of Évreux mentions his death right after his father's under March 13 without naming the year, specifying that he left the church forty solidi. His son Amaury was still a minor at his accession and seems never to have actually ruled in Évreux, which was seized by Philip II of France in 1199. He did, however, make good on his mother's claim to Gloucester, which his father never had.

Preceded by Simon III	Count of Évreux; 1181–1187/93	Succeeded by Amaury VI
