= Amaury II of Montfort =

French noble

Aumary II de Montfort
- Seigneur of Montfort
- Reign: 1087-1089
- Predecessor: Simon I de Montfort
- Successor: Richard de Montfort
- Noble family: House of Montfort
- Father: Simon I de Montfort
- Mother: Isabel de Broyes

Amaury II (d. 1089) was the fourth lord of Montfort-l'Amaury, a castle in the territory that eventually became modern-day France.

He was the son of Simon I, Lord of Montfort, and Isabel de Broyes.

He succeeded his father and died soon after. He, in turn, was succeeded by his half brother Richard de Montfort.

== Bibliography ==
- Hadrot, Marie-Huguette (2002). Montfort l'Amaury: de l'an mil à nos jours. Paris, France: SOMOGY (ADL). ISBN 2-85056-563-6.

Preceded by Simon I	Seigneur of Montfort; 1087-1089	Succeeded by Richard
