= Guy de Montfort, Lord of Sidon =

Lord of Sidon

Guy de Montfort (died 31 January 1228) was the younger son of Simon de Montfort and Amicia, sister of Robert FitzPernel, Earl of Leicester.

== Crusade ==
In 1189 he took part in the Third Crusade, and probably remained in the Holy Land until 1192, when Richard the Lionheart returned home. By 1200 or 1201 Guy was acting with his elder brother Simon. By 1202 he held the lordships of Ferté-Alais, Castres-en-Albigeois, and Brétencourt. In that year he and his brother Simon left on the Fourth Crusade, but they disagreed with the Siege of Zara (an attack on a Christian city), and refused to take part in the plan to restore Byzantine Emperor Isaac II Angelus in return for Byzantine money and troops.

They deserted to Emeric, King of Hungary, and eventually the two continued on to Palestine. After arriving at Jaffa, they took part in King Amalric II of Jerusalem's expedition into Galilee. Amalric rewarded Guy's service by arranging his marriage to la dame de Saete (the lady of Sagette), Helvis of Ibelin, the widow of Reginald, Lord of Sidon (which the French called Saete/Sagette). He exercised the regency of Sidon on behalf of his minor stepson Balian until 1210, probably when Balian came of age. Guy then assisted at the coronation of John of Brienne as King of Jerusalem that year.

== Albigensian Crusade ==
Guy later returned home and took part in the Albigensian Crusade led by his brother, Simon de Montfort, 5th Earl of Leicester. In 1212 they led an unsuccessful siege against Montségur, and in 1213 they participated in the Battle of Muret. They also besieged Beaucaire in 1216. Simon was aiding Guy, who had been injured by a crossbow bolt, at the Siege of Toulouse on 25 June 1218 when he was struck in the head by a stone from a mangonel and killed. The death of Simon and the incompetence of his son Amaury de Montfort invigorated the Albigensian lords.

In 1224 Amaury ceded all his territory to Louis VIII of France, who soon arrived to stake his claim. Guy assisted him at the Siege of Avignon, after which Louis died on the way home. Later in the Crusade, Guy himself was killed in battle at Varilhes near Pamiers in 1228. He was taken to the abbey of Haute-Bruyère for burial and the necrology there records a conte Gui de Sagette (count Guy of Sidon).

== Marriage ==
By his first wife, Helvis of Ibelin he had;

- Philip Ι, who stayed in the Holy Land and became Lord of Tyre.
- Pernelle, who became a nun at the abbey of Saint-Antoine des Champs in Paris.

Guy remarried to Briende de Beynes, the widow of Lambert de Thury, lord of Lombers.

With Briende he had;

- Alicia, became a nun at Port-Royal
- Agnes, became a nun at Port-Royal
- Guy II of Montfort, died on crusade in 1254.
