= Simon de Montfort (died 1188) =

Lord of Montfort-l'Amaury from 1181 to 1188

- Died: 1188
- Noble family: House of Montfort
- Spouse: Amicia
- Issue: Simon de Montfort, 5th Earl of Leicester; Guy de Montfort, Lord of Sidon; Petronilla (Pernel) de Montfort
- Father: Simon III of Montfort
- Mother: Matilda

Simon de Montfort (died 1188), sometimes known as Simon IV (Note: His son the 5th Earl is also sometimes known as Simon IV. The discrepancy in numbering arises from confusion between Simon III de Montfort (died 1181) and his son (the subject of this article, died 1188). The latter was historically unknown, and Simon III was believed to be the father (not the grandfather) of the 5th Earl, who is therefore known as Simon IV in some sources and Simon V in others.) de Montfort, was lord of Montfort-l'Amaury from 1181 to 1188. He was the son of Simon III de Montfort, Count of Évreux and Lord of Montfort-l'Amaury. On his death, Simon III left the comté of Évreux to his elder son Amaury V, and his French properties in Montfort-l'Amaury and Rochefort-en-Yvelines to Simon.

Montfort married Amicia, daughter of Robert de Beaumont, 3rd Earl of Leicester. They had two sons and a daughter:

- Simon de Montfort, 5th Earl of Leicester
- Guy de Montfort, Lord of Sidon
- Petronilla (Pernel) de Montfort, wife of Barthélemy de Roye

== Notes ==
Preceded by Simon III	Seigneur of Montfort; 1181–1188	Succeeded by Simon de Montfort, 5th Earl of Leicester
