= Amaury IV of Évreux =

French noble

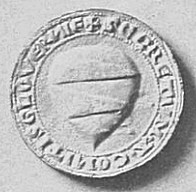
Seal of Amaury as Earl of Gloucester

Amaury IV (died c.1213) was the Count of Évreux in France from about 1191 until 1200 and then Earl of Gloucester in England from 1200 until his death. Although he was the fourth Count of Évreux named Amaury, he is sometimes numbered Amaury VI de Montfort, as the sixth of his lineage in the House of Montfort.

== Career ==
Amaury IV was the son of Count Amaury III of Évreux and his wife, Mabel, eldest daughter and co-heiress of Earl William of Gloucester. His father died on the Third Crusade between 1187 and 1193 and he inherited Évreux, including the honour of Gravenchon. In 1193–94, Évreux was briefly occupied by royal French troops. Amaury's mother died in 1198 and her portion of the earldom of Gloucester and a claim to the title passed to him. As of 29 September 1198, Amaury was still a minor. During his minority, Évreux may have been governed by officials of the Duke of Normandy, Amaury's feudal overlord. In 1195, Mabel paid a fee for the right to have custody of her son and his lands. Ducal officials may only have entered Évreux after her death. In 1198, a custodian, Richard d'Argences, was administering justice in the county and the revenues were going to the Norman exchequer.

Despite Mabel's status as the eldest daughter, the earldom of Gloucester was in the hands of Count John of Mortain, husband of the youngest co-heiress, Isabelle. In April 1199, John became king of England. That same month, Philip II of France invaded Évreux. In the Treaty of Le Goulet (May 1200), John ceded Évreux to Philip and forced Amaury to quitclaim it. As compensation, Amaury received his mother's inheritance and the earldom of Gloucester, although he only gradually took control of the lands. Most of it was still in John's hands as late as 1204. The Gloucester lands included some small fiefs in Normandy: Sainte-Scolasse, Évrecy and Thaon. All these, as well as Gravenchon, were lost to Philip of France by 1204–05.

A new Anglo-French war over Normandy broke out in 1202, and initially, Amaury joined his father-in-law on the side of King John. In May 1203, perhaps disgusted by John's murder of Arthur of Brittany, the two went into revolt. Amaury may have hoped to regain Évreux from King Philip. Whatever the motives, the rebellion was over in a few months and the principals suffered few consequences from King John.

== Marriage ==
Amaury's wife was Melisende (Millicent), a daughter of Hugh III de Gournay. She brought him Sotteville-sur-Mer in Normandy and Houghton Regis in England as her dowry. Out of his Gloucester inheritance, Amaury made donations to Missenden Abbey, long patronised by the Gournays, and made a gift to a certain Richard Talbot, a relative of the Gournays. On his death, he left Melisende the manors of Petersfield and Mapledurham as a dower. By 1216, she had remarried to William II de Cantilupe (died 1251), baron of Eaton Bray in Bedfordshire. In 1255 she became custodian of the fifteen-year-old Margaret, daughter of Henry III of England and queen of Alexander III of Scotland. She died in 1260.

== Letter ==
Some time between 1200 and his death in 1213, Amaury is thought to have written a letter to a wine merchant requesting to purchase 5 tuns of wine for 20 s. each:

A., earl of Gloucester, to his beloved A., vintner of C., greetings and love. Since whatever we have owed you for wine bought on credit on many occasions we have always paid in full on your day, and nothing is in arrears, the more confidently in this present business we have turned to you, asking earnestly that you accommodate us with five tuns of wine, namely, two of Gascon and three of Angevin, at a price of 20s. each, until Palm Sunday. You will know that we shall pay your money on the day named without any argument or delay; therefore, may you act in such a manner that we shall be bound to you in gratitude. Farewell.

== Sources ==
- Baldwin, John W. (1986). The Government of Philip Augustus: Foundations of French Royal Power in the Middle Ages. University of California Press.
- Carlin, Martha; Crouch, David (2013). Lost Letters of Medieval Life: English Society, 1200–1250. University of Pennsylvania Press. ISBN 978-0-8122-0756-9.
- Holden, B. W. (2004). "Cantilupe [Cantelupe], William de (d. 1251), baron and administrator". Oxford Dictionary of National Biography (online ed.). Oxford University Press. doi:10.1093/ref:odnb/4573. (Subscription, Wikipedia Library access or UK public library membership required.)
- Power, Daniel (2004). The Norman Frontier in the Twelfth and Early Thirteenth Centuries. Cambridge University Press.
- Sanders, I. J. (1960). English Baronies: A Study of their Origin and Descent 1086–1327. Oxford University Press.
