= Simon I of Montfort =

French nobleman (c. 1025–1087)

Simon I de Montfort
- Seigneur of Montfort
- Reign: 1053–1087
- Predecessor: Amaury I de Montfort
- Successor: Amaury II de Montfort
- Born: c. 1025; Montfort l'Amaury, Kingdom of France
- Died: 25 September 1087 (aged 61–62)
- Buried: Épernon, Kingdom of France
- Noble family: House of Montfort
- Spouses: Isabel de Broyes; Agnes d'Evreux
- Issue: Bertrade de Montfort; Richard de Montfort; Simon II de Montfort; Amaury III de Montfort; Guillaume de Montfort; Adeliza de Montfort
- Father: Amaury I de Montfort
- Mother: Bertrade

Simon I of Montfort or Simon de Montfort (c. 1025 – 25 September 1087) was a French nobleman. He was born in Montfort l'Amaury, near Paris, and became its lord. He was the son of Amaury I de Montfort and Bertrade. At his death he was buried about 20 miles (32 km) away in Épernon, because it was the site of the fortress he was instrumental in constructing.

== Progeny ==
Simon I first married Isabel de Broyes (b. 1034 in Broyes, Marne), daughter of Hugh Bardoul. Their children were:

- Amaury II de Montfort (c. 1056 – 1089), lord of Montfort
- Isabel (Elizabeth) de Montfort (b. 1057), who married Raoul II de Tosny, a companion of William the Conqueror.

Simon I's second marriage was to Agnes d'Évreux (b. 1030), daughter of Richard, Count of Évreux. Their children were:

- Bertrade de Montfort (c. 1059 – 1117), became queen of France.
- Richard de Montfort (c. 1066 – 1092), lord of Montfort, slain in attack on abbey at Conches.
- Simon II de Montfort (c. 1068 – 1104), lord of Montfort
- Amaury III de Montfort (c. 1070 – 1137), lord of Montfort and Count of Évreux.
- Guillaume de Montfort (c. 1073–1101), bishop of Paris.
- Adeliza de Montfort (b. 1075)

Preceded by Amaury I	Lord of Montfort [fr] ?–1087	Succeeded by Amaury II
