= Alix de Montmorency =

French noblewoman

Alix de Montmorency (died 24 February 1220/1221) was a French noblewoman. Her parents were Bouchard V de Montmorency and Laurette, daughter of Baldwin IV, Count of Hainaut and Alice of Namur.

== Life ==
In 1190 Alix married Simon de Montfort (c. 1175 – 25 June 1218), who later became the 5th Earl of Leicester. She accompanied her husband on his campaigns during the Albigensian Crusade and like her husband, she was very pious. Both of them had come under the influence of Fulk of Neuilly and they were patrons of the Dominican Order.

== Albigensian Crusade ==
Alix participated in the councils of the crusaders and recruited reinforcements in France. In 1217, she imprisoned the Jews in Toulouse. She went to the French court with Folquet de Marselha to plead for support, but she was nearby when her husband was killed as he besieged Toulouse. After this she returned to her family's estates near Paris.

== Issue ==
Alix and Simon had among others:

- Amaury de Montfort,
- Simon, eventually gained possession of the earldom of Leicester and played a major role in the reign of Henry III of England, initiating the Second Barons' War of 1263–1264.
- Guy de Montfort, Count of Bigorre, was married to Petronille, Countess of Bigorre, on 6 November 1216, but died at the siege of Castelnaudary on 20 July 1220.
- Amicie de Montfort, founded the nunnery at Montargis and died there in 1253.
- Petronilla, became an abbess at the Cistercian nunnery of St. Antoine's.

== Sources ==
- Baldwin, John W. (2019). Knights, Lords, and Ladies: In Search of Aristocrats in the Paris Region, 1180-1220. University of Pennsylvania Press.
- Maddicott, John Robert (1994). Simon de Montfort. Cambridge: Cambridge University Press.
- Jonathan Sumption, The Albigensian Crusade, 2000

== See also ==
- Simon IV de Montfort
