= Guillaume de Montfort of Hainaut =

French nobleman (before 990–before 1053)

Guillaume de Montfort
- Seigneur of Montfort
- Predecessor: New title
- Successor: Amaury I de Montfort
- Born: before 990
- Died: before 1053
- Noble family: House of Montfort
- Spouse: Albreda de Nogent
- Issue: Amaury I de Montfort
- Father: Amaury, Count of Valenciennes (possibly)

Guillaume de Montfort (before 990 – before 1053) also known as Guillaume of Hainaut, was a French nobleman of the end of the 10th century, the first Lord of Montfort-l'Amaury.

He was succeeded as Lord of Montfort-l'Amaury by his son Amaury I de Montfort.

Guillaume is possibly the son of Amaury, Count of Valenciennes.

== Bibliography ==
- Hadrot, Marie-Huguette (2002). Montfort l'Amaury: de l'an mil à nos jours (in French). Paris: Somogy. p. 191. ISBN 2-85056-563-6.
- Dion, Adolphe de (1895). Le comte palatin Hugues de Beauvais. Memoirs of the Archaeological Society of Rambouillet. Tours.
