= Amice, Countess of Rochefort =

Countess of Rochefort and suo jure countess of Leicester (died 1215)

Amicia de Beaumont
- Other names: Amice
- Died: 1215
- Noble family: Beaumont
- Spouse: Simon de Montfort
- Issue: Simon de Montfort, 5th Earl of Leicester; Guy de Montfort, Lord of Sidon; Petronilla de Montfort
- Father: Robert de Beaumont, 3rd Earl of Leicester
- Mother: Petronilla de Grandmesnil

Amice (died 1215) was a Countess of Rochefort and suo jure countess of Leicester. She is associated with England but is thought to have spent most of her life in France.

She was the daughter of Robert de Beaumont, 3rd Earl of Leicester and Petronilla de Grandmesnil.

== Life ==
Amice is remembered as the Countess of Leicester. Her brother was Robert, 4th Earl of Leicester; when he died, under the French rules of inheritance, his lands were divided between his two sisters. Amice was the elder and received the city and title of Leicester whilst Margaret inherited Winchester.

Amice had married Simon de Montfort at some time and that marriage ended when she became a widow in 1188/1189. Their children included:

- Simon de Montfort, 5th Earl of Leicester
- Guy de Montfort, Lord of Sidon
- Petronilla (Pernel) de Montfort, who became the wife of Barthélemy de Roye

Amice then married William des Barres.

Amice died in 1215 on 3 September and was buried at Priory of Haute-Bruyère where other de Montforts were buried. Amice and her descendants never exploited their ownership of Leicester because of hostilities between England and France. However the family continued their claim and it was proven by the 6th Earl, Simon de Montfort.
