= Amaury I of Montfort =

French nobleman (died c.1053)

Amaury I de Montfort
- Seigneur of Montfort
- Predecessor: Guillaume de Montfort
- Successor: Simon I de Montfort
- Died: c. 1053
- Noble family: House of Montfort
- Spouse: Bertrade
- Issue: Simon I de Montfort; Mainier de Montfort; Eva
- Father: Guillaume de Montfort
- Occupation: lord

Amaury I de Montfort (died c. 1053) was Lord of Montfort, son of Guillaume de Montfort of Hainaut, the first Lord of Montfort. The castle of Montfort l'Amaury, of which he started the construction, was completed by his son Simon I de Montfort, who succeeded him as Lord of Montfort. He married Bertrade.

He and his wife had three children:

- Simon I de Montfort (died 25 September 1087)
- Mainier de Montfort, Seigneur d'Épernon (died before 1091)
- Eva (died 23 Jan 1099), married William Crispin (died 8 January 1074), son of Gilbert I Crispin
