= Robert de Beaumont, 3rd Earl of Leicester =

English nobleman (1104–1168)

- The coat of arms of Robert de Beaumont that are the current colour and symbol of Leicester

Earl of Leicester
- Monarchs: Henry II and Richard I

Personal details
- Born: 1121 Leicester, Leicestershire, England
- Died: 1190 (aged 68–69) Dyrrachium, Albania
- Spouse: Petronilla de Grandmesnil, Countess of Leicester
- Children: Robert, 4th Earl of Leicester; Roger; William; Amice
- Parents: Amice de Gael (mother); Robert de Beaumont, 2nd Earl of Leicester (father)

Robert de Beaumont, 3rd Earl of Leicester (1121 – 1190), called Blanchemains, was an English nobleman, one of the principal followers of Henry the Young King in the Revolt of 1173–1174 against his father King Henry II.

== Life ==
Robert was the son of Amice de Gael and husband Robert de Beaumont, 2nd Earl of Leicester, a staunch supporter of Henry II, and he inherited from his father large estates in England and Normandy.

When the younger Henry revolted in April 1173, Robert went to his castle at Breteuil in Normandy. The rebels' aim was to take control of the duchy, but Henry II himself led an army to besiege the castle; Robert fled, and the Breteuil was taken on 25 or 26 September.

Robert went to Flanders, where he raised a large force of mercenaries, and landed at Walton, Suffolk, on 29 September 1173. He joined forces with Hugh Bigod, 1st Earl of Norfolk, and the two marched west, aiming to cut England in two across the Midlands and to relieve the king's siege of Robert's castle at Leicester. However, they were intercepted by the king's supporters and defeated at the Battle of Fornham near Fornham, near Bury St Edmunds, on 17 October. Robert, along with his wife and many others, were taken prisoner. Henry II took away the earl's lands and titles as well.

Robert remained in captivity until January 1177, well after most of the other prisoners had been released. The king was in a strong position and could afford to be merciful; not long after his release Robert's lands and titles were restored, but not his castles. All but two of his castles had been destroyed (slighted), and those two (Montsorrel in Leicestershire and Pacy in Normandy) remained in the king's hands.

Robert had little influence in the remaining years of Henry II's reign, but was restored to favour by King Richard I of England. He carried one of the swords of state at Richard's coronation in 1189. In 1190 Robert went on the Third Crusade to the Holy Land but he died at Dyrrachium in Albania on his return journey. (Note: Stephen Bennett states Robert 3rd Earl of Leicester died on crusade but does not state where.)

== Family ==
Robert married Petronilla, who was a daughter of William de Grandmesnil and great-granddaughter and eventual heiress to the English lands of Domesday baron, Hugh de Grandmesnil. They had:

- Robert, who succeeded his father as Earl of Leicester;
- Roger, who became Bishop of St Andrews in 1189;
- William I De Beaumont Born 1148.,
- Amice, who married Simon de Montfort, and whose son Simon subsequently became Earl of Leicester;
- Margaret, who married Saer de Quincy, later 1st Earl of Winchester

== Sources ==
- Bennett, Stephen (2021). Elite Participation in the Third Crusade. Vol. 50. The Boydell Press.
- Hays, L.; Jones, E. D. (1990). "Policy on the Run: Henry II and Irish Sea Diplomacy". Journal of British Studies. 29 (4 (Oct.)). Cambridge University Press: 293–316.
- Hollister, C. Warren (2001). Henry I. Yale University Press.
- Jones, Robert W. (2023). A Cultural History of the Medieval Sword: Power, Piety and Play. The Boydell Press.
- Lemoine-Descourtieux, Astrid (2011). La Frontière normande de l'Avre: De la fondation de la Normandie à sa reunion au domaine royal (in French). Publication des Universites de Rouen et du Havre.
- Young, Francis (2018). Edmund: In Search of England's Lost King. I.B. Tauris.
- Paul, James Balfour, Sir, Scots Peerage IX vols. Edinburgh 1907.
- Cowan, Samuel, The Lord Chancellors of Scotland Edinburgh 1911.

Political offices
Preceded by Robert de Beaumont, 2nd Earl of Leicester	Lord High Steward; 1168–1190	Succeeded by Robert de Beaumont, 4th Earl of Leicester
Peerage of England
Preceded by Robert de Beaumont	Earl of Leicester; 1168–1190	Succeeded by Robert de Beaumont
