= Jean de Montfort =

Jean de Montfort or John of Montfort may refer to:

- John I of Montfort (died 1249), count of Montfort
- Jean de Montfort (died 1283), lord of Tyre and of Toron
- Jean de Montfort-Castres (died 1300), count of Squillace (kingdom of Naples)
- John of Montfort (astronomer) (fl. 1329–1332)
- John II of Montfort (1294–1345), count of Montfort, contested Duke of Brittany
- John IV, Duke of Brittany (1339–1399), son of the former, Duke of Brittany from 1364 to 1399, count of Richemont and count of Montfort (1345–1399)
- Jean de Montfort (1385–1414), who later took the name Guy XIII de Laval, Lord of Laval
