= Guillaume de Montfort (bishop of Paris) =

Bishop of Paris from 1095 to 1101

- Paris
- Church: Roman Catholic
- Archdiocese: Paris
- Province: Ile de France
- Metropolis: Paris
- Diocese: Paris
- Installed: May 1095
- Term ended: 1101
- Predecessor: Godfrey of Boulogne
- Successor: Foulques of Paris

Orders
- Ordination: September 1096

Personal details
- Born: Guillaume de Montfort; Before 1087 Yves
- Died: 27 August 1101 Paris
- Denomination: Roman Catholic
- Parents: Simon I de Montfort; Isabelle de Broyes
- Occupation: Bishop

Guillaume de Montfort (English: William of Montfort) (died 27 August 1101) was a French bishop, most notably the Bishop of Paris from 1095 to 1101.

== Early life ==
Montfort was the son of Simon I de Montfort. His date of birth is not known. He became a clerk to Saint Ivo of Chartres, the Bishop of Chartres.

== Election ==
In 1095, Pope Urban II held the Council of Clermont at Clermont-Ferrand, France. It excommunicated Philip I of France and Bertrade de Montfort, William's sister, for adultery. William had been noted as a great supporter of Urban II, and after the death of Geoffrey of Boulogne on 1 May 1095 he was in the running to become Bishop of Paris.

As the queen's brother, he held considerable power and sway over the council that elected him - he was also known for his religious devotion. However, he was young and a fairly minor member of the French church.

Urban II considered Montfort a viable choice for the bishopric, however due to his relations to the excommunicated Philip I he was not chosen. However, in July 1096 Philip's excommunication was lifted and the Pope allowed him to become bishop.

== Death ==
He fought in the First Crusade, but was killed there in battle on 27 August 1101.
