= Simon II of Montfort =

Simon II de Montfort
- Seigneur of Montfort
- Reign: 1092-1104
- Predecessor: Richard de Montfort
- Successor: Amaury III of Montfort
- Born: c. 1068
- Died: 25 September 1104
- Noble family: House of Montfort
- Father: Simon I de Montfort
- Mother: Agnès d'Évreux

Simon II de Montfort (c. 1068 – 25 September 1104) was a French nobleman who was the Seigneur of Montfort from 1092 to 1104.

== Biography ==
He was born in Montfort l'Amaury, Île-de-France, the son of Simon I de Montfort (c. 1025–1087) and Agnès d'Évreux (c. 1030–c. 1087).

He succeeded his brother Richard de Montfort in 1092 as lord of Montfort-l'Amaury. In 1098, he had to sustain a siege led by William II Rufus, King of England and guardian of Normandy in the absence of Robert Curthose, gone to crusade, and Simon successfully fought it off.

He died without an heir and left Montfort to his brother, Amaury III.

Preceded by Richard	Seigneur of Montfort; 1092-c.1104	Succeeded by Amaury III
