= Richard of Évreux =

Norman nobleman (1015–1067)

Richard d'Evreux

Count of Évreux
- Reign: 1037–1067
- Predecessor: Robert
- Successor: William
- Born: c. 1015
- Died: c. 1067
- Buried: Fontenelle Abbey, Monastery of Saint-Wandrille
- Noble family: House of Normandy
- Spouse: Godechildis
- Issue: William, Count of Évreux; Godehildis d'Evreux; Agnes d'Evreux
- Father: Robert II, Archbishop of Rouen, Count of Évreux
- Mother: Harleve of Rouen

Richard, Count of Évreux (c. 1015 – c. 1067) was a powerful Norman nobleman during the reign of William Duke of Normandy.

== Life ==
Richard was the eldest son of Robert II Archbishop of Rouen and Count of Évreux and Herleva. Richard donated a mill at Evreux to the abbey of Jumièges by charter dated [26 Mar 1038/14 Apr 1039]. In a charter of King William I, Richard is confirmed as having been a benefactor to that abbey. Richard and his wife, Godechildis, founded Saint-Sauveur d´Evreux. As Count of Evreux, he donated the church of Gravigny to Sainte-Trinité de Rouen, dated [1052/66]. Richard donated the tithe of a town to the abbey of Saint-Taurin.

Some report him as taking part in the battle of Hastings on 14 Oct 1066, but it is unlikely due to his advanced age and death the next year. His son, William, was one of the few known companions of William the Conqueror at the Battle of Hastings in 1066. William contributed 80 ships to the invasion of England in 1066, appearing as Count of Évreux. Richard died in 1067.

== Family ==
Richard married, after 1040, Godehildis (or Adelaide), the widow of Roger I of Tosny. (Note: de Jumièges records the marriage of the widow of "Roger du Ternois" and "Richard comte d'Evreux et fils de Robert l'archevêque". The Miracles of Sainte-Foy recount her being cured of a serious illness by miracle, when she was still married to her first husband. Henry I King of England confirmed the foundation of Conches by "Rogerius senior de Toenio et filius eius Radulphus senex et Radulphus juvenis filius prædicti Radulphi senis et Rogerius filius Radulphi juvenis", quoting the donation by "Godehildis comitissa Ebroicæ civitatis, quondam uxor Rogerii de Totteneio" with the consent of "seniore meo comite Richardo", dated to [1130][1878]. "Richardus, archipræsulis Roberti filius…et uxor mea Godehyldis" founded Saint-Sauveur d´Evreux, in which "Godehylde filia mea" became a nun, by undated charter[1879].)

Richard and Godehildis had the following issue:

- William d'Evreux († 1118), succeeded his father as Count of Évreux.
- Godehildis d'Evreux, nun at St. Sauveur, Évreux.
- Agnes d'Evreux, married Simon I de Montfort, mother of Bertrade of Montfort.

== Sources ==
- Bates, David (1982). Normandy before 1066. Longman.
- van Houts, Elisabeth (1988). "The Ship List of William the Conqueror". In Brown, R. Allen (ed.). Anglo-Norman Studies X; Proceedings of the Battle Conference 1987. The Boydell Press.
- van Houts, Elisabeth, ed. (2000). The Normans in Europe. Manchester University Press.
- Potts, Cassandra (1997). Monastic revival and regional identity in early Normandy. The Boydell Press.
- Power, Daniel (2004). The Norman Frontier in the Twelfth and Early Thirteenth Centuries. Cambridge University Press.
- Searle, Eleanor (1988). Predatory Kinship and the Creation of Norman Power, 840-1066. University of California Press.
- Tabuteau, Emily Zack (1988). Transfers of Property in Eleventh-century Norman Law. University of North Carolina Press.

Preceded by Robert II	Count of Évreux; 1037–1067	Succeeded by William
