= Isabel of Conches =

French Norman noblewoman (c. 1057 – 1102)

Isabel de Conches
- Born: c. 1057; Montfort sur Risle, Eure, Normandy
- Died: 1102; Saint-Rémy-l'Honoré, Yvelines, Île-de-France
- Noble family: House of Montfort
- Father: Simon I de Montfort

Isabel of Conches, (c. 1057 – 1102) wife of Ralph of Tosny, rode armed like a knight during a conflict in northern France during the late 11th century.

== Early life ==
Isabel was the daughter of Simon I de Montfort. and was born in Montfort-sur-Risle, Eure, Normandy, in 1057.

== Marriage and issue ==
Isabel married Raoul II of Tosny, they had:

- Roger, died young
- Raoul IV de Conches, married Alice of Huntingdon, daughter of Waltheof, Earl of Northumbria, and Judith of Lens
- Godehilde married Baldwin I of Jerusalem

== Legend ==
The chronicler Orderic Vitalis in his Ecclesiastical History describes Isabel in some detail.

Orderic describes Isabel as "joyful, generous, daring and well loved by all". He describes her in the hall of Conches, listening to knights talk about their dreams. Isabel unfortunately, also had a conflicted relationship with her sister-in-law, Helewise of Évreux. The disagreement reached a point that her husband took up arms against William, Count of Évreux. Both families came to open war in 1091–1092, when William attacked Conches.

During the ensuing conflict, Isabel is said to have worn armour and joined her knights on the battlefield. Orderic describes her in the following manner:

In war she rode armed as a knight among the knights; and she showed no less courage among the knights in hauberks and sergeants-at-arms than did the maid Camilla, the pride of Italy, among the troops of Turnus. She deserved comparison with Lampeto and Marpesia, Hippolyta and Penthesilea and the other warlike Amazon queens.

Orderic gives no further description of her role in the battle. Isabel may have encouraged the knights, or perhaps fought actively, as the comparisons to these warlike heroines seem to suggest.

A settlement was finally reached between the warring families.

== Later life and death ==
According to the chronicle, Isabel ended up in a nunnery where she "worthily reformed her life". Isabel died on 24 April 1102, in Saint-Rémy-l'Honoré, Yvelines, Île-de-France, France, at the age of 44, and was buried in Rambouillet, Seine-et-Oise, Île-de-France, France.
