= Bertrade of Montfort =

Queen of the Franks from 1092 to 1108

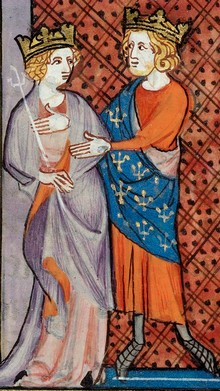
- Bertrade with Philip

Queen consort of the Franks
- Tenure: 15 May 1092 – 29 July 1108
- Born: c. 1070
- Died: 14 February 1117 (aged about 47)
- Spouse: Fulk IV, Count of Anjou; Philip I, King of France
- Issue: Fulk, King of Jerusalem; Philip, Count of Mantes; Fleury, Seigneur of Nangis; Cecile, Princess of Galilee
- House: House of Montfort
- Father: Simon I of Montfort
- Mother: Agnes of Évreux

Bertrade of Montfort (c. 1070 – 14 February 1117), also known by other names, was a Norman noble from the House of Montfort. She was countess of Anjou (1089–1092) through her first marriage to Fulk the Rude and then queen consort of France (1092–1108) through her initially bigamous marriage to Philip I. Condemned in her era's ecclesiastical histories, she played a role in the popularization of pigache footwear and founded a daughter house of Fontevraud Abbey at Hautes-Bruyeres.

== Names ==
Bertrade is a French feminine given name related to Bertha, descended from Proto-Germanic roots reconstructed as *berht ("bright") and *rād ("counsel, advice"). Notably, it was held by Bertrade of Laon, mother of Charlemagne. The Norman countess and queen's name also appears as Bertrada of Montfort (Latin: Bertrada de Monteforti) and as Bertrade de Montfort from the French form of her family's name.

== Life ==
Bertrade was born around 1070 to Simon I, lord of Montfort, and Agnes of Évreux, daughter of Richard, Count of Évreux and Godehildis. Her brother was Amaury III.

As a teenager, Bertrade was the ward of her maternal uncle William of Évreux. In 1089, the much-married Count Fulk IV of Anjou demanded her hand from Duke Robert Curthose of Normandy in exchange for his assistance putting down rebel Manceaux. Despite his reservations about the duke and about Fulk's numerous ex-wives, William consented to the marriage in exchange for the restoration of lands previously held by his relative Ralph the Asshead. According to the scandalized English historian Orderic Vitalis, Fulk's embarrassment concerning his bunions prompted him to develop the pigache, a pointed-toe shoe that quickly became fashionable across Western Europe despite repeated condemnations by the church. Shortly after their 1089 marriage, Bertrade bore Fulk's son and heir, Fulk V.

In early 1092, Bertrade either abandoned Fulk or was abducted—accounts vary—and began living with Philip I, king of France. Although she might not have yet been formally divorced from Fulk, she married Philip on 15 May 1092 and became his queen consort. She seems to have quickly reconciled Fulk with the situation and Philip remained with her despite threats of excommunication by the church. Finally excommunicated by Pope Urban II in 1095, Philip was forbidden from joining the First Crusade, which established the Kingdom of Jerusalem that her first son Fulk eventually ruled.

In Orderic Vitalis's Ecclesiastical History of the era, he claims Bertrade was anxious that one of her sons succeed Philip, claiming she sought to kill his first son Louis through sorcery and poison and even wrote to Henry I, king of England, asking him to arrest her stepson. Upon Philip's death in 1108, Louis did succeed him and Bertrade became a nun at Fontevraud Abbey. She founded a daughter house at Hautes-Bruyeres before 1112 and moved there as its abbess before her death on 14 February 1117.

== Issue ==
Bertrade and Fulk IV of Anjou had one son, Fulk, who became count of Anjou and king of Jerusalem (c. 1090–1143).

Bertrade and King Philip I of France had:

- Philip, count of Mantes (living in 1123)
- Fleury, seigneur of Nangis (living in 1118)
- Cecile (died 1145), who married Prince Tancred of Galilee and then Count Pons of Tripoli

French royalty
Preceded by Bertha of Holland	Queen consort of the Franks; 1092–1108	Succeeded by Adelaide of Maurienne
