= Amaury IV de Montfort =

French noble

Amaury IV de Montfort (d.1140) was Count of Évreux as Amaury II from 1137 to 1140.

He was the son of Amaury III de Montfort, lord of Montfort l'Amaury and count of Évreux, and Agnes of Garlande.

The Montforts were the vassals of the king of France for Montfort and also vassals to the king of England (in their capacity as Dukes of Normandy) for Évreux. Due to this, the Montforts were caught between the rivalry of the two kingdoms. Amaury III had attempted to solve this problem by leaving Évreux to his elder son Amaury IV and Montfort to his younger son Simon III.

Amaury IV accordingly succeeded his father as Count of Évreux, but survived him by only three years, dying unmarried and without children. He was succeeded his brother, Simon III, reuniting the Montfort titles.

== Bibliography ==
- Bauduin, Pierre (2004). La Première Normandie (xe-xie siècles). Caen, France: Presses Universitaires de Caen. ISBN 2841331458.

Preceded by Amaury III	Count of Évreux; 1137–1140	Succeeded by Simon III
