= Guy de Montfort, Count of Bigorre =

Guy de Montfort (died 1220) was the Count of Bigorre from 6 November 1216 to 1220 in right of his wife, Petronilla. He was a son of Simon de Montfort, 5th Earl of Leicester and Alice of Montmorency.

Guy joined his father on the Albigensian Crusade while still quite young. Late in 1216, he married Petronilla, the heiress to Bigorre and the Viscounty of Marsan through her mother Stephanie, and a daughter of Bernard IV of Comminges.

He fought at his father's side at the siege of Toulouse in 1218, but his father died: crushed by the projectile of a siege engine. Guy's oldest brother Amaury de Montfort inherited their father's command, but not his strategic vision. The Occitan lords rebelled against him and Guy was killed in a conflict at Castelnaudary in 1220, either on 4 April or in July.

Guy left a daughter, Alice, who succeeded Petronilla as Countess of Bigorre. He also left a daughter named Pernelle, who married Raoul de la Roche-Tesson.
