= Simon III of Montfort =

Nobleman (1117–1181)

Simon III de Montfort
- Count of Évreux
- Born: 1117
- Died: 13 March 1181 (aged 63–64)
- Noble family: Montfort
- Spouse: Matilda
- Issue: Amaury V Simon; Bertrade
- Father: Amaury III de Montfort
- Mother: Agnès de Garlande

Simon III de Montfort (1117 – 13 March 1181), nicknamed the Bald (le chauve), was count of Évreux from 1140 until 1181 and the Seigneur of Montfort from 1137 to 1181. He was the son of Amaury III and Agnès de Garlande, daughter of Anseau de Garlande.

== Life ==
The Montforts were the vassals of the king of France for Montfort and also vassals to the king of England (in their capacity as Dukes of Normandy) for Évreux. Due to this, the Montforts were caught between the rivalry of the two kingdoms. Amaury III had attempted to solve this problem by leaving Évreux to his eldest son Amaury IV and Montfort to his youngest son Simon III. However, Amaury IV died three years after his father, which resulted in the reunification of the two domains.

Simon III chose to side with the English king and gave him the strongholds of Montfort, Rochefort and Epernon. Because of this, Louis VII, King of France, "could not come and go freely from Paris to Orleans or to Etampes because the Normans had been established by King Henry in the castles of the counts of Evreux".

Later, Simon III was reconciled with Louis VII, who gave him custody of the Castle of Saint-Léger-en-Yvelines.

== Marriage and Children ==
Simon married Matilda, and had:

- Amaury III († c. 1190), count of Évreux
- Simon († 1188), lord of Montfort
- Bertrade, married to Hugh de Kevelioc, 5th Earl of Chester

== Bibliography ==
- Hadrot, Marie-Huguette (2002). Montfort l'Amaury: de l'an mil à nos jours. Paris, France: SOMOGY (ADL). ISBN 2850565636.
- Bauduin, Pierre (2004). La Première Normandie (xe-xie siècles). Caen, France: Presses Universitaires de Caen. ISBN 2841331458.

| Preceded by Amaury III | Seigneur of Montfort; 1137-1181 | Succeeded by Simon |
| Preceded by Amaury IV | Count of Évreux; 1140–1181 | Succeeded by Amaury V |
