= Amaury de Montfort (died 1241) =

Lord of Montfort-l'Amaury

- Seigneur of Montfort
- Born: 1192; Montfort-l'Amaury, Kingdom of France
- Died: late 1241; Otranto, Kingdom of Sicily
- Buried: St. Peter's Basilica (body), Priory of Haute-Bruyère (heart)
- Noble family: House of Montfort
- Spouse: Beatrix of Viennois
- Issue: John I of Montfort; Marguerite of Montfort; Laure of Montfort; Adela of Montfort; Pernelle of Montfort
- Father: Simon de Montfort, 5th Earl of Leicester
- Mother: Alix de Montmorency

Amaury de Montfort, Lord of Montfort-l'Amaury, (1192 – 1241) was the son of Simon de Montfort, 5th Earl of Leicester and Alix de Montmorency, and the older brother of Simon de Montfort, 6th Earl of Leicester. Amaury inherited his father's French properties while his brother Simon inherited the English title of Earl of Leicester.

== Biography ==
=== The Albigensian Crusade ===
His father departed on the Albigensian Crusade in 1209. It is unknown when Amaury joined him in the south, but he could possibly arrive in spring 1210, when his mother came there bringing reinforcements for his father. He was knighted on 24 June 1213 in Castelnaudary in the course of a particularly solemn ceremony and continued to fight under his father's command until his death at Toulouse on 25 June 1218. As his father's successor, he inherited the County of Toulouse (that his father had taken from Raymond VI of Toulouse as a reward for his role in the Crusade) and other titles and lands in Languedoc.

In 1224, he ceded his titles and lands in Languedoc to King Louis VIII. In exchange, Montfort-l'Amaury was elevated to a county, and several years later, in 1230, Amaury succeeded his uncle Mathieu II of Montmorency as Constable of France.

=== County of Leicester ===
His father inherited the county of Leicester from his mother, Amicie de Beaumont, daughter of Robert III de Beaumont. After his death, Amaury became Earl of Leicester, but, as a liegeman of the French king, he could not be a vassal of the King of England at the same time. By 1230, Amaury and Simon, his only surviving brother, decided to split their father's inheritance: Amaury would retain Montfort-l'Amaury in France, and Simon would receive Leicester in England. However, the affair lasted for almost a decade: only on 11 April 1239 Amaury officially renounced his rights in England, and King Henry III recognised Simon as Earl of Leicester.

=== The Barons' Crusade ===
In 1239 he departed for the Holy Land in the Barons' Crusade with Theobald I of Navarre, Hugh IV, Duke of Burgundy and many other prominent nobles of the realm. King Louis IX did not go on crusade, but gave the expedition a royal character by permitting Amaury to carry the Fleur-de-lys. On 13 November 1239, he was taken prisoner during a disastrous battle under Henry of Bar at Gaza, during which Henry was killed, and led to Egypt with six hundred other prisoners. He spent the next 18 months in the dungeons of Cairo where he was treated more severely than the other prisoners because he would not tell the sultan who were the other prisoners. He was freed on 23 April 1241, along with other French prisoners, after the crusaders under Richard of Cornwall and the sultan of Egypt concluded an alliance against the sultan of Damascus. He died in Otranto later the same year on his way home and was buried, at the Pope's order, in St. Peter's Basilica; his heart, according to his own wish at his death, was brought to the Abbey of Haute-Bruyère near Montfort-l'Amaury where Aubry Le Cornu, bishop of Chartres, enclosed it in an effigy.

== Marriage and issue ==
Amaury was married to Beatrix, daughter of Guigues VI of Viennois, and was the father of:

- Jean (John) I (d. 1249), married to Jeanne (Johanna), Lady of Châteaudun
- Marguerite (Margaret) (d. 1289 or 1290), married to John III, Count of Soissons
- Laure (Laura) (d. 1270), married to Fernando (Ferdinand) II, Count of Aumale (1239–1260)
- Adela (or Alix) (1230 – 28 March 1279), married to Simon of Nesle (1220–1288)
- Pernelle (d. 5 December 1275), abbess of Port-Royal-des-Champs

== Gallery ==
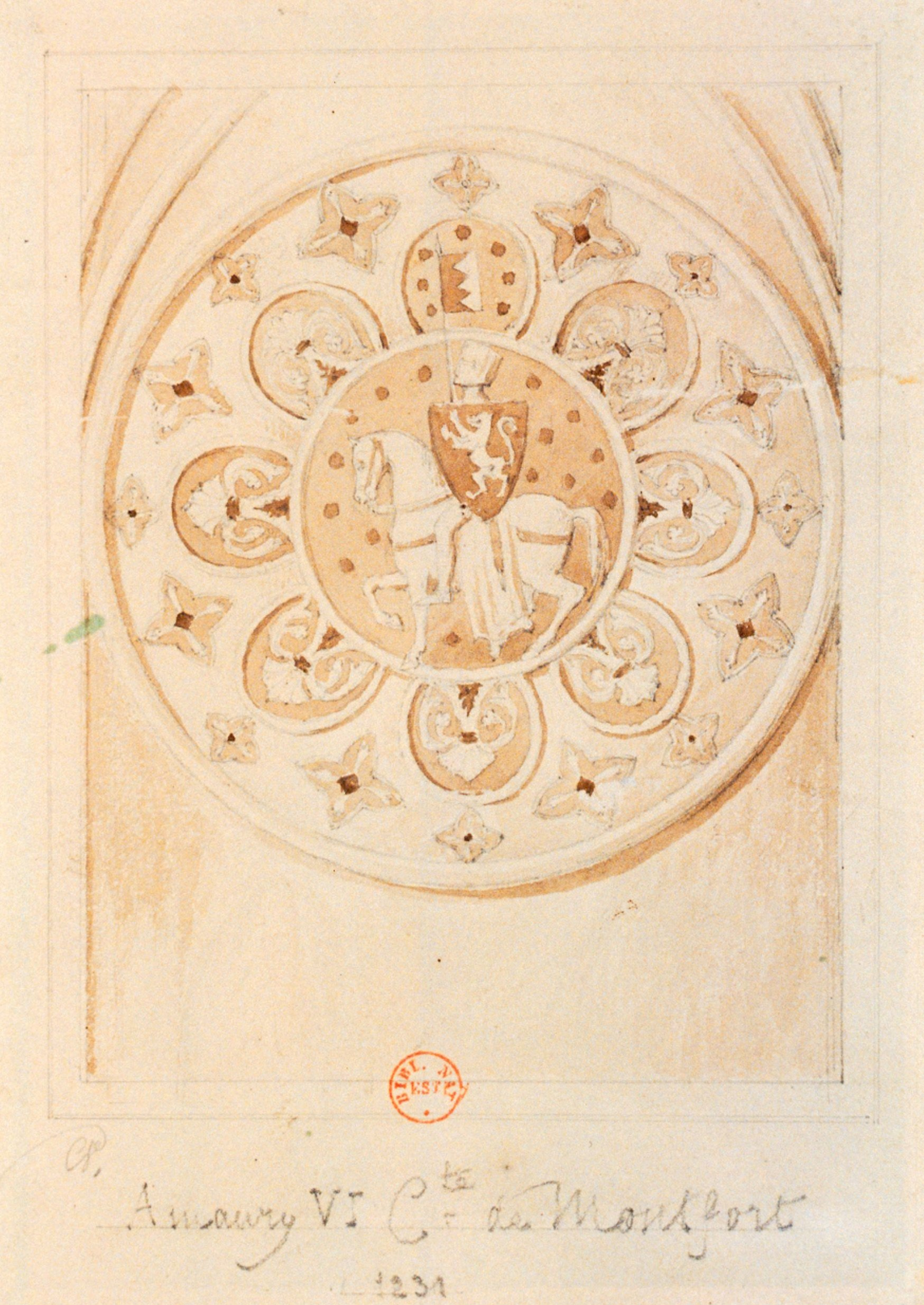
Amaury as he appeared in a window of Chartres Cathedral

== Sources ==
- Lippiatt, G.E.M. (2017). Simon V of Montfort and Baronial Government, 1195-1218. Oxford University Press.
- Maddicott, J. R. (1995). Simon de Montfort. Cambridge University Press.
- Newman, William Mendel (1971). Les seigneurs de Nesle en Picardie (XIIe-XIIIe siècle): Recueil des Chartes (in French). Edition A. & J. Picard.
