= Simon de Montfort, 5th Earl of Leicester =

French nobleman and leader of the Albigensian Crusade (c. 1175–1218)

Simon de Montfort
- 5th Earl of Leicester
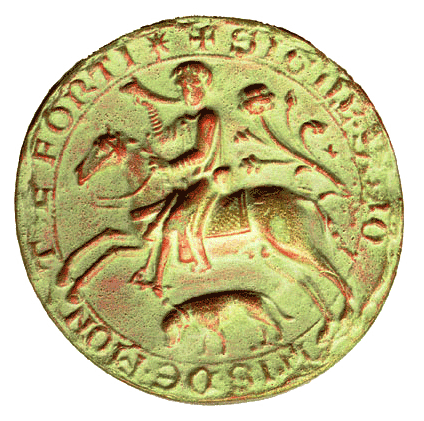
- Seal of Simon de Montfort, depicting him riding a horse and blowing a hunting horn with a hound alongside, inscribed with his Latinised name: SIGILL[UM] SIMONIS DE MONTE FORTI ("seal of Simon de Montfort")
- Born: c. 1175
- Died: 25 June 1218 (aged 42–43); Siege of Toulouse
- Buried: Cathedral of Saint-Nazaire, Carcassonne, later moved to Montfort l'Amaury
- Noble family: Montfort
- Spouse: Alix de Montmorency
- Issue: Amaury de Montfort; Simon de Montfort, 6th Earl of Leicester; Guy de Montfort, Count of Bigorre; Amicie de Montfort; Petronilla
- Father: Simon de Montfort
- Mother: Amicia de Beaumont

Simon de Montfort, 5th Earl of Leicester (c. 1175 – 25 June 1218), known as Simon IV (or V (Note: The discrepancy in numbering arises from confusion between Simon III de Montfort (died 1181) and his son Simon de Montfort (died 1188). The latter was historically unknown, and Simon III was believed to be the father (not the grandfather) of the subject of this article, who is therefore known as Simon IV in some sources and Simon V in others.)) de Montfort and as Simon de Montfort the Elder, was a French nobleman and knight of the early 13th century. He is widely regarded as one of the great military commanders of the Middle Ages. He took part in the Fourth Crusade and was one of the prominent figures of the Albigensian Crusade. Montfort is mostly noted for his campaigns in the latter, notably for his battle at Muret. He died at the Siege of Toulouse in 1218. He was Lord of Montfort from 1188 to his death and Earl of Leicester in England from 1204. He was also Viscount of Albi, Béziers and Carcassonne from 1213, as well as Count of Toulouse from 1215.

== Early life ==
He was the son of Simon de Montfort (d. 1188), lord of Montfort l'Amaury in France near Paris, and Amicia de Beaumont, daughter of Robert de Beaumont, 3rd Earl of Leicester. He succeeded his father as lord of Montfort in 1188; in 1190 he married Alix de Montmorency, the daughter of Bouchard III de Montmorency. She shared his religious zeal and would accompany him on his campaigns.

In 1199, while taking part in a tournament at Ecry-sur-Aisne, he took the cross in the company of Count Thibaud de Champagne and went on the Fourth Crusade. The crusade soon fell under Venetian control, and was diverted to Zara on the Adriatic Sea. Pope Innocent III had specifically warned the Crusaders not to attack fellow Christians; Simon opposed the attack and urged a waiting Zara delegation not to surrender, claiming the Frankish troops would not support the Venetians in this. As a result, the delegation returned to Zara and the city resisted. Since most Frankish lords were in debt to the Venetians, they did support the attack and the city was sacked in 1202. Simon did not participate in this action and was one of its most outspoken critics. He and his associates, including Abbot Guy of Vaux-de-Cernay, left the crusade when the decision was taken to divert once more to Constantinople to place Alexius IV Angelus on the throne. Instead, Simon and his followers travelled to the court of King Emeric of Hungary and thence to Acre.

His mother was the eldest daughter of Robert of Beaumont, 3rd Earl of Leicester. After the death of her brother Robert de Beaumont, 4th Earl of Leicester, without children in 1204, she inherited half of his estates and a claim to the Earldom of Leicester. The division of the estates was effected early in 1207, by which the rights to the earldom were assigned to Amicia and Simon. However, King John of England took possession of the lands himself in February 1207, and confiscated its revenues. Later, in 1215, the lands were passed into the hands of Simon's cousin, Ranulph de Meschines, 4th Earl of Chester.

== Later life ==
Simon remained on his estates in France before taking the cross once more, this time against suspected Christian dissidence. He participated in the initial campaign of the Albigensian Crusade in 1209, and after the Siege of Carcassonne, was elected leader of the crusade and viscount of the confiscated territories of the Raymond-Roger Trencavel family.

Simon was rewarded with the territory conquered from Raymond VI of Toulouse, which in theory made him the most important landowner in Occitania. He became feared for his ruthlessness. In 1210 he burned 140 Cathars in the village of Minerve who refused to recant – though he spared those who did. In another widely reported incident, prior to the sack of the village of Lastours, he brought prisoners from the nearby village of Bram and had their eyes gouged out and their ears, noses and lips cut off. One prisoner, left with a single good eye, led them into the village as a warning.

Simon's part in the crusade had the backing of his feudal superior, the King of France, Philip Augustus. (Note: "Eight months later, Honorius granted Philip one-half of the twentieth from France to secure his help for Simon.") However, historian Alistair Horne, in his book Seven Ages of Paris, states that Philip "turned a blind eye to Simon de Montfort's crusade ... of which he disapproved, but readily accepted the spoils to his exchequer". Following the latter's success in winning Normandy from John Lackland of England, he was approached by Innocent III to lead the crusade but turned this down. He was heavily committed to defending his gains against John and against the emerging alliance among England, the Empire and Flanders.

However, Philip claimed full rights over the lands of the house of St Gilles; some historians believe his dispatch of de Montfort and other northern barons to be, at the very least, an exploratory campaign to reassert the rights of the French Crown in Le Midi. Philip may well also have wanted to appease the papacy after the long dispute over his marriage, which had led to excommunication. He also sought to counter any adventure by King John of England, who had marriage and fealty ties also with the Toulouse comtal house. Meanwhile, others have assessed Philip's motives to include removing over-mighty subjects from the North, and distracting them in adventure elsewhere, so they could not threaten his increasingly successful restoration of the power of the French crown in the north.

Simon is described as a man of unflinching religious orthodoxy, deeply committed to the Dominican order and the uprooting of heresy. Dominic Guzman, later Saint Dominic, spent several years during the war in the Midi at Fanjeau, which was Simon's headquarters, especially in the winter months when the crusading forces were depleted. Simon had other key confederates in this enterprise, which many historians view as a conquest of southern lands by greedy men from the north. Many of them had been involved in the Fourth Crusade. One was Guy Vaux de Cernay, head of a Cistercian abbey not more than twenty miles from Simon's patrimony of Montfort Aumary, who accompanied the crusade in the Languedoc and became bishop of Carcassonne. Meanwhile, Peter de Vaux de Cernay, the nephew of Guy, wrote an account of the crusade. Historians generally consider this to be propaganda to justify the actions of the crusaders; Peter justified their cruelties as doing "the work of God" against morally depraved heretics. He portrayed outrages committed by the lords of the Midi as the opposite.

Simon was an energetic campaigner, rapidly moving his forces to strike at those who had broken their faith with him – and there were many, as some local lords switched sides whenever the moment seemed propitious. The Midi was a warren of small fortified places, as well as home to some highly fortified cities, such as Toulouse, Carcassonne and Narbonne. Simon showed ruthlessness and daring as well as being particularly brutal with those who betrayed their pledges – as for example, Martin Algai, lord of Biron. In 1213 Simon defeated Peter II of Aragon at the Battle of Muret. This completed the defeat of the Albigensians, but Simon carried on the campaign as a war of conquest. He was appointed lord over all the newly acquired territory as Count of Toulouse and Duke of Narbonne (1215). He spent two years in warfare in many parts of Raymond's former territories; he besieged Beaucaire, which had been taken by Raymond VII of Toulouse, from 6 June 1216 to 24 August 1216.

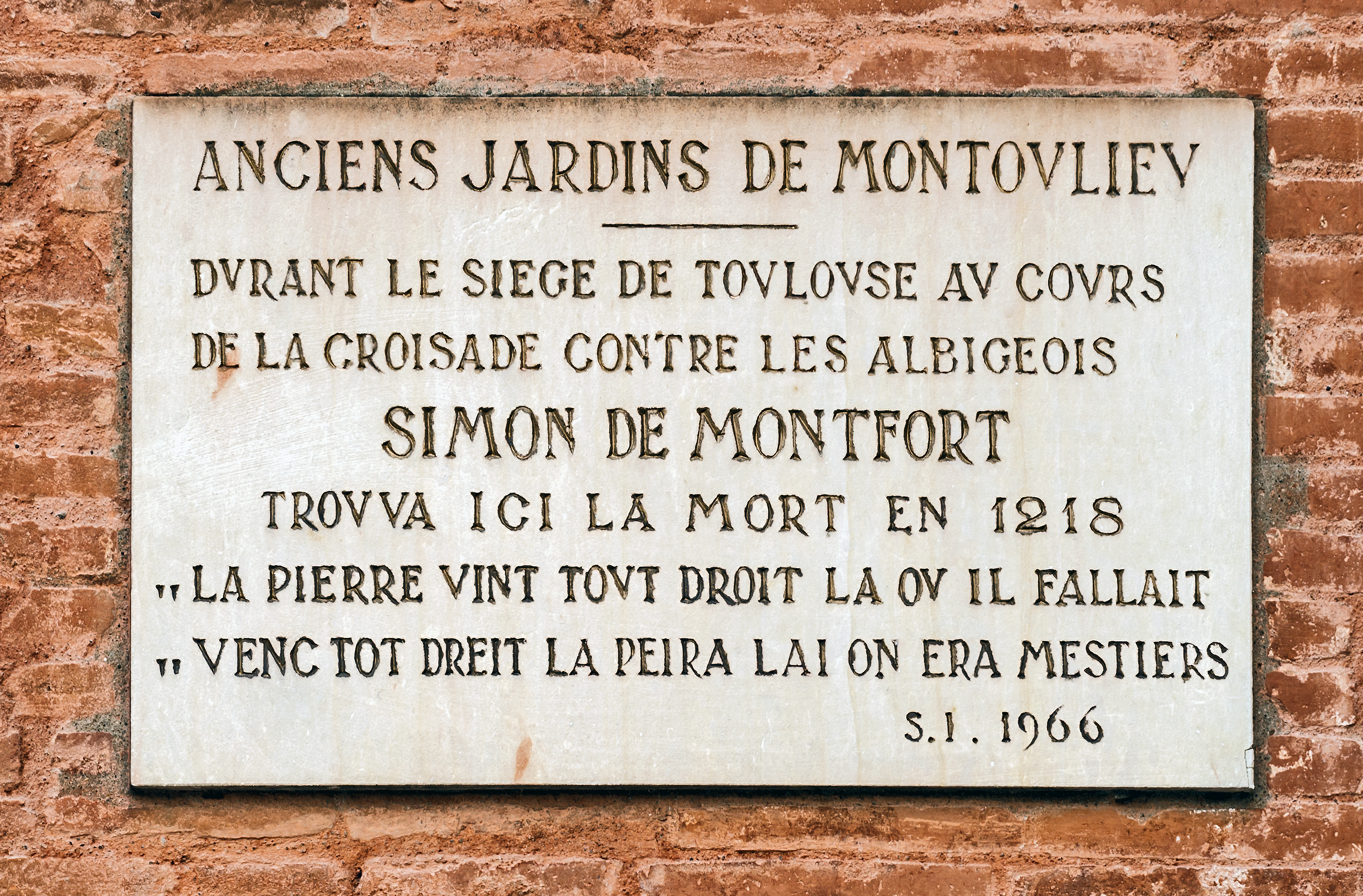
Plaque commemorating the death of Simon de Montfort

Raymond spent most of this period in the Crown of Aragon, but corresponded with sympathisers in Toulouse. There were rumours in September 1216 that he was on his way to Toulouse. Abandoning the siege of Beaucaire, Simon partially sacked Toulouse, perhaps intended as punishment of the citizens. Raymond returned in October 1217 to take possession of Toulouse. Simon hastened to besiege the city, meanwhile sending his wife, Alix de Montmorency, with bishop Foulques of Toulouse and others, to the French court to plead for support. After maintaining the siege for nine months, Simon was killed on 25 June 1218 while combating a sally by the besieged. His head was smashed by a stone from a mangonel, operated, according to one source, by the donas e tozas e mulhers ("ladies and girls and women") of Toulouse. He was buried in the Cathedral of Saint-Nazaire at Carcassonne. His body was later moved by one of his sons to be reinterred at Montfort l'Amaury. A tombstone in the south transept of the cathedral is inscribed "of Simon de Montfort".

== Children ==
Simon and Alix had:

- Amaury de Montfort married Beatrix of Viennois, died in 1241 returning from the Barons' Crusade
- Simon de Montfort, 6th Earl of Leicester, married Eleanor of England, killed at the Battle of Evesham on 4 August 1265
- Guy de Montfort, Count of Bigorre, married Petronille, Countess of Bigorre, on 6 November 1216 and died at the siege of Castelnaudary on 20 July 1220
- Amicie de Montfort, married Gaucher de Joigny, founded the convent at Montargis and died there in 1252
- Petronilla, became abbess of the Cistercian nunnery of St. Antoine's

== Inheritance ==
His French estates passed to his eldest son, Amaury, while his second son, Simon, eventually gained possession of the earldom of Leicester and played a major role in the reign of Henry III of England. He led the barons' rebellion against Henry during the Second Barons' War, and subsequently became the de facto ruler of England.

== Sources ==
- Dunbabin, Jean (2011). The French in the Kingdom of Sicily, 1266–1305. Cambridge University Press.
- Lippiatt, G.E.M. (2017). Simon V of Montfort and Baronial Government, 1195–1218. Oxford University Press.
- Powell, James M. (1986). Anatomy of a Crusade, 1213-1221. University of Pennsylvania Press. ISBN 0-8122-1323-8.
- Sumption, Jonathan. The Albigensian Crusade, 2000
- Herbermann, Charles, ed. (1913). "Simon de Montfort" . Catholic Encyclopedia. New York: Robert Appleton Company.

Peerage of England
Preceded by Robert de Beaumont	Earl of Leicester; 1206–1218	Succeeded by Simon de Montfort
Regnal titles
Preceded by Raymond Roger Trencavel	Viscount of Béziers, Albi and Carcassonne; 1209–1218	Succeeded by Amaury de Montfort
Preceded by Bernard Ato VI	Viscount of Nîmes; 1214–1218	Succeeded by Amaury de Montfort
Preceded by Raymond VI	— DISPUTED — Count of Toulouse; 1215–1218; Disputed by Raymond VI	Succeeded by Raymond VI
Preceded by Simon IV de Montfort	— DISPUTED — Lord of Montfort-l'Amaury c.1188–1218	Succeeded by Amaury VI de Montfort
