= Montfort-l'Amaury =

- Commune
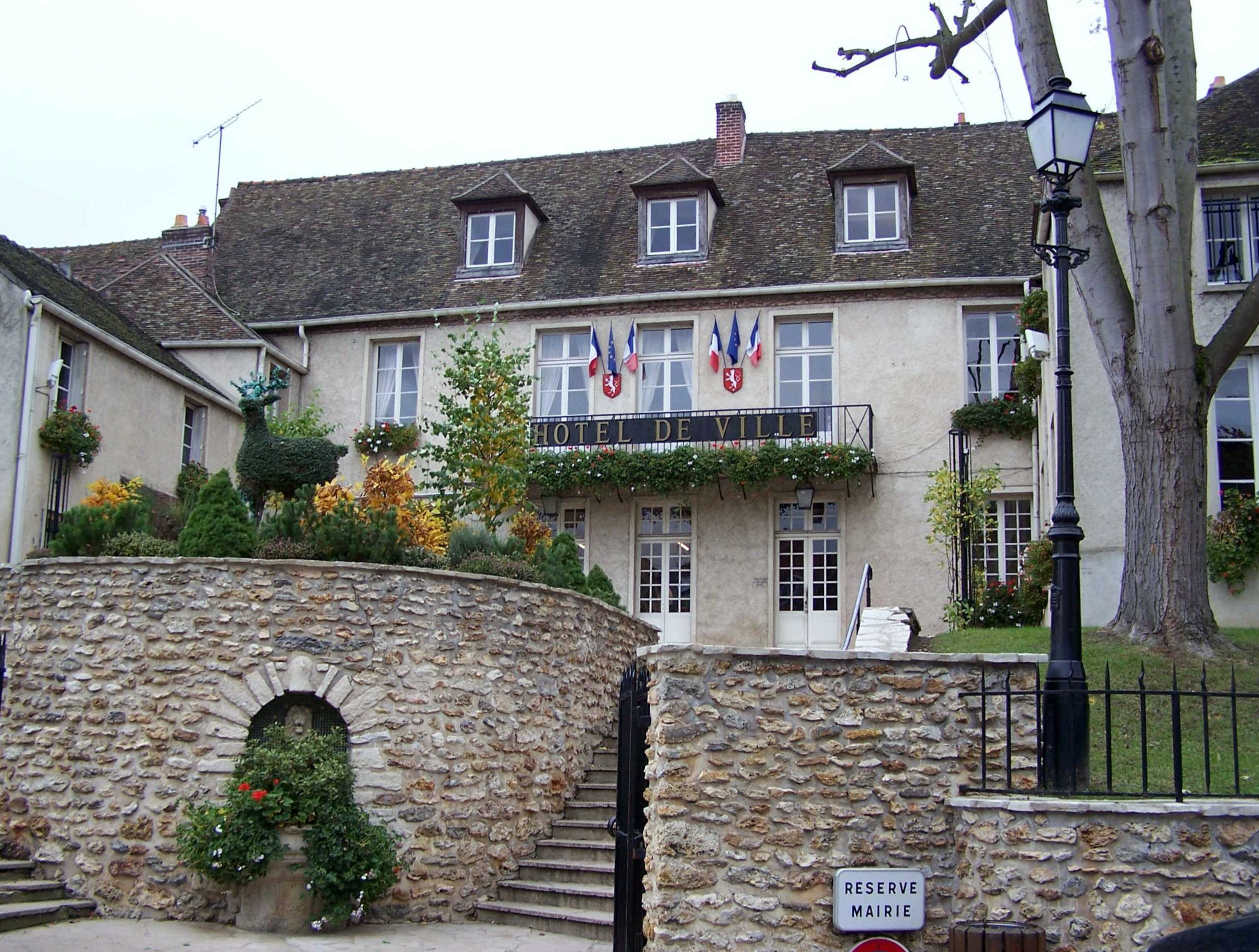
- Town hall

- Coat of arms
- Location of Montfort-l'Amaury
- Location within France Location within Île-de-France (region)
- Coordinates: 48°46′40″N 1°48′36″E
- Country: France
- Region: Île-de-France
- Department: Yvelines
- Arrondissement: Rambouillet
- Canton: Aubergenville
- Intercommunality: CC Cœur d'Yvelines

Government
  - Mayor (2020–2026): Hervé Planchenault
- Area^{1}: 5.71 km^{2} (2.20 sq mi)
- Highest elevation: 183 m (600 ft)
- Lowest elevation: 98 m (322 ft)
- Population (2023): 2,779
  - Density: 487/km^{2} (1,260/sq mi)
- Demonym: Montfortois
- Time zone: UTC+01:00 (CET)
  - Summer (DST): UTC+02:00 (CEST)
- INSEE/Postal code: 78420 /78490
- Website: www.montfortlamaury.fr
- ^{1} French Land Register data, which excludes lakes, ponds, glaciers > 1 km^{2} (0.386 sq mi or 247 acres) and river estuaries.

Montfort-l'Amaury (French pronunciation: [mɔ̃fɔʁ lamoʁi]) is a commune in the Yvelines department in the Île-de-France region, Northern France. It is located 20 km (12 mi) north of Rambouillet. The name comes from Amaury I de Montfort, the first seigneur (lord) of Montfort. It was a seat of several noble families, including the Chardonnay family, who held lands there from the late 13th century.

== Geography ==
Montfort-l'Amaury lies north of the Rambouillet Forest. It is located at the foot of low hills, at about 130 m above sea level. Montfort-l’Amaury has a land area of about 5.71 km², with an elevation of approximately 130 meters above sea level. As of the latest legal census, the population is around 2,790 inhabitants, giving a population density of about 489 persons per square kilometer. Additionally, the composer Maurice Ravel lived in this commune between 1921 and 1937 in a house called Le Belvédère, which is now a museum. The ruins of the castle founded around the year 996 and the church of Saint-Pierre are also notable landmarks.

== History ==
King Robert II built a castle in 996 in the hills of Montfort. Montfort-l'Amaury was the stronghold of the Montfort family from the start of the 11th century. Amaury I built the ramparts.

The Comté de Montfort was related to the Duchy of Brittany following the marriage of Yolande de Dreux-Montfort with Arthur of Brittany in 1294. It returned to the crown of France when Brittany became a part of France under Francis I. The castle was destroyed by the English during the Hundred Years' War.

== Population ==
Historical population
Year	Pop.	±% p.a.
1968	2,074	—
1975	2,319	+1.61%
1982	2,566	+1.46%
1990	2,651	+0.41%
1999	3,137	+1.89%
2007	3,088	−0.20%
2012	3,073	−0.10%
2017	2,940	−0.88%
2023	2,779	−0.93%
Source: INSEE

== Sites of interest ==
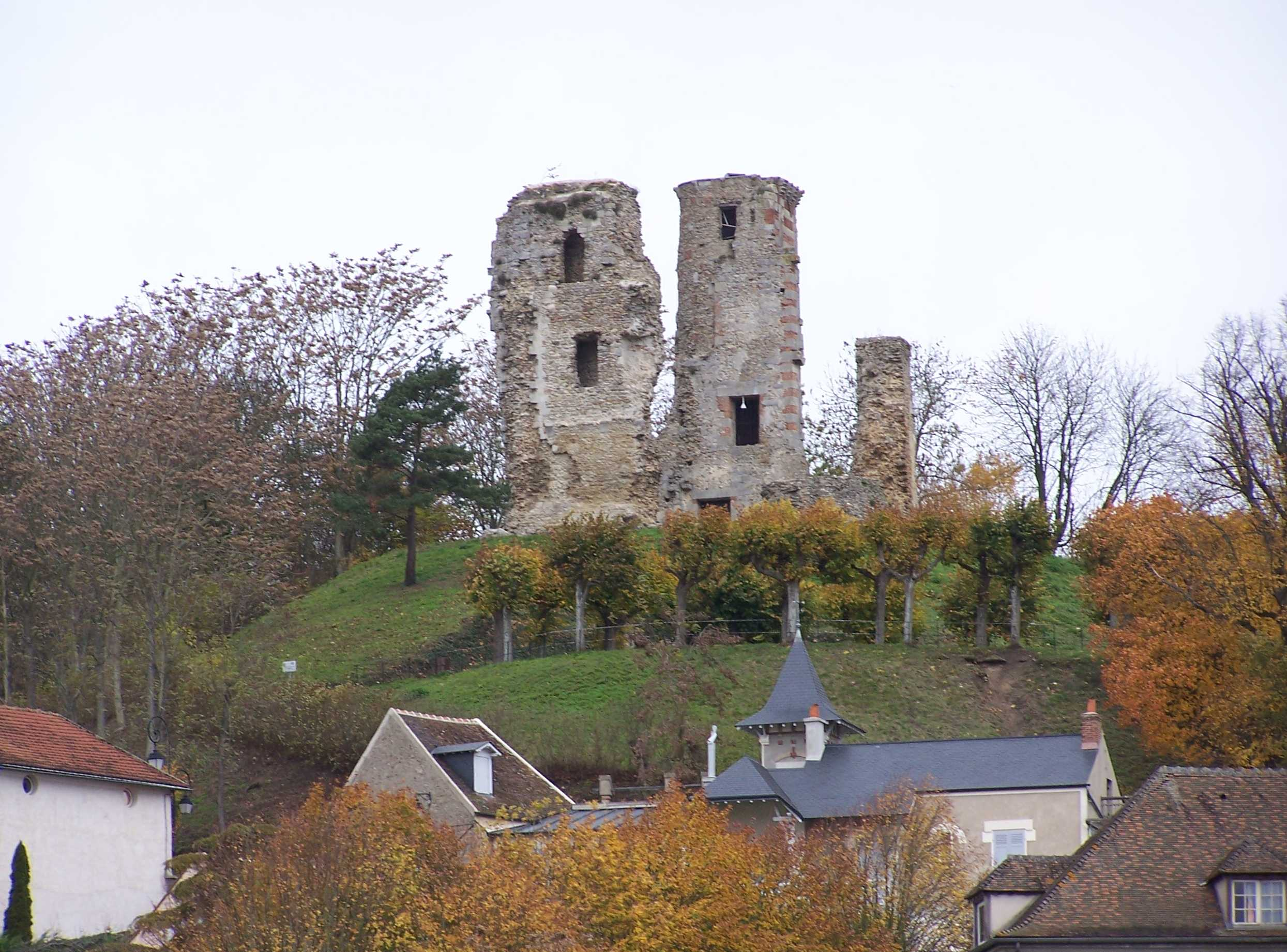
The ruins of the donjon, above the house of Maurice Ravel

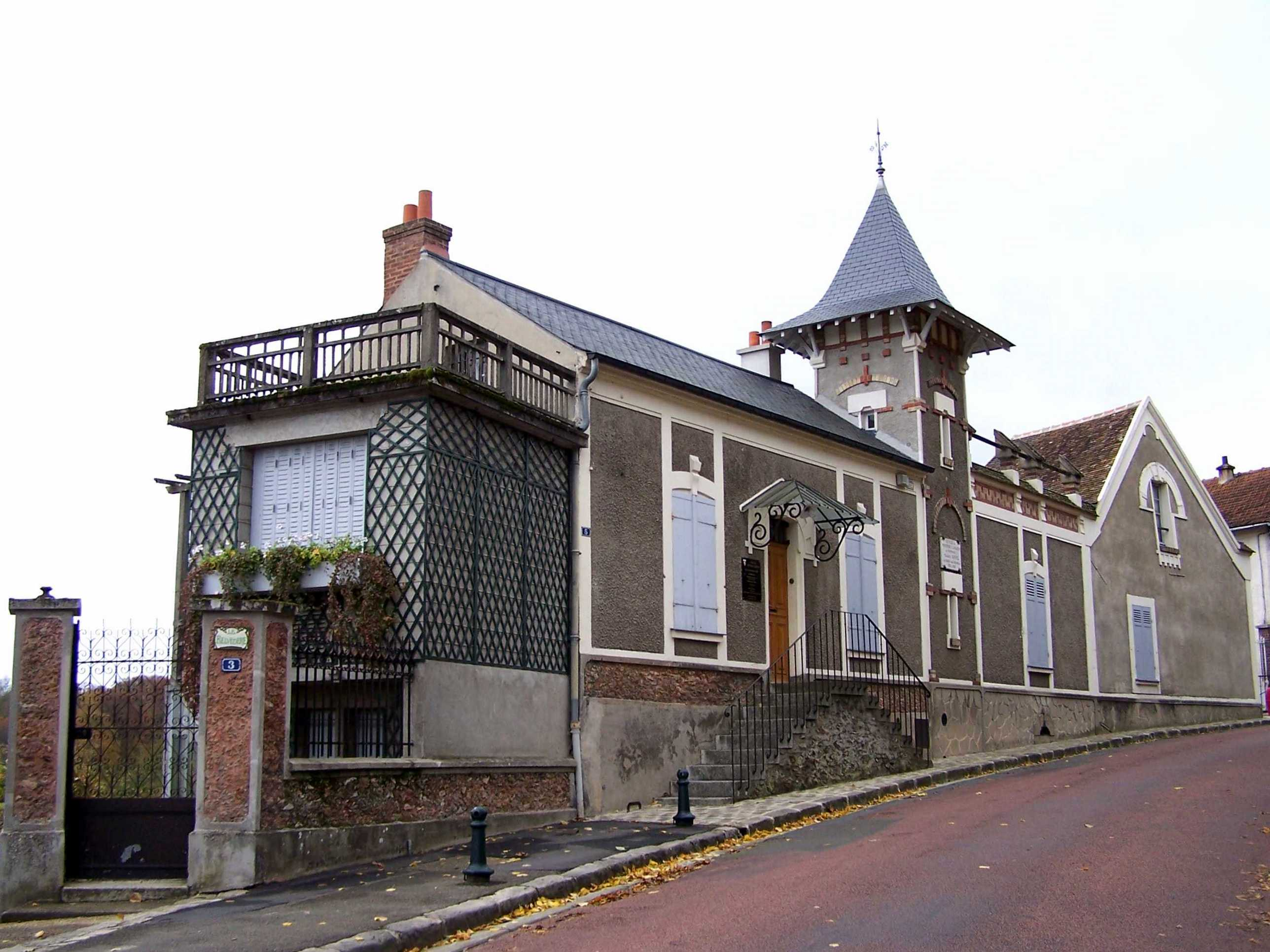
Maurice Ravel's house in Montfort-l'Amaury, where the composer lived from 1921 until his death

- Ruins of the castle 48°46′36″N 1°48′16″E
- Maison de Maurice Ravel, which is now a museum. Maurice Ravel lived here from 1921 until his death.
- Château de Groussay, built in the 19th century

== People ==
- Jean Anouilh, dramatist
- Colette Darfeuil, actress
- Henri George Doll, scientist
- Pierre Dupuis (1610–1682), painter
- Jean Monnet, architect of European Unity
- Simon de Montfort, 6th Earl of Leicester (born in the castle, 1208)
- Maurice Ravel, composer
- Charles Aznavour, singer
- Ambroise Roux (1921-1999), CEO of Compagnie générale d'électricité (later known as Alcatel) from 1970 to 1981, lived and died in Montfort-l'Amaury.

== Twin towns ==
- Nickenich, Germany

== See also ==
- Communes of the Yvelines department
