= Amaury de Montfort (priest) =

English priest

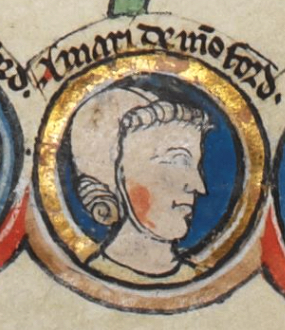

Amaury de Montfort (1242 or 1243 – 1301) was the third son of parliamentary pioneer Simon de Montfort, 6th Earl of Leicester, and Eleanor of England, daughter of King John.

== Biography ==
Amaury entered the priesthood as a young man, and held the positions of Treasurer of York Cathedral, canon of Rouen, Évreux, London and Lincoln. He served as a papal chaplain as well.

After the deaths of his father and older brother Henry de Montfort at the Battle of Evesham in 1265 (by men under the command of then Prince Edward, later Edward I, aka Edward Longshanks), Amaury fled to France with his mother, younger sister, and surviving brothers.

Amaury de Montfort soon began studying medicine and theology at the University of Padua. His brothers, Guy de Montfort, Count of Nola and Simon de Montfort the Younger were seeking their fortunes in Italy. A tragic turn of events lead to the bloody 1271 confrontation between Guy and Simon and their cousin Henry of Almain (also Edward's cousin, by virtue of his father, Henry III being the elder brother of both Eleanor of England and Henry of Almain's father, Richard, Earl of Cornwall).

Henry, whom the de Montfort sons considered a traitor to their father's ideals, was attacked during mass at Viterbo, and murdered on the altar steps, resulting in the excommunication of both de Montfort sons. While Amaury was not in Viterbo, and was not involved in the murder, Edward swore vengeance upon all of Simon de Montfort's sons, Amaury included. Simon the younger died that year, reportedly of a tertian fever, while Amaury managed to appeal to the pope (with the aid of his father-in-law), resulting in his return to the church.

In 1275, after the death of his mother at Montargis Abbey, Amaury, by then a Papal Chaplain, accompanied his younger sister Eleanor de Montfort on a winter sea voyage to Wales and her new husband, Llywelyn ap Gruffudd (the grandson of Llywelyn Fawr). Intercepted at sea by mercenaries in the employ of now King Edward I, both Amaury and Eleanor were taken captive.

Following two paragraphs taken mainly from Chronica, ascribed to William Rishanger, a monk of St. Albans, ed. Henry Thomas Riley [1865], 87, 99.

While Eleanor's captivity was gentle and relatively short-lived (she was married to Prince Llywelyn at King Edward's expense in 1278), Amaury was held 'without rigour' in Corfe Castle and later in Sherborne Castle. After requests from the Pope, Prince Llywelyn and Archbishop John Peckham of Canterbury, Amaury was released after swearing at London not to return to England unless invited by the king.

Upon his release in mid April 1282, Amaury returned to France, never again to see his sister, who died in childbirth that very year, mere months before the death of her husband Llewylyn and the annexation of North Wales to the English crown. Amaury after some years renounced his clerical career and became a knight, apparently dying soon afterwards in Italy, possibly after 1301^{(citation/reference?).}
