= Dictum of Kenilworth =

1266 treaty

Award of reconciliation between the king and the rebels of the Barons' War
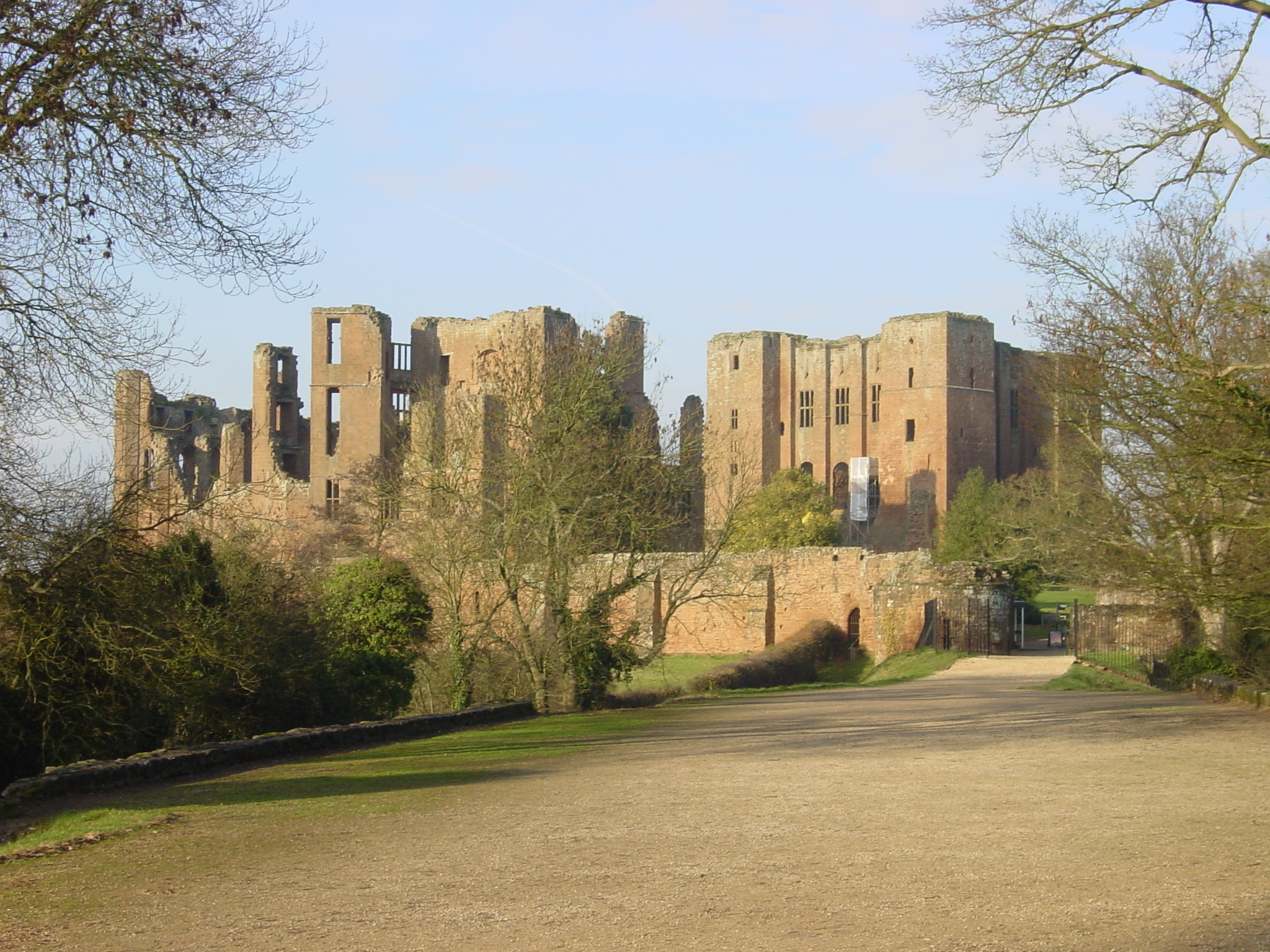
- Kenilworth Castle in Warwickshire
- Type: Edict, award
- Signed: 31 October 1266
- Location: Kenilworth Castle
- Effective: 14 December 1266
- Condition: Restoration of rebels' land, in exchange for fines.
- Language: Latin

Dictum de Kenilworth
- Act of Parliament
- Parliament of England
- Long title: None
- Citation: 51 & 52 Hen. 3
- Territorial extent: England and Wales; Ireland

Dates
- Royal assent: 1266
- Commencement: 22 August 1266 (Note: Start of session.)
- Repealed: England and Wales: 28 July 1863; Ireland: 10 August 1872

Other legislation
- Repealed by: England and Wales: Statute Law Revision Act 1863; Ireland: Statute Law (Ireland) Revision Act 1872

Status: Repealed

Text of statute as originally enacted

The Dictum of Kenilworth (Latin: Dictum de Kenilworth), issued on 31 October 1266, was a pronouncement designed to reconcile the rebels of the Second Barons' War with the royal government of England. After the baronial victory at the Battle of Lewes in 1264, Simon de Montfort took control of royal government, but at the Battle of Evesham the next year Montfort was killed, and King Henry III restored to power. A group of rebels held out in the stronghold of Kenilworth Castle, however, and their resistance proved difficult to crush.

A siege of the castle was started, but through papal intervention King Henry later entered on a more conciliatory path. A commission was appointed to draw up an arrangement that would be acceptable to both sides. The resulting Dictum of Kenilworth offered the rebels the right to buy back forfeited estates, at prices depending on their level of involvement in the rebellion. After initial resistance, the terms were eventually accepted. By the summer of 1267, the country was pacified, and this spirit of reconciliation would last until the 1290s. The Dictum of Kenilworth was later incorporated into the Statute of Marlborough.

== Background ==
At the Battle of Lewes in 1264, the rebellious barons, led by Simon de Montfort, had defeated the royal army and taken King Henry III captive. For the next year, the reins of government were in Montfort's hands, but his support soon began to crumble. On 4 August 1265, Montfort faced an army led by Prince Edward (later King Edward I) and the powerful Earl of Gloucester, who had recently defected to the royalist side, at the Battle of Evesham. The battle resulted in a complete royal victory; Montfort was killed, and King Henry III was restored to full power.

Part of the rebellious forces held out, however, and their stronghold was the virtually impregnable Kenilworth Castle. In the summer of 1266, a siege of the castle was initiated, but the effort proved futile. There were rumours that Montfort's son Simon the Younger was planning an invasion of England from Normandy, and this was the hope that the rebels hung on to. It was in this situation that the papal legate Ottobuono Fieschi exerted his influence, to make the king pursue a more conciliatory policy. In August, the king summoned a parliament at Kenilworth, where the siege was ongoing. He commissioned a number of earls, barons and bishops to draft a treaty of reconciliation.

== The Dictum of Kenilworth ==
The commission was created by Parliament appointing three bishops and three barons, who then selected one more bishop, two earls, and three more barons.

The final committee consisted of the bishops of Exeter, Bath and Wells, Worcester and St. David's, the earls of Gloucester and Hereford, and six barons (Philip Basset, John Balliol, Robert Walerand, Alan la Zouche, Roger de Somery and Warin Basingbourne). This committee was given until All Saints Day (1 November) to come up with provisions for a settlement. The result, known as the Dictum of Kenilworth, was made public on 31 October 1266.

The primary point of the dictum was the re-establishment of royal authority. The Provisions of Oxford, that had been forced on the king were repudiated, and it was made clear that the appointment of ministers was entirely a royal prerogative. King Henry in turn reconfirmed Magna Carta and the Charter of the Forest. At the same time, Henry was faced with the increasing veneration of the fallen Simon de Montfort, whom some were already starting to consider a martyr and a possible saint.

The rebels had previously been completely disinherited, and their land taken into the king's hands. The dictum instead extended a pardon, and restored land to their previous owners, contingent on payment of certain penalties that were proportional to the level of involvement in the rebellion. It was traditional to value land at ten times its annual yield, and most of the rebels were subsequently fined at half of this amount: five times the annual yield of their lands.

Robert Ferrers, Earl of Derby, was singled out in particular for his central involvement in the rebellion, and for him the multiple was seven rather than five. The same was the case for Henry de Hastings, who was the commander of Kenilworth Castle. Those who had not taken part in the fighting themselves, but had incited others to rise up against the king, were fined at two years' value, while those who had been compelled to fight, or played only a minor part, had to pay one year's value of their land. The proceedings from the fines were awarded to royal supporters, some of whom had already been awarded parts of the rebels' land, and now had to give it back.

== Aftermath ==
Hostilities did not end with the publication of the dictum. The garrison at Kenilworth refused to accept the terms given, and held out until 14 December, when deprivation forced them to surrender. In April 1267, the Earl of Gloucester – who had been central both to the royal victory at Evesham and to the drafting of the dictum – turned against the king. He occupied the city of London, and set himself up as the champion of the disinherited. After negotiations involving both Edward and Ottobuono, Gloucester relented, and by June a settlement was reached. Gloucester had forced a change to the conditions of the dictum, whereby the disinherited were allowed to recover their lands before they had paid their fines rather than after; an arrangement that made repayment much easier. In the summer of that year, Prince Edward moved at the Isle of Ely, where the last of the rebels still held out, and forced them into submission under terms favourable to the rebels.

In November 1267, Parliament met at Marlborough in Wiltshire. Here an important provision was issued that would become known to history as the Statute of Marlborough. This statute incorporated the clauses of the Dictum of Kenilworth that dealt with the restoration of royal power, and reconciliation between the loyalists and the rebels. The Statute of Marlborough became a basis for royal government, and the relationship between the king and his subjects, and as such the dictum lived on in English constitutional history.

The spirit of peace and reconciliation established by the Dictum of Kenilworth lasted for the remainder of Henry III's reign and into the 1290s. In 1270, Prince Edward left the country to go on crusade in the Holy Land. When his father died in 1272, Edward felt in a safe enough position to wait until 1274 before returning home to claim the throne.

== Subsequent developments ==
The act was extended to Ireland by Poynings' Law 1495 (10 Hen. 7. c. 22 (I)).

The whole act was repealed for England and Wales by section 1 of, and the schedule to, the Statute Law Revision Act 1863 (26 & 27 Vict. c. 125), which came into force on 28 July 1863.

The whole act was repealed for Ireland by section 1 of, and the schedule to, the Statute Law (Ireland) Revision Act 1872 (35 & 36 Vict. c. 98), which came into force on 10 August 1872.

== Sources ==
- Maddicott, J. R. (1994), Simon de Montfort, Cambridge: Cambridge University Press. ISBN 0-521-37493-6.
- Powicke, F. M. (1947), King Henry III and the Lord Edward: The Community of the Realm in the Thirteenth Century, Oxford: Clarendon Press.
- Powicke, F. M. (1953). The Thirteenth Century: 1216-1307. Oxford: Clarendon Press.
- Prestwich, Michael (1988), Edward I, English Monarchs series, London: Methuen London. ISBN 0-413-28150-7.
- Prestwich, Michael (2005), Plantagenet England: 1225–1360, Oxford: Oxford University Press (pub. 28 July 2005). ISBN 0-19-822844-9.
- Ridgeway, H.W. (2004). "Henry III (1207–1272)". Oxford Dictionary of National Biography (online ed.). Oxford University Press. doi:10.1093/ref:odnb/12950. (Subscription, Wikipedia Library access or UK public library membership required.)
- Rothwell, H., ed. (1975). English Historical Documents III, 1189–1327. London: Eyre & Spottiswoode. ISBN 0-413-23310-3.
