= Eleanor de Montfort =

English noblewoman and Princess of Wales

- Princess of Wales
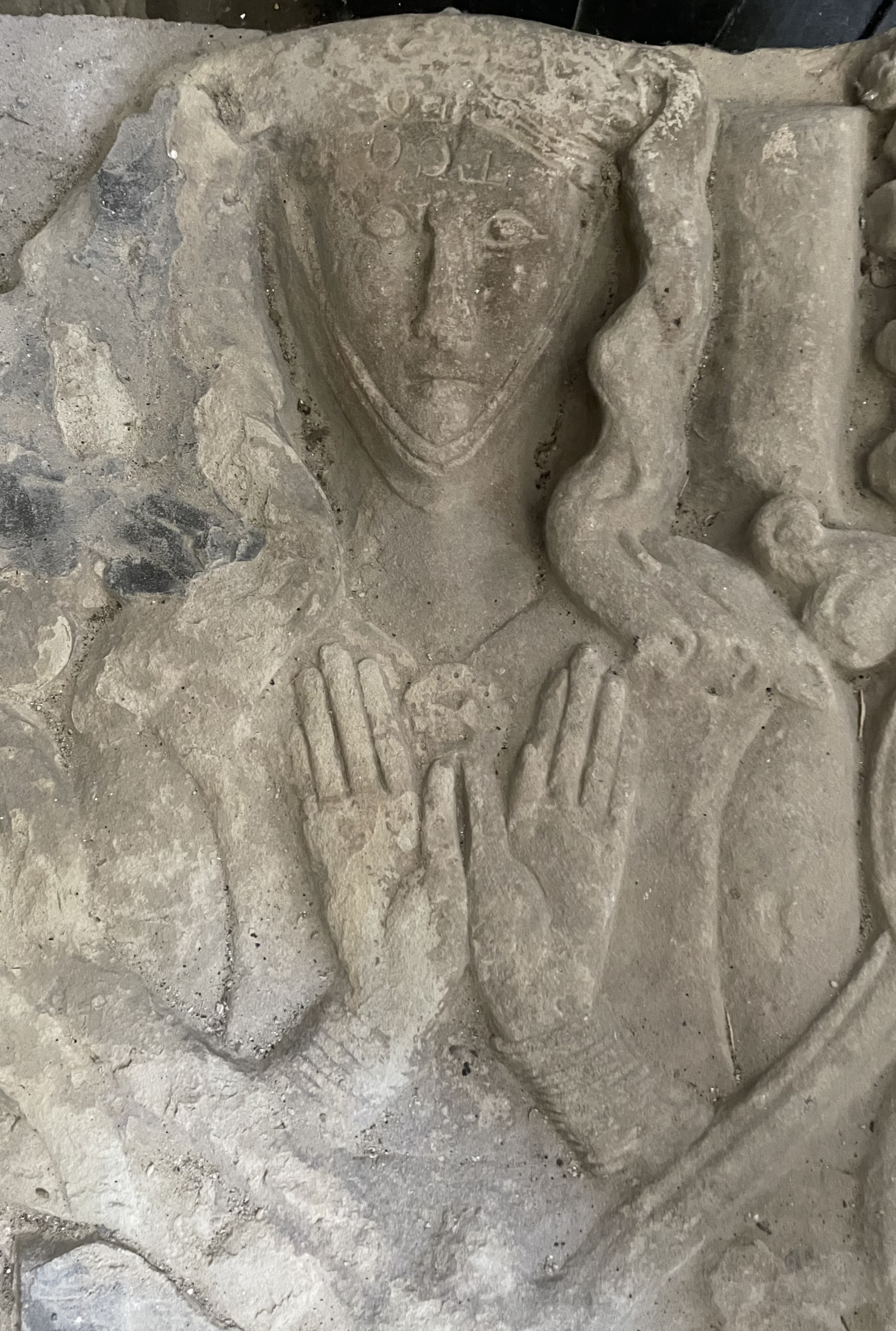
- Sepulchral slab probably depicting Eleanor, St Mary's and St Nicholas', Beaumaris
- Born: 1252
- Died: 19 June 1282 (aged 29–30); Pen y Bryn, Aber Garth Celyn, Gwynedd, Wales
- Spouse: Llywelyn ap Gruffudd (m. 1278)
- Issue: Gwenllian of Wales
- House: Montfort
- Father: Simon de Montfort, 6th Earl of Leicester
- Mother: Eleanor of England

Eleanor de Montfort, Princess of Wales and Lady of Snowdon (1252 – 19 June 1282) was an English noblewoman and Welsh princess through her marriage to Llywelyn ap Gruffudd, who was Prince of Gwynedd, and later, Prince of Wales. She was the daughter of Simon de Montfort, 6th Earl of Leicester and Eleanor of England, Countess of Leicester. She was the second woman who can be shown to have used the title Princess of Wales.

== Early life ==
Eleanor was the youngest child of Simon de Montfort, 6th Earl of Leicester and Eleanor of England. She had five older brothers: Henry de Montfort, Simon de Montfort the Younger, Amaury de Montfort, Guy de Montfort and Richard de Montfort. Her place of birth is unknown.

Eleanor's maternal grandparents were John, King of England and his Queen consort, Isabella of Angoulême. Her maternal uncles included King Henry III of England, and the King of the Romans, Richard of Cornwall. Her maternal aunts included the Queen of Scotland, Joan of England; the Holy Roman Empress, Queen of Germany and Queen of Sicily, Isabella of England; and the wife of the Prince of Wales, Joan, Lady of Wales.

When Eleanor was thirteen years old, her father Simon de Montfort, and brother Lord Henry were killed at the Battle of Evesham (4 August 1265). According to the chroniclers, Nicholas Trivet, William Rishanger and others, Earl Simon had earlier made an alliance with Llywelyn ap Gruffudd, whereby it was agreed that Llywelyn and Eleanor would marry. After Earl Simon's death, his family was forced to flee the Kingdom of England: Countess Eleanor took her daughter to the safety of the Dominican nunnery at Montargis, France, a Montfort foundation.

== Marriage to Llywelyn ap Gruffydd ==
Eleanor's mother Countess Eleanor died in the Spring of 1275. Shortly after, Eleanor de Montfort married Llywelyn ap Gruffudd, Prince of Wales, by marriage per nuncios (proxy marriage) or per verba de presenti, which was endorsed by Canon Law.

== Capture and imprisonment by Edward I ==
Eleanor began the sea voyage from France to north Wales, avoiding making a land passage through England. The two ships carrying Eleanor, her brother Amaury and their entourage, sailing off the south coast of England, were captured by sailors from the port of Bristol, just off the Isles of Scilly. Six named men together with the crews of four ships of Bristol were rewarded with a payment of 220 marks. "Thomas the Archdeacon," who masterminded the capture on behalf of her first cousin Edward I of England was paid £20 in May 1276 by the king's orders, through the sheriff of Cornwall.

Eleanor was taken by ship to Bristol, then held prisoner at Windsor for nearly three years. She was released in 1278 following the signing of the Treaty of Aberconwy between Edward I of England and Llywelyn ap Gruffydd.

== Married life ==
Eleanor and Llywelyn were formally married (secundum formam ecclesie) at the cathedral door, as was the custom, of the cathedral church at Worcester, on the Feast Day of St Edward, 1278; Edward gave the bride, his cousin, away and paid for the wedding feast. Before the wedding mass was celebrated, Edward insisted that Llywelyn should put his seal to an adjustment to the agreement that they had previously made. Llywelyn had no alternative but to comply and affix his seal, and he later stated that he did it under duress, "moved by the fear that can grip a steadfast man."

Following the ceremony, Eleanor became officially known as Princess of Wales and Lady of Snowdon.

== Death and legacy ==
Eleanor had a daughter, Gwenllian of Wales (Welsh pronunciation: [ɡwenˈɬi.an]), to whom she died giving birth on 19 June 1282 at the royal palace of Pen y Bryn in Abergwyngregyn, on the north coast of Gwynedd. Her body was taken across the Lafan Sands to the Franciscan Friary at Llanfaes, Anglesey. The Friary had been founded by Llywelyn ab Iorwerth, known as Llywelyn the Great, the grandfather of Llywelyn ap Gruffudd, in memory of his wife Joan, Lady of Wales (Eleanor's aunt).

On 12 July 1282, members of Eleanor's personal household were given safe-conduct while travelling back into England. Llywelyn ap Gruffudd was killed on 11 December 1282. His one-year-old daughter, Gwenllian, was captured the following year by English forces. Edward I had the child banished to the remote Sempringham Priory in Lincolnshire, where she remained for 54 years until her death in 1337. She was the last of the line on both her mother's and father's sides.

== Sources ==
- Fawcett, Joan M. "The Household Roll of Eleanor de Montfort, 1265." History Today (1951) 1#11 pp. 41–43.
- Kjær, Lars. "Food, drink and ritualised communication in the household of Eleanor de Montfort, February to August 1265." Journal of Medieval History 37.1 (2011): 75–89.
- Norgate, Kate (1894). "Montfort, Eleanor of" . In Lee, Sidney (ed.). Dictionary of National Biography. Vol. 38. London: Smith, Elder & Co.
- Wilkinson, Louise J. Eleanor de Montfort: A rebel countess in medieval England (Bloomsbury Publishing, 2012).
- Wilkinson, Louise J., ed. and trans. The Household Roll of Eleanor de Montfort … (Boydell Press, 2020).
