= Second Barons' War =

1264–67 civil war in England

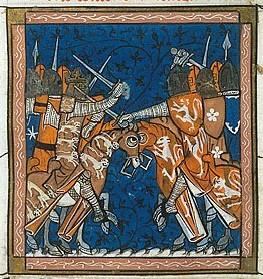
- Illustration depicting the Royals (Henry III) on the left vs the Barons (Montfort) on the right, created between 1332 and 1350
Date	1264–1267
Location	England, Wales
Result	Royalist victory: Capture and imprisonment of King Henry III by baronial forces; Establishment of de facto Protectorate ruled by Simon de Montfort's Parliament until 1265; Restoration of royal authority in 1266; Peace treaty agreed with Dictum of Kenilworth in 1267; Statute of Marlborough issued in 1267; legal confirmation of Magna Carta and Parliament

Belligerents
Royal forces	Baronial forces

Commanders and leaders
King Henry III; Prince Edward; Prince Edmund; Richard of Cornwall; Henry of Almain; Gilbert de Clare (from May 1265); Humphrey de Bohun; John de Warenne; William de Valence; Roger Mortimer	Simon de Montfort †; Gilbert de Clare (until May 1265); Henry de Montfort †; Guy de Montfort; Simon de Montfort the Younger; Peter de Montfort †; Nicholas de Segrave; Humphrey (V) de Bohun; Hugh le Despenser †

The Second Barons' War (1264–1267) was a civil war in England between the forces of barons led by Simon de Montfort against the royalist forces of King Henry III, led initially by the king himself and later by his son, the future King Edward I. The barons sought to force the king to rule with a council of barons, rather than through his favourites. To bolster the initial success of his baronial regime, de Montfort sought to broaden the social foundations of parliament by extending the franchise to the commons for the first time. However, after a rule of just over a year, de Montfort was killed by forces loyal to the king at the Battle of Evesham. The war also involved a series of massacres of Jews by some of de Montfort's supporters (and his sons Henry and Simon) in attacks aimed at seizing and destroying evidence of baronial debts.

== Causes ==
The reign of Henry III is most remembered for the constitutional crisis in this period of civil strife, which was provoked ostensibly by his demands for extra finances, but marked a more general dissatisfaction with Henry's methods of government on the part of the English barons, discontent which was exacerbated by widespread famine.

The French-born Simon de Montfort, Earl of Leicester, had originally been one of the foreign upstarts so loathed by many lords as Henry's foreign councillors. However, having inherited through his mother the English title Earl of Leicester, he married Henry's sister Eleanor with Henry's permission, but without the agreement of the English barons (ordinarily necessary since it was a matter of state). As a result, a feud developed between de Montfort and Henry. Their relationship reached a crisis in the 1250s, when de Montfort was put on trial for actions he took as lieutenant of Gascony, the last remaining Plantagenet lands across the English Channel.

During the reigns of John and Henry III, the Crown periodically raised punitive taxation on the Jews, causing moneylenders to sell their debt bonds cheaply to raise cash to pay their taxes. The bonds were sold to the richest courtiers and supporters of the Crown at cut down prices, leading many indebted middling landowners to lose their lands. This fed into rising anti-Semitic beliefs that were fuelled by the church. Measures against the Jews and controls over debts and usury dominated debates about royal power and finances among the classes that were beginning to be involved in Parliament, and supported de Montfort in the war.

De Montfort took advantage of the resulting rising antisemitism for his own benefit. The alleged murder of Hugh of Lincoln by Jews had led to the hanging of 18 Jews. Official anti-Jewish measures, sponsored by the Catholic Church, combined with resentment about debts among the barons gave an opportunity for de Montfort to target this group and incite rebellion by calling for the cancellation of debts owed to Jews.

Henry also became embroiled in funding a war against the Hohenstaufen, on behalf of Pope Innocent IV, in return for the Hohenstaufen Kingdom of Sicily for his second son Edmund. That made many barons fearful that Henry was following in the footsteps of his father King John and needed to be kept in check like John. When Henry's treasury ran dry, Innocent withdrew the title, and by bestowing it to Charles of Anjou, in effect negated the sale.

Simon de Montfort became leader of those who wanted to reassert Magna Carta and force the king to surrender more power to the baronial council. In 1258, initiating the move toward reform, seven leading barons forced Henry to agree to the Provisions of Oxford, which effectively abolished the absolutist Anglo-Norman monarchy, giving power to a council of twenty-four barons to deal with the business of government, and providing for a great council in the form of a parliament every three years, to monitor their performance. Henry was forced to take part in the swearing of a collective oath to uphold the Provisions.

Seeking to restore his position, Henry in 1259 purchased the support of King Louis IX of France by the Treaty of Paris, agreeing to accept the loss of the lands in France that had been seized from him and from his father King John by Louis and his predecessors since 1202, and to do homage for those that remained in his hands. In 1261, Henry obtained a papal bull releasing him from his oath, and set about reasserting his control of government. The baronial opposition responded by summoning their own Parliament and contesting control of local government, but with civil war looming they backed down and de Montfort fled to France, while the other key opposition leader, Richard de Clare, Earl of Hertford and Gloucester, switched over to the King's side.

Under the Treaty of Lambeth, an arbitration system was agreed upon to resolve outstanding disputes between Henry and the barons, with de Clare as the initial arbiter and the option of appealing his verdicts to Louis IX. However, continued Poitevin influence and the failures and renewal of provocative policies by Henry's government soon inflamed hostility once more. The King's position was further weakened by the death of Richard de Clare and the succession of his son Gilbert, who sided with the opposition, and by the reversal of the papal annulment of his oath to uphold the Provisions.

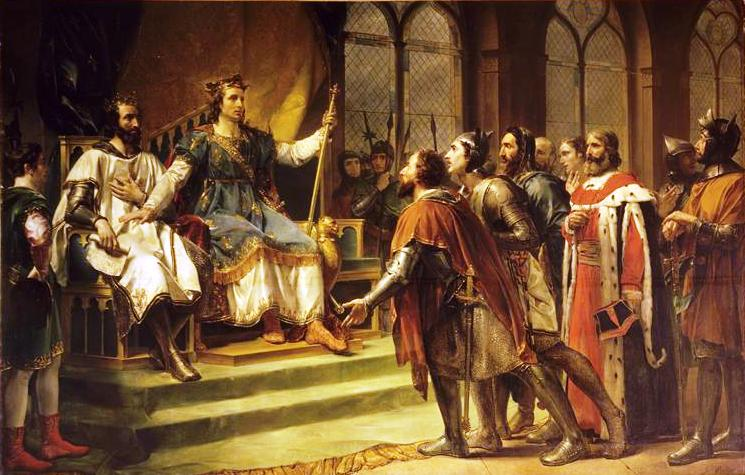
Saint Louis Mediating Between the King of England and His Barons by Georges Rouget, 1820

In April 1263, Simon de Montfort returned to England and gathered a council of dissident barons at Oxford. Fighting broke out in the Welsh Marches, and by the autumn, both sides had raised considerable armies. De Montfort marched on London and the city rose in revolt, trapping the King and Queen at the Tower of London. They were taken prisoner and de Montfort assumed effective control of government in Henry's name. However, his support soon fractured, and Henry regained his liberty.

With violent disorder spreading and the prospect of all-out war, Henry appealed to Louis for arbitration, and, after initial resistance, de Montfort consented. In January 1264, by the Mise of Amiens, Louis declared in Henry's favour by annulling the Provisions of Oxford. Some of the barons who had opposed Henry acquiesced in the verdict, but a more radical faction led by de Montfort prepared to resist any reassertion of royal power, and they and the king gathered their forces for war.

== Course of the war ==
Fighting resumed in February 1264, with attacks by Simon de Montfort's sons Henry and Simon the Younger on royalist supporters in the Welsh Borders. Cancellation of debts (owed to Jews) was part of de Montfort's call to arms.

A series of attacks on Jewish communities followed, organised by key allies of de Montfort, hoping to gain by destroying the records of their debts to moneylenders. These pogroms killed the majority of Jews in Worcester, in this case led by de Montfort's son Henry and Robert Earl Ferrers.

At London, one of his key followers, John fitz John, led the attack and is said to have killed leading Jewish figures Isaac fil Aaron and Cok fil Abraham with his bare hands. He allegedly shared the loot with de Montfort. Five hundred Jews died. Attacks occurred in Winchester, led by the younger Simon de Montfort. Anti-Jewish violence spread to Lincoln and Cambridge, Jewish communities were also targeted at Canterbury, led by Gilbert de Clare, and Northampton.

In April, the elder Simon de Montfort, in control of London, assembled his forces at St Albans and marched to relieve Northampton, which was under siege by the royalists, but he was too late to prevent the town's capture by betrayal. He then moved into Kent and laid siege to the royal stronghold of Rochester Castle, but on hearing reports of a royal advance on London he withdrew most of his forces from the siege to confront this threat. King Henry, however, bypassed the capital and the rebel army and raised the siege of Rochester, before he captured Tonbridge and Winchelsea from the rebels.

Moving into Sussex, Henry was confronted by de Montfort, who had led his army out from London in pursuit. In the Battle of Lewes on 14 May, Henry was defeated and taken prisoner by de Montfort, along with his son Prince Edward and his brother, Richard of Cornwall. While Henry was reduced to a figurehead king, de Montfort broadened parliamentary representation to include groups beyond the nobility, members from each county of England and many important towns. Henry and his son Edward remained effective prisoners. Around this time, de Montfort announced the cancellation of all debt owed to Jews.

The radicalism of de Montfort's subversion of traditional order once again led to a fracturing of his brittle base of support.

In May 1265, Prince Edward escaped from de Montfort's custody at Hereford and assembled a new royalist army at Worcester. He attracted defectors from the baronial cause, most importantly Gilbert de Clare, de Montfort's most powerful ally. Simon was blocked from moving east from Hereford by royalist control of the crossings of the River Severn, completed by Edward's capture of Gloucester. Moving into Wales, de Montfort forged an alliance with the Welsh Prince Llywelyn ap Gruffudd, who provided him with soldiers. An attempt by Simon to ship his forces across the Severn estuary from Newport was thwarted when his transports were destroyed by royalist warships, and he returned to Hereford.

De Montfort's goal now became to unite with the forces of his son Simon the Younger, and engage with the royal army, but the younger Simon moved much too slowly westwards from London. Eventually, Simon the Younger reached the baronial stronghold of Kenilworth, but Edward managed to inflict great losses on his forces, many of whom were quartered outside the castle walls. The elder Simon had taken advantage of Edward's move to Kenilworth to cross the Severn at Kempsey and was on his way to join his son when he was intercepted and decisively defeated by the royalists at the Battle of Evesham on 4 August. Simon and his son Henry were killed in the fighting, and King Henry, whom de Montfort had taken into battle with him, was freed.

The victory at Evesham left the royalists in a dominant position, but the rebels continued to defend their strongholds, most notably Kenilworth. Prince Edward began a Siege of Kenilworth on 21st June, 1266, which dragged on for months. King Henry was persuaded to seek a compromise settlement, and a commission of bishops and barons drafted a proclamation, known as the Dictum of Kenilworth, issued on 31 October. It set terms under which rebels could secure a pardon and regain their confiscated lands on the payment of a heavy fine. The proposal was initially rejected by the rebels, but on 14 December, hunger finally compelled the defenders of Kenilworth to surrender and to accept the terms of the Dictum.

In April 1267, Gilbert de Clare turned again to revolt and occupied London. He was reconciled with Henry by a negotiated settlement in June, which eased the terms of the Dictum, enabling repentant rebels to regain their lands before rather than after paying their fines. That summer also saw the negotiated surrender of the last group of defiant rebels, who had been holding out in The Fens at the Isle of Ely. The total casualties of the war are estimated at 15,000.

== Timeline ==
- 1263 – April – Simon de Montfort, Earl of Leicester, returns to England and gathers opposition forces.
- 1263 – October – Revolt in London leads to King Henry's capture by de Montfort, but he subsequently regains his freedom.
- 1264 – 23 January – Louis IX of France, invited to arbitrate on the dispute, issues the Mise of Amiens, annulling the Provisions of Oxford.
- 1264 – February – Warfare begins in the Welsh Marches. Massacre of the Jews in Worcester.
- 1264 – Easter week – Massacre of 500 Jews in London by Montfort's ally John fitz John
- 1264 – April – The rebels are defeated at Northampton.
- 1264 – 14 May – Simon de Montfort defeats King Henry III in the Battle of Lewes in Sussex, capturing the king and his son Prince Edward.
- 1264 – After Lewes – Simon de Montfort annuls all debts owed to Jews.
- 1265 – 20 January – The first English Parliament conducts its first meeting in the Palace of Westminster.
- 1265 – 28 May – Prince Edward escapes captivity at Hereford.
- 1265 – 1 August – Prince Edward destroys the army of Simon de Montfort's son Simon at Kenilworth.
- 1265 – 4 August – Prince Edward defeats and kills the elder Simon de Montfort in the Battle of Evesham in Worcestershire.
- 1265 – Attacks on Jews in Lincoln by the "Dispossessed" rebel Barons, book keeping records destroyed
- 1266 – Attacks on Jews in Cambridge by the "Dispossessed", book keeping records stolen and taken to Ely
- 1266 – 15 May – The royalists defeat the baronial forces of the Earl of Derby at Chesterfield.
- 1266 – 31 October – Henry issues the Dictum of Kenilworth, offering terms to repentant rebels.
- 1266 – 14 December – The rebels at Kenilworth Castle surrender.
- 1267 – May – Gilbert de Clare, Earl of Gloucester, seizes London.
- 1267 – June – King Henry and Gilbert de Clare agree more lenient terms of submission for rebels.
- 1267 – Summer – The last rebel forces surrender at the Isle of Ely.

== See also ==
- First Barons' War
- Richard de Southchurch
- Henry de Bracton
- The Song of Lewes
- List of English civil wars
