= Battle of Chesterfield =

Skirmish during the Second Barons' War

Coordinates: 53°14′N 1°25′W

- Part of Second Barons' War
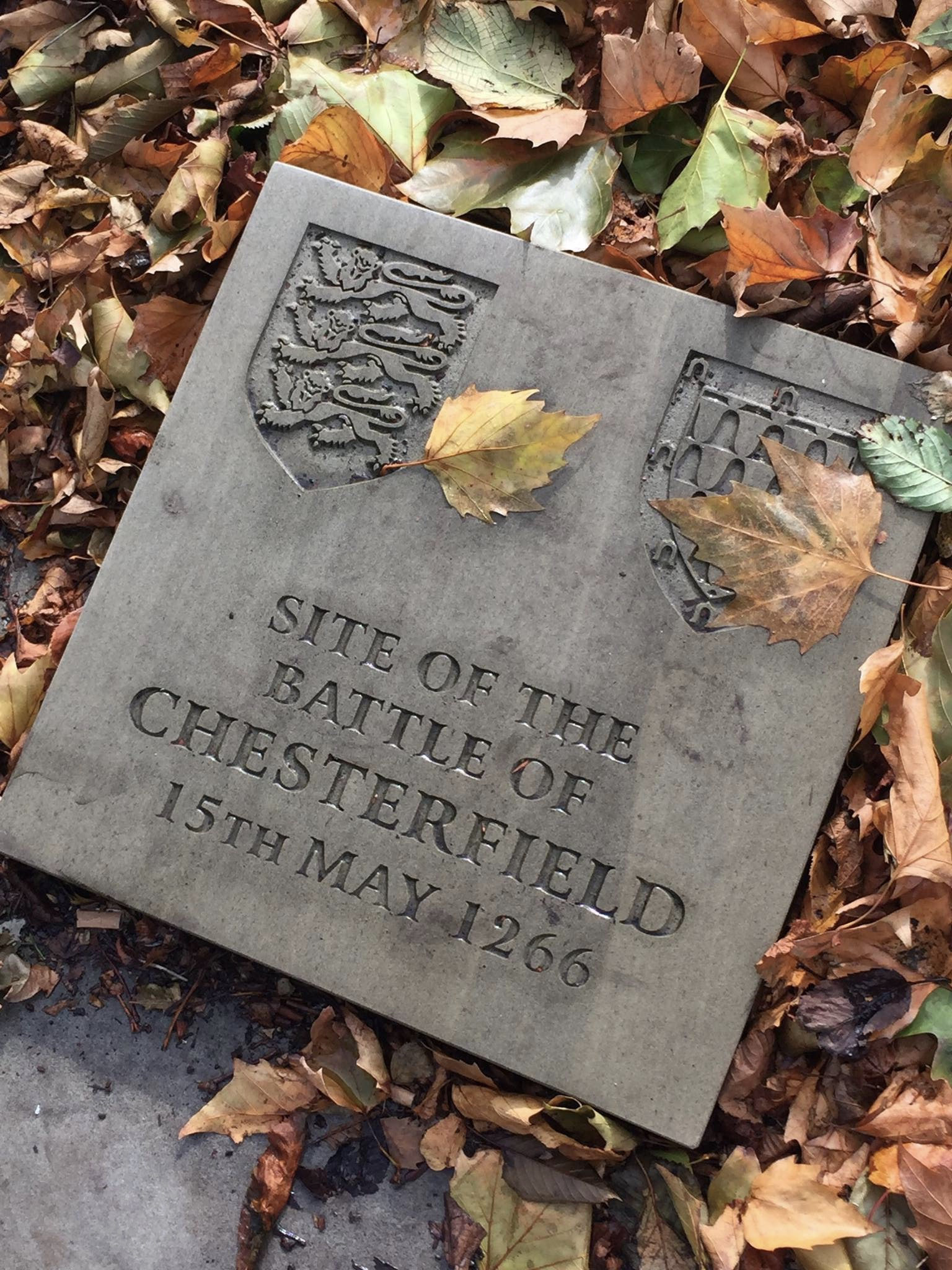
- Commemoration stone in Chesterfield
Date	15 May 1266
Location	Chesterfield, Derbyshire
Result	Royal victory

Belligerents
Royal forces	Baronial forces

Commanders and leaders
Henry of Almain; John de Warenne	Robert de Ferrers (POW); Baldwin Wake; John d'Ayville

The Battle of Chesterfield was a minor skirmish in the latter stages of 13th-century England's Second Barons' War.

== Background ==
The battle was part of the "mopping up" of baronial opposition that resisted Henry III following the Battle of Evesham. The fighting took place in, and around, Chesterfield, Derbyshire on 15 May 1266. The leaders of the barons were Robert Ferrers, Earl of Derby; Baldwin Wake, Lord of Chesterfield; and John d'Ayville. The royalist forces were led by Henry of Almain, nephew to Henry III.

== Battle ==
There are several references to aspects of the battle in chronicles from the period. Thomas Wykes, in his "Chronicon Thomae Wykes" mentions the royalist forces using covered wagons to gain entry to the town. A reference also exists to explain how "the men of Brampton" (a suburb of Chesterfield) rushed to the church at the time of the battle and defended that part of the wall for which they were responsible. Presumably, it would fall to them to repair any damage and they were keen to avoid such costs.

Wykes also explains how Ferrers was stricken by gout at the time of the battle and that the barons' leader was "taken ignobly". It is likely that he was captured in the church. Legend has it that he was betrayed by a woman of the town but there is no contemporary documentary evidence for this claim, nor is there contemporary evidence for the assertion that Ferrers was hiding under sacks of wool stored in the church. According to the chronicles of Walter of Guisborough, John d'Ayville forced his way through the enemy and unhorsed Sir Gilbert Haunsard with his lance, before wounding several others and making his escape.

== Aftermath ==
Following his capture, Robert Ferrers was taken "in irons" to London and, at the Westminster parliament later that year, was "totally disinherited". John d'Ayville was later at the Siege of Kenilworth before surrendering. Baldwin Wake also escaped the fighting and joined with other disinherited barons at the Isle of Axholme before eventually surrendering to Prince Edward, the future Edward I.
