= Eleanor of England, Countess of Leicester =

13th-century English princess and countess

Eleanor
- Countess of Pembroke; Countess of Leicester
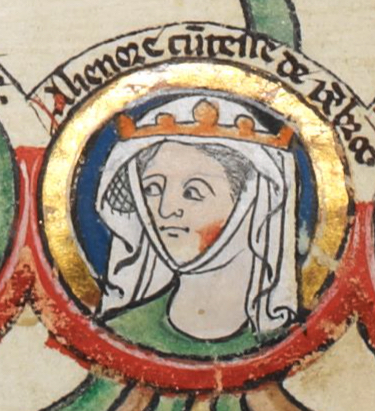
- Born: 1215; Gloucester, Gloucestershire, England
- Died: 13 April 1275 (aged 59–60); Montargis Abbey, France
- Burial: 13 April 1275; Montargis Abbey, France
- Spouse: William Marshal, 2nd Earl of Pembroke (m. 1224; died 1231) Simon de Montfort, 6th Earl of Leicester (m. 1238; died 1265)
- Issue: Henry de Montfort; Simon de Montfort the Younger; Amaury de Montfort; Guy de Montfort, Count of Nola; Joanna de Montfort; Richard de Montfort; Eleanor de Montfort, Princess of Wales
- House: Plantagenet
- Father: John, King of England
- Mother: Isabella of Angoulême

Eleanor of England (also called Eleanor Plantagenet and Eleanor of Leicester) (1215 – 13 April 1275) was the youngest child of John, King of England and Isabella of Angoulême. She married Simon de Montfort, 6th Earl of Leicester.

== Early life ==
At the time of Eleanor's birth in 1215 at Gloucester, King John's London was in the hands of French forces, John had been forced to sign Magna Carta and Queen Isabella was in shame. Eleanor never met her father, as he died at Newark Castle when she was barely a year old. The French, led by Prince Louis the Lion, the future Louis VIII, were marching through the south. The only lands loyal to her brother King Henry III of England were in the Midlands and southwest. The barons ruled the north, but they united with the royalists under William Marshal, 1st Earl of Pembroke, who protected and was regent for the young king Henry, and Louis was defeated in a few battles, and was forced to sign a treaty.

William Marshal died in 1219; Eleanor was promised to his son, also named William. They were married on 23 April 1224 at New Temple Church in London. The younger William was 34 and Eleanor only nine. He died in London on 6 April 1231, days before their seventh anniversary. There were no children of this marriage.

Eleanor had brought a dowry of 10 manors and 200 pounds per year to this marriage. According to the law of the time, widows were allowed to retain one third of the estates of the marriage. However, her brother-in-law Richard took all of the estates and sold many, including her dowry, to pay William's debts. Eleanor strove for many years to recover her lost property.

The widowed Eleanor swore a holy oath of chastity in the presence of Edmund Rich, Archbishop of Canterbury.

== Simon de Montfort ==
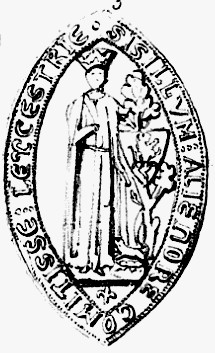
Eleanor's seal as Countess of Leicester

Seven years later, she met Simon de Montfort, 6th Earl of Leicester. According to Matthew Paris, Simon was attracted to Eleanor's beauty and elegance as well as her wealth and high birth. They fell in love and married secretly on 7 January 1238 at the King's chapel in Westminster Palace. Her brother King Henry later alleged that he only allowed the marriage because Simon had seduced Eleanor. The marriage was controversial because of the oath Eleanor had sworn several years before to remain chaste. Because of this, Simon made a pilgrimage to Rome seeking papal approval for their union. Simon and Eleanor had seven children:

1. Henry de Montfort (November 1238 – 1265)
2. Simon de Montfort the Younger (April 1240 – 1271)
3. Amaury de Montfort (1242/1243–1300)
4. Guy de Montfort, Count of Nola (1244–1288)
5. Joanna, born and died in Bordeaux between 1248 and 1251
6. Richard de Montfort (1252–1281)
7. Eleanor de Montfort Princess of Wales (1258–1282)

During the Second Barons' War, Simon de Montfort's victory at the Battle of Lewes in 1264 led to him becoming de facto ruler of England. He tried to set up a reformed government, including the first parliament elected by citizens of the towns, but was unable to retain the support of the other barons. Several switched sides to the royalist cause; especially after the escape of Prince Edward, future Edward I of England, from Simon's custody. Montfort was defeated at the Battle of Evesham on 4 August 1265, where he was killed along with his son. Eleanor fled to exile in France where she became a nun at Montargis Abbey, a nunnery founded by her deceased husband's sister Amicia, who remained there as abbess. There she died on 13 April 1275, and was buried there. She was well treated by Henry, retained her incomes, and her proctors were allowed to pursue her litigation concerning the Leicester inheritance in the English courts; her will and testament were executed without hindrance.

Eleanor's daughter, Eleanor de Montfort, was married, at Worcester in 1278, to Llywelyn ap Gruffudd, Prince of Wales. She would die giving birth to their only child, Gwenllian of Wales. After the conquest of Wales, Gwenllian was imprisoned by Edward I of England, her mother's first cousin, at Sempringham priory, where she died 1337.

== Fiction ==
Eleanor appears as a major character in Sharon Kay Penman's novel Falls the Shadow, where she is called Nell.

Eleanor is the main character in Virginia Henley's historical romance The Dragon and the Jewel, which tells of her life from just before her marriage to William Marshal to right before the Battle of Lewes in 1264. Her romance and marriage to Simon de Montfort are much romanticized in this novel, especially since in real life Simon is killed the year following the Battle of Lewes and the pair had already had all 7 of their children; in the book, Eleanor and Simon have only just had their first two sons. Eleanor makes a second appearance in Henley's The Marriage Prize. Her role in the book is that of the legal guardian to her niece, Rosamond Marshal.

Eleanor appears as a side character in James Blish's novel Doctor Mirabilis, which is primarily about Roger Bacon. Early on, Bacon's mentor Adam Marsh is confessor to Eleanor. He tries to withdraw as her confessor, not stating the reasons, but she deduces the truth: he is too attracted to her beauty and wishes to avoid temptation. Nearer to the end of the book, Bacon visits her after Simon's death. He is commissioned by the Pope to write a book about human longevity and wishes to raise money to write it. Eleanor remembers him as Adam's protege. She gives him a piece of jewellery she has had for most of her life, and when he attempts to refuse it, she insists.

== Sources ==
- Fines, John (1995). Who's Who in the Middle Ages. Barnes & Noble Publishing. p. 164. ISBN 1-56619-716-3.
- Labarge, Margaret Wade; Griffiths, N. E. (1997). A Medieval Miscellany. McGill-Queen's Press. p. 48. ISBN 0-88629-290-5.
- Levin, Carole; Barrett-Graves, Debra; Carney, Jo Eldridge; Spellman, W. M.; Kennedy, Gwynne; Witham, Stephanie (2000). Extraordinary Women of the Medieval and Renaissance World. Greenwood Press, Westport, Connecticut. ISBN 0-313-30659-1.
- Maddicott, J. R. (1996). Simon de Montfort.
- Powicke, F. M. (1949). Ways of Medieval Life and Thought.
- Wilkinson, Louise J., ed. (2020). The household roll of Eleanor de Montfort, Countess of Leicester and Pembroke, 1265 : British Library, additional MS 8877. Woodbridge, UK: Boydell Press. ISBN 978-0-901134-77-6.
