= Anastasia de Montfort =

Italian noblewoman and wealthy heiress

- suo jure Countess of Nola suo jure Dame de Chailly suo jure Dame de Longjumeau
- Born: c. 1274; Italy
- Died: before 15 January 1345
- Noble family: House of Montfort
- Spouses: Romano Orsini, Senator of Rome
- Issue: Roberto Orsini, Count of Nola; Guido Orsini, Count of Pitigliano; Giovanna Orsini
- Father: Guy de Montfort, Count of Nola
- Mother: Margherita Aldobrandeschi, suo jure Countess of Sovana and Pitigliano

Anastasia de Montfort, Countess of Nola (born c. 1274), was a noblewoman and wealthy heiress. She was the eldest daughter of Guy de Montfort, Count of Nola and Margherita Aldobrandeschi. She held the title suo jure Countess of Nola after her father's death in 1291. She also held the titles of suo jure Dame de Chailly and suo jure Dame de Longjumeau. She was the wife of Romano Orsini, Senator of Rome.

== Family ==
Anastasia was born in Italy about 1274, the eldest daughter of Guy de Montfort, Count of Nola, and Margherita Aldobrandeschi, Countess of Sovana and Pitigliano.

Anastasia's father, Guy, fled England in 1266 after he had escaped from prison, eventually arriving in Italy. He entered the service of Charles of Anjou who made him Count of Nola and Vicar-general of Tuscany. On 10 August 1270, Guy married Margherita Aldobrandeschi at Viterbo. In 1271, her father was excommunicated for killing his cousin Henry of Almain inside San Silvestro church. Later he was captured by the Aragonese and died in a Sicilian prison in 1291.

Upon his death, Anastasia became the suo jure Countess of Nola. In an effort to retain her lands, Anastasia's mother married four more times after Guy's death. Her four additional husbands were: Orsello Orsini, Loffredo Caetani, her cousin Guido Aldobrandeschi di Santa Fiora, and Nello de' Pannocchieschi.

== Marriage and issue ==
On 8 June 1293 Anastasia married Romano Orsini (1268–1327), Senator of Rome and son of Gentile II Orsini, Senator of Rome and Claricia de Ruffo. The marriage had been arranged by Cardinal Napoleon Orsini, who was her mother's guardian. Anastasia, being Margherita's eldest daughter and heiress, eventually brought the rich Aldobrandeschi and Sovana inheritances into the Orsini family.

Together Romano and Anastasia had:

- Roberto Orsini, Count of Nola (1295 - 15 January 1345), married Sibilla de Balzo de Baux (1296 - 1375) the daughter of Hugues del Balzo, Count of Soleto and Seneschal of Naples and Jacopa della Marra.
- Guido Orsini, first Count of Pitigliano (died after 1348), married Agostina della Gherardesca, by whom he had issue.
- Giovanna Orsini, married in 1334 Nicolo Caetani by whom she had issue.

Anastasia died on an unknown date, which occurred sometime before her eldest son, Roberto's death on 15 January 1345 as he had succeeded her as Count of Nola. Her husband Romano died in 1327.

== Sources ==
- Baldwin, David (2010). Elizabeth Woodville: Mother of the Princes in the Tower. The History Press.
- Tufano, L. (2023). "Lords facing Death: The Choices of the Orsini, Counts of Nola". In Antonetti, Antonio; Berardi, Riccardo (eds.). The Various Models of Lordship in Europe between the Ninth and Fifteenth Centuries. Cambridge Scholars Publishing. pp. 320–348. ISBN 978-1-5275-2909-0.
- Waley, Daniel (2013). Mediaeval Orvieto. Cambridge University Press. ISBN 978-1-107-62172-5.
