= Gwenllian of Gwynedd =

Gwenllian of Gwynedd may refer to:

- Gwenllian ferch Gruffydd
- Gwenllian ferch Llywelyn
