= Greenhill, Evesham =

Hill in Worcestershire, England

Coordinates: 52.103°N 1.944°W

Greenhill
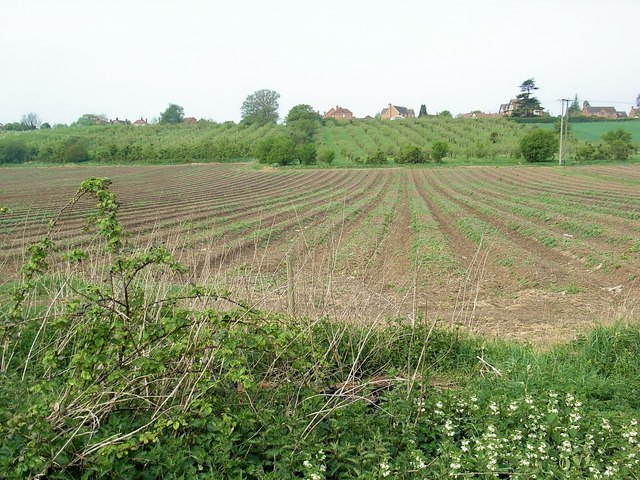
- Orchards on Greenhill

- Location within Worcestershire
- OS grid reference: SP0383545010
- District: Wychavon
- Shire county: Worcestershire
- Region: West Midlands
- Country: England
- Sovereign state: United Kingdom
- Post town: EVESHAM
- Postcode district: WR11
- Dialling code: 01386
- Police: West Mercia
- Fire: Hereford and Worcester
- Ambulance: West Midlands
- UK Parliament: Mid Worcestershire

Greenhill is a hill just north of Evesham, Worcestershire and was part of the site of the Battle of Evesham. In the battle, Simon de Montfort was defeated and killed on 4 August 1265. King Henry's son, Prince Edward, later Edward I used it as his base in the battle from where he launched his attack on Simon de Montfort's forces which were gathered around Evesham Abbey.
