= Henry de Montfort =

English noble (1238–1265)

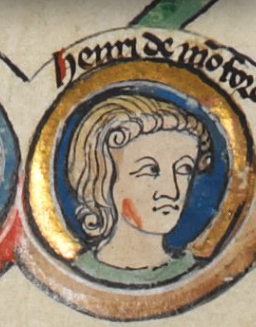
- Born: November 1238; Kingdom of England
- Died: 4 August 1265 (aged 26); Evesham
- Burial place: Evesham Abbey
- Parents: Simon de Montfort, 6th Earl of Leicester (father); Eleanor of England (mother)

Sir Henry de Montfort (November 1238 – 4 August 1265) was the son of Simon de Montfort, 6th Earl of Leicester, and with his father played an important role in the struggle of the barons against King Henry III. Henry's mother was Princess Eleanor of England, a daughter of King John, whose marriage to Simon further increased the foreign influence begun by the king, which was to result in great hostility by those very barons who later revolted against the king.

== Life ==
Henry's father was Simon de Montfort, the leader of the English Barons in the Second Barons' War. Simon was the younger son of Simon de Montfort, 5th Earl of Leicester, a French noble who had been barred from his English titles and claims due to his allegiance to the French crown. Upon his father's death, the younger Simon had traded his interests in the family's French titles with his older brother for the sole possession of the English claims, and moved to England in 1229 to assert them. Becoming a favorite of Henry III, the younger Simon de Montfort received permission to marry the king's sister Eleanor of England, a jump in social status that alarmed the English nobility. In gratitude for the King's permission and support, the first son was named Henry in his honor.

== Second Barons' War ==
Despite this relationship, Henry de Montfort sided with his father and the other nobles in revolt against his namesake in the Second Barons' War, with his father emerging as the leader of the rebellion and eventually the de facto leader of the nation.

In January 1264, Henry was one of the deputies sent to represent the barons at the Mise of Amiens. When the Mise was set aside he commanded a body of troops despatched to secure the Welsh border. On 28 February, he stormed and sacked Worcester, and soon afterwards took Gloucester, but on Edward's approach he made a truce with him and retired to Kenilworth. With his brother Guy de Montfort, he led the vanguard at the battle of Lewes, 14 May 1264. After the victory, on 28 May, he was made constable of Dover Castle, Warden of the Cinque Ports, and treasurer of Sandwich.

When the siege of Gloucester began in 1265, Henry de Montfort and Humphrey de Bohun, holding the King and Prince Edward (later Edward I) as prisoners, spent two weeks fortifying the town and castle. Henry then accompanied his father to Evesham, where they intended to rendezvous with Henry's younger brother, Simon de Montfort the Younger. Instead they met Prince Edward, who had ambushed the younger de Montfort's army and then marched under its stolen Montfort banners to lure Henry and the elder Simon into a trap.

The final act was played out in a monstrous summer storm, [in] 'such a downpour of rain, such thunder and lightning, ... the darkness was so profound, that though it was dinner-time those who sat down to eat could scarcely see the food before them'. The first of the nobles to fall in battle was Henry de Montfort, 'first born son and heir, in full view of his father, perished, split by a sword.

== Aftermath for Henry's family ==
Thus the whole weight of the battle fell upon the earl of Leicester, who was an old and shrewd warrior. He stood the shock like a strong tower; but, surrounded by few followers, and overcome by numbers, he fell, and thus terminated an hereditary prowess, rendered famous by many glorious deeds.

Henry's brother Simon arrived at Evesham in time to see their father's head mounted on a spear. Another brother, Guy de Montfort, was captured during the battle and imprisoned. Guy later escaped and joined the younger Simon in flight to Europe. They found fortune in the service of Charles of Anjou, and later avenged the deaths of their father and brother by killing Henry of Almain, the nephew of the King, and their own cousin. This act taking place in a church, the brothers were excommunicated, which retracted sympathy for them in England. Simon died soon thereafter. As Count of Nola, Guy had two daughters, becoming in time an ancestor to several European royal families, including the British. Another brother, Amaury de Montfort, also fled to Italy. A cleric, he worked in the papacy before accompanying his sister Eleanor de Montfort to Wales for her marriage to Llywelyn ap Gruffudd, Prince of Wales. Captured by mercenaries in the employ of King Edward, the siblings were eventually released and Eleanor's marriage took place. Eleanor died on 19 June 1282 giving birth to Gwenllian of Wales. Amaury returned to the continent, worked as a cleric, and died sometime after 1301.

== Sources ==
- Maddicott, J.R. Simon de Monfort, 1996
- Henry de Montfort - the stuff of legends

Preceded by Roger de Leybourne	Lord Wardens of the Cinque Ports; 1264	Succeeded by Matthew de Hastings
