= Siege of Kenilworth =

Siege during the Second Barons' War

- Part of Second Barons' War
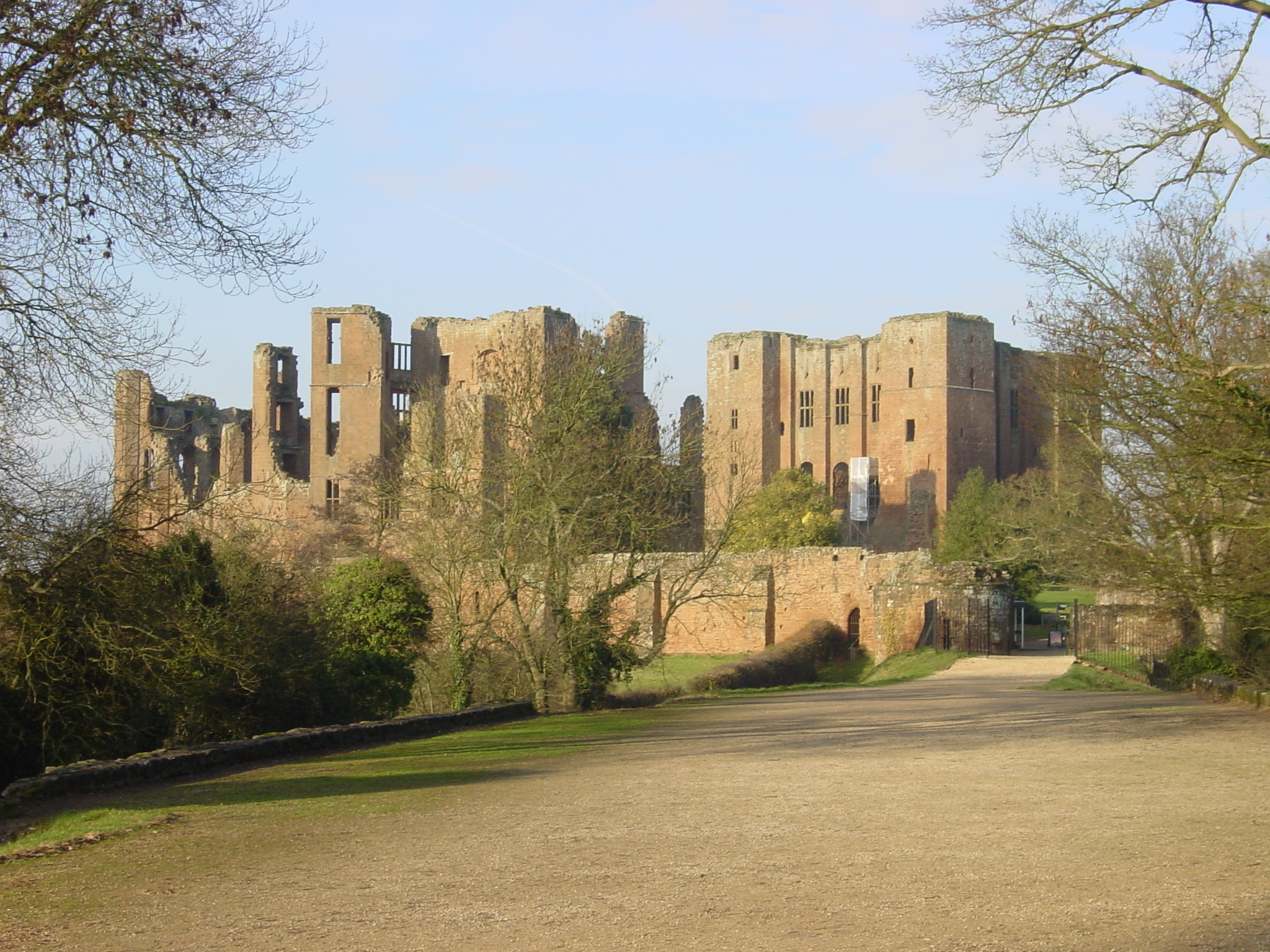
- Kenilworth Castle
Date	21 June – 13 December 1266
Location	Kenilworth Castle, Warwickshire 52.3479°N 1.5925°W
Result	Royal victory: Dictum of Kenilworth

Belligerents
Royal forces	Baronial forces

Commanders and leaders
Henry III; Prince Edward; Prince Edmund; John de Warenne	Henry de Hastings; Simon de Montfort the Younger

Strength
Unknown	c. 1,200

Casualties and losses
Unknown	Unknown, all survivors captured

The siege of Kenilworth (21 June – December 1266), also known as the great siege of 1266, was a six-month siege of Kenilworth Castle and a battle of the Second Barons' War. The siege was a part of an English civil war fought from 1264 to 1267 by the forces of Simon de Montfort against the Royalist forces led by Prince Edward (later Edward I of England). The siege was one of few castle attacks to take place during the war.

== Castle defences ==
Kenilworth Castle's structure was unique and contributed to the longevity of the siege. The castle was a formidable structure due to its heavy defences. The most notable defence was a dam to the south of the castle, across which a causeway led from the entrance to the bailey and keep. Behind the dam was an artificial lake along the south and west sides of the castle, protecting it from a land approach. Ditches along the north side and a second pool on the east side of the causeway extended the water protection to surround the castle.

== Siege ==
The feudal summons for the siege was pushed back from December 1265, finally occurring on 21 June the next year. From that point on, the siege occurred in earnest. The castle's garrison was large, over a thousand, usually estimated at twelve hundred men, and active in defending themselves. Outside of the castle was the feudal host of England as summoned by Henry III, along with his sons, the Lord Edward and Edmund, who had been attempting to contain the garrison since the prior autumn.

The attack on Kenilworth Castle began on 21 June. It was the largest siege to ever occur in England. The royal forces tried all manners of devices. Numerous stone-throwing devices, presumably trebuchets, were brought to the siege, as well as "turres ligneas", or wooden towers. An "ursus" or "bear" was built, with separate compartments for archers. Barges were sent from Chester to attempt an attack via the lake; this did not work.

Rishanger wrote “ “On the part of Lord Edmund, the king’s son, a great wooden tower was constructed with deliberate effort—very costly, and of astonishing height and breadth. It was ingeniously placed against the wall, and within it, in various compartments, were stationed two hundred crossbowmen or more, so that by launching bolts and arrows from within, they might inflict damage on those enclosed.But a mangonel (siege engine) was erected inside [the besieged area], and it did not cease until, by the repeated battering of stones, it had broken through and shattered the tower.Another machine, also from the king’s side and greatly admired, was erected—so large that it was called “the Bear.” It contained various compartments within to house archers and was raised to harm the besieged. Against it, a certain stone-throwing device, cleverly constructed, struck back with such force that for a long time it lost its ability to deliver and inflict damage.”

== Dictum of Kenilworth ==
Archbishop William Freney tried to negotiate with the garrison, but was refused entry. Time, however, was the only weapon left at their disposal, and the patient waiting finally paid off; with the garrison running out of food and suffering from disease, they finally surrendered on 13 December 1266 and accepted the terms of the Dictum of Kenilworth, which later became part of the Statute of Marlborough, four chapters of which are still in force in English law.
