= The Song of Lewes =

C. 1264 Latin poem

The Song of Lewes, sometimes written as The Battle of Lewes, (c. 1264) is a Latin poem of 968 lines in Goliardic manner, recording, celebrating, and justifying the victory of Simon de Montfort at the Battle of Lewes.

The poem criticizes Henry III of England for his reliance on favourites. It depicts the pride and ferocity of Prince Edward (the future king Edward I of England), but criticizes Edward's inconstancy.

== Origins ==
The poem is taken to be written by a cleric closely associated with de Montfort's household—hence its many Biblical references and its knowledge of the baronial constitutional position.

== Themes ==
The first part of the poem, lines 1-484, is concerned with the actual battle, designating the (outnumbered) de Montfort as David to Henry III of England's Goliath.

The second part (lines 485–968) reflect the constitutional debate, beginning with a statement of the royalist position that "the degenerate race of the English, which used to serve, inverting the natural order of things, ruled over the king and his children". In response, the Song points out that the king fell under natural law, citing the case of the fall of King Saul for breaking the law ("quia leges fregit"). Henry's personal rule, and reliance on favourites, was then condemned. The alternative the Song proposed was the action of the community of the realm (or at least of that part most involved with the kingdom and its laws: "Therefore the community of the realm take counsel, and let there be decreed what is the opinion of the commonalty, to whom their own laws are best known".

=== Princely character ===
The Song of Lewes also provided a telling description of Prince Edward: "He is a lion by his pride and ferocity; by his inconstancy and changeableness he is a pard".

== See also ==
- Peatling Magna
- The Vows of the Heron
