= Battle of Lewes =

1264 battle of the Second Barons' War

- Part of Second Barons' War
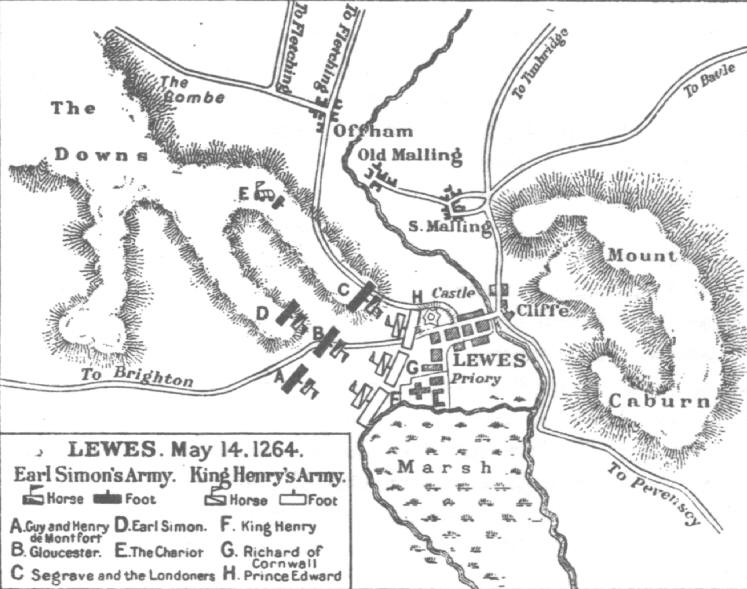
- Plan of the Battle of Lewes
Date	14 May 1264
Location	Lewes, Sussex 50°52′43″N 0°0′50″W
Result	Baronial victory

Belligerents
Royal forces	Baronial forces

Commanders and leaders
King Henry III (POW); Prince Edward (POW); Richard of Cornwall (POW); Humphrey de Bohun (POW); John de Warenne; William de Valence; Roger Mortimer (POW)	Simon de Montfort; Gilbert de Clare; Nicholas de Segrave; Henry de Montfort; Guy de Montfort; Humphrey (V) de Bohun; Hugh le Despenser

Strength
~10,000	~5,000

Casualties and losses
2,700	Unknown

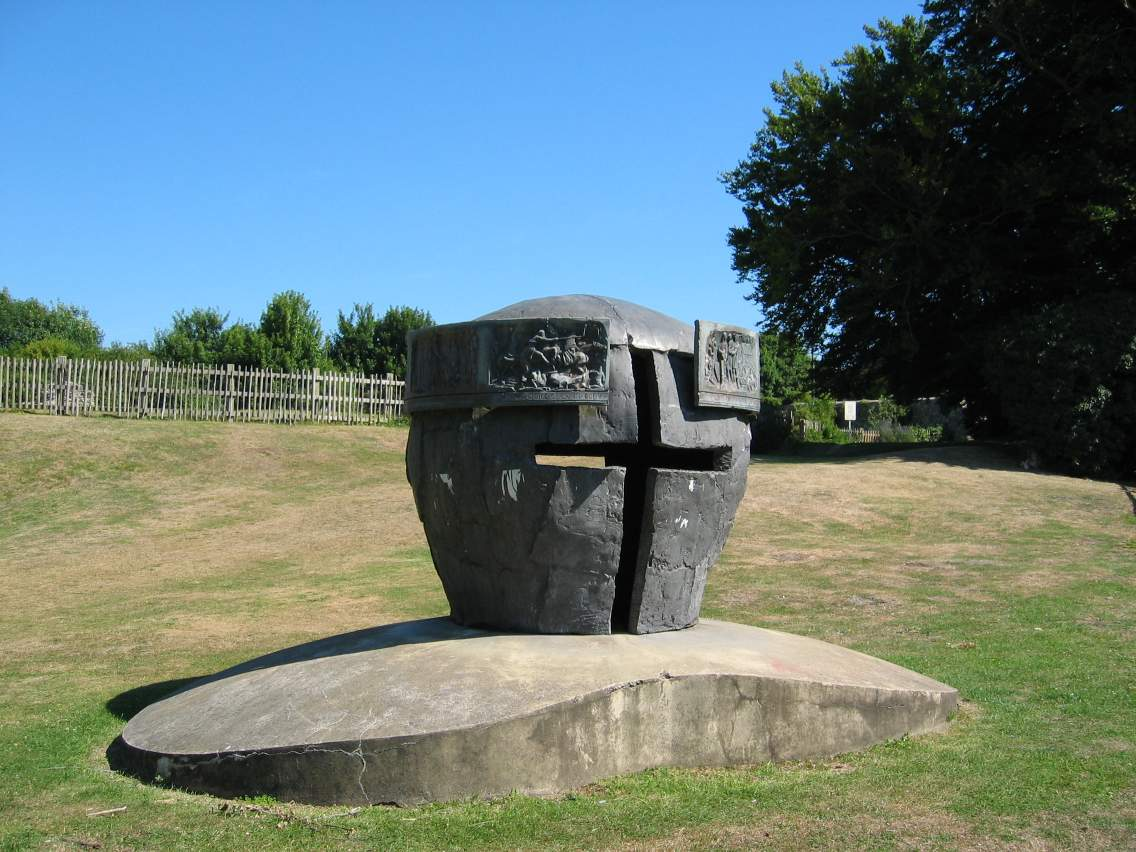
Monument to the Battle of Lewes

The Battle of Lewes was one of two main battles of the conflict known as the Second Barons' War. It took place at Lewes in Sussex, on 14 May 1264. It marked the high point of the career of Simon de Montfort, 6th Earl of Leicester, and made him the "uncrowned King of England". Henry III's forces left the safety of Lewes Castle and St. Pancras Priory to engage the barons in battle and were initially successful, with Henry's son Prince Edward routing part of the baronial army with a cavalry charge. However, Edward pursued his quarry off the battlefield and left Henry's men exposed. Henry was forced to launch an infantry attack up Offham Hill where he was defeated by the barons' men defending the summit. The royalists fled back to the castle and priory and the King was forced to sign the Mise of Lewes, ceding many of his powers to de Montfort.

== Background ==
Henry III was an unpopular monarch due to his autocratic style, displays of favouritism and refusal to negotiate with the barons. The barons eventually imposed a constitutional reform known as the Provisions of Oxford upon Henry, including provision for a thrice-yearly meeting led by Simon de Montfort to discuss matters of government. Henry sought to escape the restrictions of the provisions and applied to Louis IX of France to arbitrate in the dispute. Louis agreed with Henry and annulled the provisions. Montfort was angered by this and rebelled against the King along with other barons in the Second Barons' War.

The war was not initially openly fought as each side toured the country to raise support for their army. A series of massacres of Jews in Worcester, London, Canterbury and other cities was conducted by Montfort's allies.

By May, the King's force had reached Lewes where they intended to halt to allow reinforcements to reach them. The King encamped at St. Pancras Priory with a force of infantry, while his son, Prince Edward (later King Edward I), commanded the cavalry at Lewes Castle 500 yards (500 m) to the north. De Montfort approached the King with the intention of negotiating a truce or, failing that, drawing him into open battle. The King rejected the negotiations, and de Montfort moved his men from Fletching to Offham Hill, a mile to the north-west of Lewes, in a night march that surprised the royalist forces.

== Deployment ==
The royalist army approached twice the size of de Montfort's. Henry commanded the centre, with Prince Edward, William de Valence, 1st Earl of Pembroke, and John de Warenne, 6th Earl of Surrey, on the right; and Richard, 1st Earl of Cornwall, and his son, Henry of Almain, on the left. The barons held the higher ground overlooking Lewes and had ordered their men to wear white crosses as a distinguishing emblem. De Montfort split his forces into four parts, giving his son, Henry de Montfort command of one quarter; Gilbert de Clare with John FitzJohn and William of Montchensy another; a third portion consisting of Londoners was placed under Nicholas de Segrave whilst de Montfort himself led the fourth quarter with Thomas of Pelveston.

== Battle ==
The baronial forces commenced the battle with a surprise dawn attack on foragers sent out from the royalist forces. The King then made his move. Edward led a cavalry charge against Segrave's Londoners, placed on the left of the baronial line, that caused them to break and flee to the village of Offham. Edward recklessly pursued them for some 4 miles (6 km), thus separating his cavalry from the battle and leaving the King unsupported. Henry chose to launch an attack with his centre and right divisions straight up Offham Hill into the baronial line, which awaited them at the defensive position at the top of the hill. Cornwall's division faltered almost immediately, but Henry's men fought on until compelled to retreat by the arrival of de Montfort's men who had been held back as the baronial reserve.

The King's men were forced back down the hill and into Lewes where they engaged in a fighting retreat to the castle and priory. Edward returned with his weary cavalrymen and launched a counterattack. However, upon locating his father, Edward was persuaded that, with the town now ablaze and many of the King's supporters having fled, it was time to accept de Montfort's renewed offer of negotiations. The Earl of Cornwall was captured by the barons when he was unable to reach the safety of the priory and, being discovered in a windmill, was taunted with cries of "Come down, come down, thou wicked miller."

== Aftermath ==
The King was forced by the barons to sign the so-called Mise of Lewes. Though the document has not survived, it is clear that Henry was forced to accept the Provisions of Oxford, while Prince Edward remained a hostage of the barons. This effectively put de Montfort in a position of ultimate power, which would last until Prince Edward's escape, and de Montfort's subsequent defeat and death at the Battle of Evesham in August 1265. Following the battle, debts to Jews were cancelled, and the debt records destroyed; this had been a key war aim of the barons.

In 1994, an archaeological survey of the cemetery of St Nicholas Hospital in Lewes revealed the remains of bodies that were thought to be combatants from the Battle of Lewes. In 2014, it was stated that some of the skeletons might be much older, with a skeleton known as "skeleton 180" being contemporary with the Norman invasion.

== Location ==
There remains some uncertainty over the precise location of the battle, with Offham Hill's eastern and lower slopes now covered by modern housing. Recently, a new consensus on the location of the main engagement places it on the current location of HM Prison Lewes. Contemporary sources suggest the initial engagement took place along the approximate lines of what is now Nevill Road. The top and southern slopes of the hill remain accessible by footpaths across agricultural land, and the ruins of the priory and Lewes castle itself are also open to the public.

== See also ==
- The Song of Lewes
