= Gwenllian of Wales =

Welsh princess; daughter of Llywelyn II

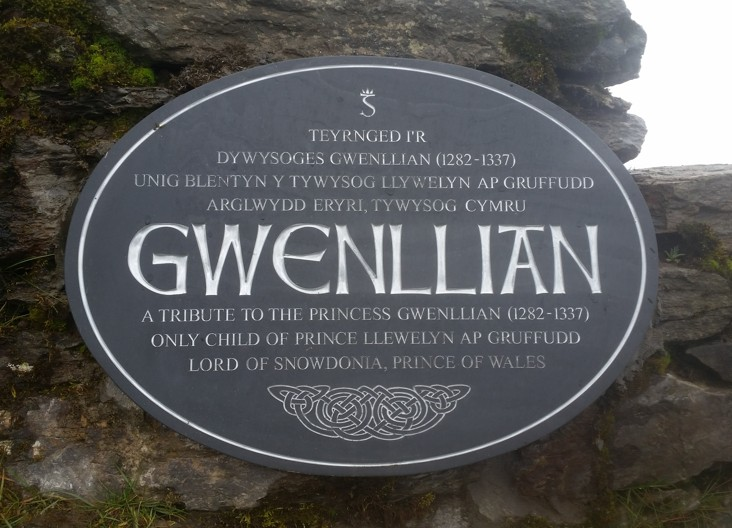
- The Gwenllian memorial at the summit of Snowdon (Yr Wyddfa)
- Born: June 1282; Abergwyngregyn, Wales
- Died: 7 June 1337 (aged 54–55); Sempringham Priory, Lincolnshire, England
- House: Aberffraw
- Father: Llywelyn ap Gruffudd
- Mother: Eleanor de Montfort

Gwenllian ferch Llywelyn (June 1282 – 7 June 1337; pronounced [ɡwenˈɬi.an]), commonly known as Gwenllian of Wales, was the daughter of Eleanor de Montfort and Llywelyn ap Gruffudd, the last native Prince of Wales (Welsh: Tywysog Cymru).

== Lineage ==
Gwenllian was born in the Gwynedd royal home in Abergwyngregyn near Bangor, Gwynedd. Gwenllian's mother, Eleanor de Montfort, died during childbirth, or shortly afterwards, on 19 June 1282. Gwenllian was descended from dual royal bloodlines: not only was she the daughter of the Prince of Gwynedd and heiress of the royal family of The House of Aberffraw, but her maternal great-grandfather was King John of England.

== Capture by King Edward I ==
A few months after Gwenllian's birth, northern Wales was encircled by the English army of King Edward I. On 11 December 1282, her father, Llywelyn ap Gruffudd, was killed in battle; the exact circumstances are unclear and there are conflicting accounts of his death. Gwenllian's uncle, Dafydd ap Gruffudd, assumed her guardianship, until 21 June 1283, when he was captured with his family at Nanhysglain, a secret hiding place in a bog by Bera Mawr in the uplands of northern Wales. Dafydd, severely injured, was taken to Rhuddlan then moved under guard to Shrewsbury, where he was later executed.

== Confinement ==
Gwenllian and the daughters of her uncle Dafydd ap Gruffudd were all confined for life in remote priories in Lincolnshire and never allowed freedom. Gwenllian was placed in the Gilbertine Priory at Sempringham, where she remained until her death 54 years later. In committing her to a convent, Edward's aim was partly to prevent her from becoming a focus for Welsh discontent, perhaps by marrying and having sons who might lay claim to the Principality of Wales. He chose Sempringham Priory in Lincolnshire. It has been speculated that the girls were taken to Lincolnshire from Gwynedd by sea.

Gwenllian's royal rank was acknowledged at least once by the English Crown. When writing to the Pope, attempting to secure more money for Sempringham Priory from the Church, the English king stated that "...herein is kept the Princess of Wales, whom we have to maintain". The title "Princess of Wales" as used here did not have its usual accepted meaning.

Having been taken from her native land so young, Gwenllian is unlikely to have remembered any Welsh she may have learned as a toddler, and perhaps never knew the correct pronunciation of her own name. The priory record-keepers listed her as "Wencilian" and was herself shown to have signed her name "Wentliane".

== Final years and death ==
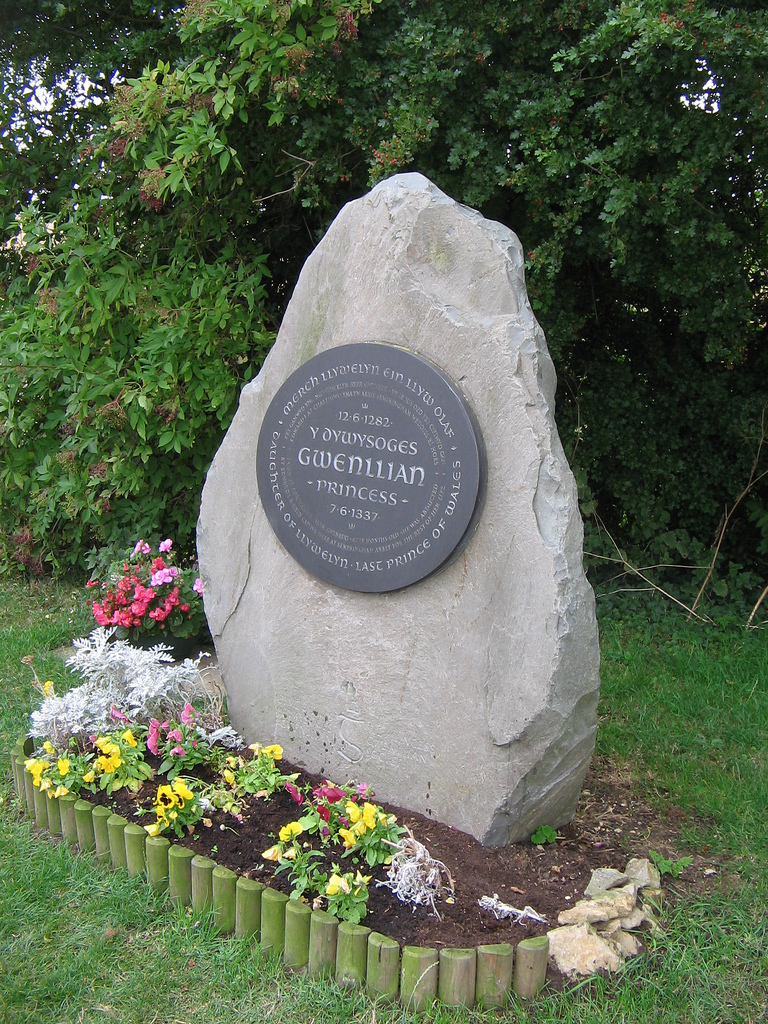
Memorial to Princess Gwenllian at Sempringham, England.

Edward III of England, Edward I's grandson, endowed Gwenllian with a pension of £20 per year; this was not money for her personally, simply a sum paid on her behalf to the priory in respect of her food and clothing. Her death there was recorded by the priory's chronicler in June 1337, a few days before her 55th birthday.

== Ancestry ==
Ancestors of Gwenllian of Wales

8. Llywelyn ab Iorwerth
4. Gruffudd ap Llywelyn ab Iorwerth
9. Tangwystl Goch
2. Llywelyn ap Gruffudd
10. Caradog ap Tomas
5. Senana ferch Caradog
11. Efa ferch Gwyn
1. Gwenllian ferch Llywelyn
12. Simon de Montfort, 5th Earl of Leicester
6. Simon de Montfort, 6th Earl of Leicester
13. Alix de Montmorency
3. Eleanor de Montfort
14. John, King of England
7. Eleanor of England
15. Isabella of Angoulême

== Gwenllian in later tradition ==
- A memorial made of Welsh granite was erected near Saint Andrew's Church, Sempringham, known to locals as Sempringham Abbey, in Lincolnshire. There is also a display about Gwenllian inside the church, although visitors must request the key to enter and view it.
- Gwenllian has been commemorated at least twice in poetry. "Gwenllian", by T. James Jones, was inspired by the site of her memorial stone."In Sempringham" is by Mererid Hopwood, the first woman to win the Bardic Chair at the National Eisteddfod, Wales' top honour for poetry.
- On 26 September 2009, Carnedd Uchaf, in the Carneddau mountain range in Snowdonia, was formally renamed Carnedd Gwenllian in her memory following a lengthy campaign by the Princess Gwenllian Society. The Ordnance Survey added the names Carnedd Uchaf / Carnedd Gwenllian on its maps published from 2010 onwards. The original name of Garnedd Uchaf, which is within the Bounds of Abergwyngregyn, is Garnedd Lladron.
- In 2008 a plaque was placed on the rock just below the summit of Snowdon commemorating "the Princess Gwenllian (1282-1337), only child of Prince Llewelyn ap Gruffudd, Lord of Snowdonia, Prince of Wales." This original plaque was stolen and found damaged in 2018, to be replaced with a near-identical one.

== Primary source references ==
- Calendar of Patent Rolls, 1281–92, 321 (Inquiry of 1289 concerning the custody of the Welsh royal children)
- Calendar of Papal Letters, ii, 185, 273
- Calendar of Memoranda Rolls, 1226–7, no. 2160
- Calendar of Close Rolls, 1327–30, 65, 175, 273, 322, 438
- Public Record Office, London E101/351/9 (Letter, noting provision made for the needs of the Welsh royal children, 11 November 1283)
- Calendar Ancient Petitions, 458 (letter from Gwenllian)
- Robert Manning (a canon at Sempringham then at Sixhills) see The Works of Thomas Hearne, 4 vols (London, 1810)
- Annales Prioratus de Dunstaplia, 293–4
- Accounts of Bristol Castle
