= Henry of Almain =

13th-century English nobleman

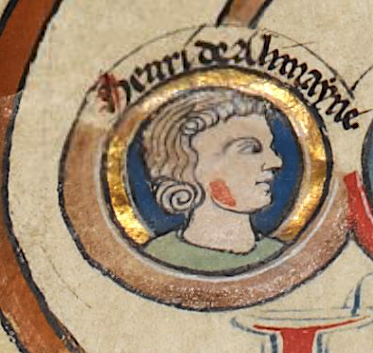
- Born: 2 November 1235; Hailes Abbey, Gloucestershire
- Died: 13 March 1271 (aged 35); Chiesa di San Silvestro, Viterbo, Italy
- Burial: Hailes Abbey, Gloucestershire
- Spouse: Constance of Béarn
- House: Plantagenet
- Father: Richard, 1st Earl of Cornwall
- Mother: Isabel Marshal

Henry of Almain (Anglo-Norman: Henri d'Almayne; 2 November 1235 – 13 March 1271), also called Henry of Cornwall, was the eldest son of Richard, Earl of Cornwall, afterwards King of the Romans, by his first wife Isabel Marshal. His surname is derived from a vowel shift in pronunciation of d'Allemagne ("of Germany"); he was so called by the elites of England because of his father's status as the elected German King of Almayne.

== Life ==
Henry was knighted by his father the day after Richard was crowned King of the Romans at Aachen, the usual coronation place for German kings. Richard's coronation took place on 17 May 1257.

As a nephew of both Henry III and Simon de Montfort, he wavered between the two at the beginning of the Barons' War, but finally took the royalist side and was among the hostages taken by Montfort after the Battle of Lewes (1264), was held at Wallingford Castle and later released.

In 1268 he took the cross with his cousin Edward, who, however, sent him back from Sicily to pacify the unruly province of Gascony. Henry took the land route with Philip III of France and Charles I of Sicily.

== Death ==
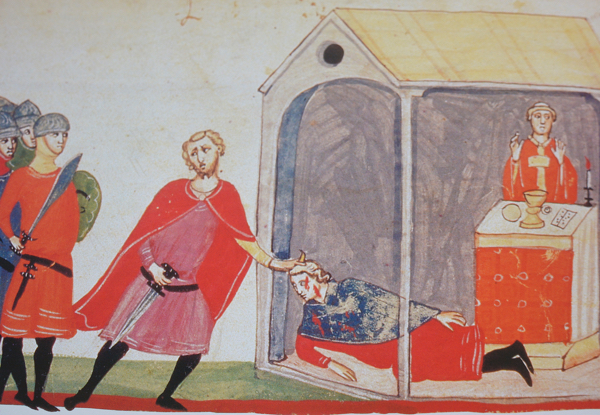
The murder of Henry by the de Montforts

While attending mass at the church of San Silvestro (also called the Chiesa del Gesù) in Viterbo on 13 March 1271, Henry was murdered by his cousins Guy and Simon de Montfort the Younger, sons of Simon de Montfort, 6th Earl of Leicester, in revenge for the beheading of their father and older brother at the Battle of Evesham. The deed is mentioned by Dante Alighieri, who took it upon himself to place Guy de Montfort in the seventh circle of hell in his masterpiece, The Divine Comedy, which was written at least 40 years after Henry's death. Henry was buried at Hailes Abbey in Gloucestershire.

== Marriage ==
Henry was married to Constance of Béarn (died 1299), eldest of four daughters of Gaston VII of Montcada, Viscount of Béarn, on 5 May 1269 at Windsor Castle. No children came of this union, and thus his half-brother, Edmund, became the heir apparent of their father.
