= Guy de Montfort, Count of Nola =

English soldier

Guy de Montfort
- Count of Nola
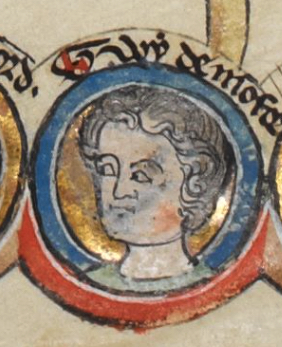
- Born: 1244
- Died: 1291 (aged 46–47)
- Noble family: Montfort
- Spouse: Margherita Aldobrandeschi
- Issue: Anastasia de Montfort; Tomasina
- Father: Simon de Montfort, 6th Earl of Leicester
- Mother: Eleanor of England

Guy de Montfort, Count of Nola (1244–1291) was the son of Simon de Montfort, 6th Earl of Leicester who joined his father at the battle of Evesham in 1265. He was captured and wounded while his father and older brother both died in the battle. Imprisoned until 1266 when he bribed his guards, Guy wandered throughout Europe. As Vicar-General of Charles of Anjou, he distinguished himself at the battle of Tagliacozzo. In 1271, Guy, along with his younger brother Simon, murdered Henry Alain, which resulted in the excommunication of both men. After losing his titles, he worked for Charles of Anjou until his capture in 1287 at the Battle of the Counts. He died in prison.

== Biography ==
Guy was the son of Simon de Montfort, 6th Earl of Leicester and Eleanor of England. He participated in the Battle of Evesham in August 1265 against the royalist forces of his uncle, King Henry III of England, and his cousin, Prince Edward. Both his father and elder brother Henry were killed during the disastrous battle. Guy de Montfort was seriously wounded and captured.

He was held at Windsor Castle until spring 1266, when he bribed his captors and escaped to France to rejoin his exiled family. Guy and his brother, Simon the Younger, wandered across Europe for several years, eventually making their way to Italy.

Guy took service with Charles of Anjou, serving as his Vicar-General in Tuscany. He distinguished himself at the Battle of Tagliacozzo and was given Nola by Charles.

In 1271, Guy and Simon discovered that their cousin Henry of Almain (son of Richard, Earl of Cornwall and nephew of King Henry III) was attending mass at the church of San Silvestro, Viterbo. In revenge for the deaths of their father and brother at Evesham, on 13 March 1271, Guy and Simon murdered Henry while he clutched the altar, begging for mercy. "You had no mercy for my father and brothers", was Guy's reply. This murder was carried out in the presence of cardinals, who at the time were conducting a papal conclave; of King Philip III of France; and of King Charles of Sicily. For this crime the Montfort brothers were excommunicated.

The news reached England, and King Henry III dispatched a clerk of the royal household to inform the northern counties and Scotland about the excommunication. Pope Gregory X wrote a letter (29 November 1273) to King Edward from Lyons, where he was preparing for an ecumenical council, that Cardinal Riccardo Annibaldi and Cardinal Giovanni Orsini were still in Rome and had been ordered to find a secure place of imprisonment in the territories of the Church for Guy de Montfort.

Simon died later that year at Siena, "cursed by God, a wanderer and a fugitive". Guy was stripped of his titles and took service with Charles of Anjou again, but was captured off the coast of Sicily in 1287 by the Aragonese at the Battle of the Counts. He died in a Sicilian prison in 1291.

== Family ==
In Tuscany, Guy married an Italian noblewoman, Margherita Aldobrandeschi, the Lady of Sovana. With her he had two daughters: Anastasia, who married Romano Orsini, and Tomasina, who married Pietro di Vico.

== Cultural Reference ==
Dante banished Guy to the river of boiling blood in the seventh circle of his Inferno (Canto XII).

== Sources ==
- Baldwin, David (2010). Elizabeth Woodville: Mother of the Princes in the Tower. The History Press. ISBN 0750938862.
- Carpenter, David (2023). Henry III: Reform, Rebellion, Civil War, Settlement, 1258-1272. Yale University Press. ISBN 9780300248050.
- Maddicott, J. R. (1996). Simon de Montfort. Cambridge University Press. ISBN 9780521376365.
- Norgate, Kate (1894). "Montfort, Guy of" . In Lee, Sidney (ed.). Dictionary of National Biography. Vol. 38. London: Smith, Elder & Co.
- Prestwich, Michael (2008). Edward I. Yale University Press. ISBN 9780300146653.
