= Simon de Montfort, 6th Earl of Leicester =

English nobleman and rebel (c.1208 – 1265)

Simon de Montfort
- 6th Earl of Leicester
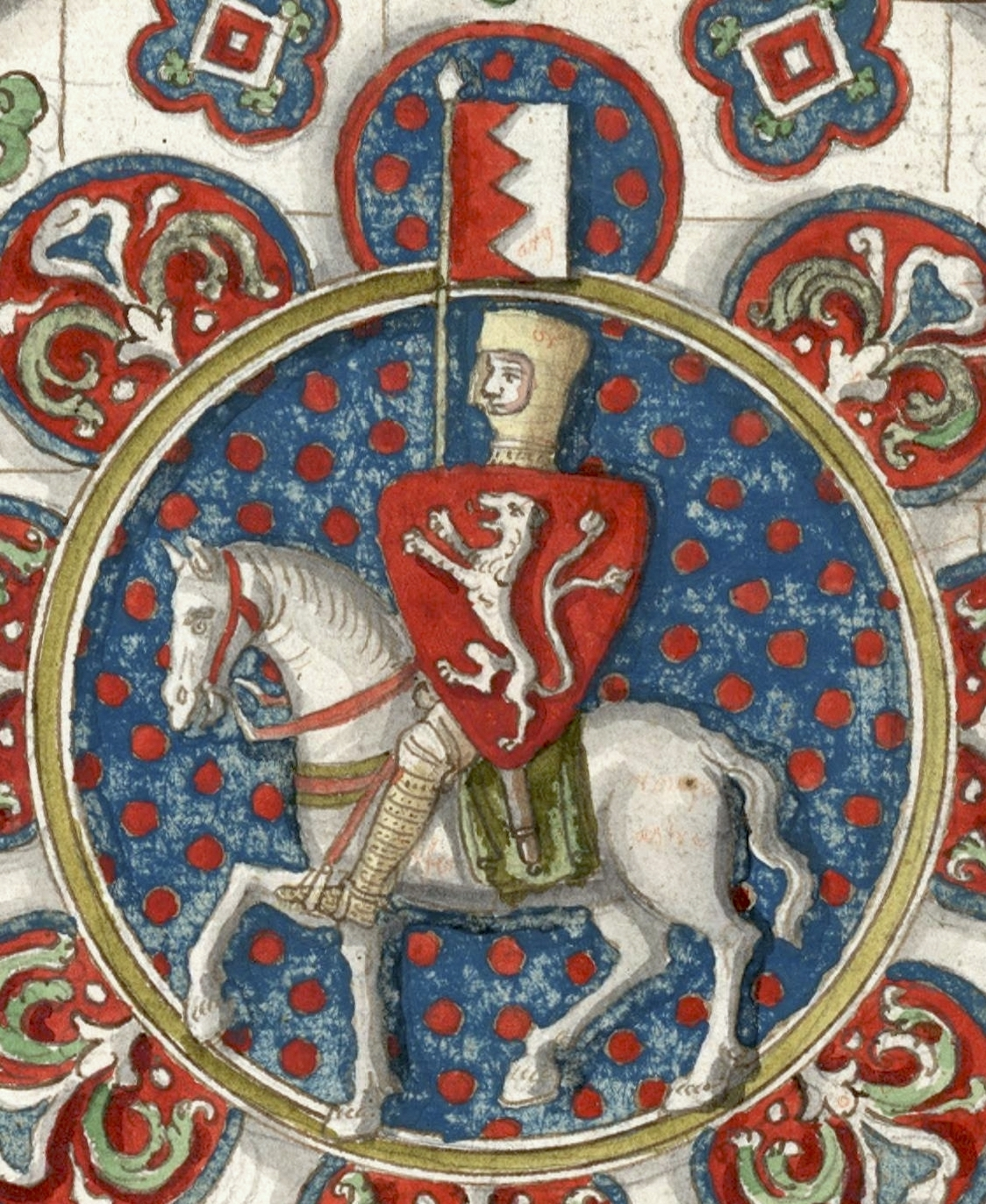
- Simon de Montfort, in a drawing of a stained glass window found at Chartres Cathedral, c. 1250

Earl of Leicester
- Tenure: 1239 – 4 August 1265
- Predecessor: Simon de Montfort, 5th Earl
- Successor: None, title forfeit
- Born: c. 1208; Montfort-l'Amaury, France
- Died: 4 August 1265 (aged about 57); Evesham, Worcestershire, England
- Buried: Evesham Abbey
- Wars and battles: Barons' Crusade; Second Barons' War; Battle of Northampton; Battle of Lewes; Battle of Evesham †
- Noble family: Montfort
- Spouse: Eleanor of England
- Issue Detail: Henry de Montfort; Simon de Montfort the Younger; Amaury de Montfort; Guy de Montfort, Count of Nola; Joanna de Montfort; Richard de Montfort; Eleanor, Princess of Wales
- Father: Simon de Montfort, 5th Earl of Leicester
- Mother: Alix de Montmorency
- Occupation: Soldier and statesman

Simon de Montfort, 6th Earl of Leicester, 1st Earl of Chester (c. 1208 – 4 August 1265), also known as Simon V (Note: Montfort's father (Simon de Montfort, 5th Earl of Leicester) is also sometimes known as Simon V. The discrepancy in numbering arises from confusion between Simon III de Montfort (died 1181) and his son Simon de Montfort (died 1188). The latter was historically unknown, and Simon III was believed to be the father (not the grandfather) of the 5th Earl, who is therefore known as Simon IV in some sources. and Simon V in others.) de Montfort, was an English nobleman of French origin and a member of the English peerage, who led the baronial opposition to the rule of King Henry III, culminating in the Second Barons' War. Following his initial victories over royal forces, he became de facto ruler of England, and played a major role in the constitutional development of England.

During his rule, Montfort called two famous parliaments: the Oxford Parliament stripped Henry of his unlimited authority, while the second included ordinary citizens from the towns. For this reason, Montfort is regarded today as one of the progenitors of modern parliamentary democracy. As Earl of Leicester he expelled Jews from that city; as he became ruler of England he also cancelled debts owed to Jews through violent seizures of records. Montfort's party massacred the Jews of London, Worcester and Derby, killing scores of Jews from Winchester to Lincoln. After a rule of just over a year, Montfort was killed by forces loyal to the king in the Battle of Evesham.

== Family ==
Montfort was a younger son of Alix de Montmorency and Simon de Montfort, 5th Earl of Leicester, a French nobleman and leader of a crusade against the Cathars in south-west France. His paternal grandmother was Amicia de Beaumont, the senior co-heiress to the Earldom of Leicester and a large estate owned by her brother Robert de Beaumont, 4th Earl of Leicester, in England.

With the irrevocable loss of Normandy, King John refused to allow the elder Simon to succeed to the earldom of Leicester and instead placed the estates and title into the hands of Montfort senior's cousin Ranulf, the Earl of Chester. The elder Simon had also acquired vast domains during the Albigensian Crusade, but was killed during the Siege of Toulouse in 1218 and his eldest son Amaury was not able to retain them. When Amaury was rebuffed in his attempt to get the earldom back, he agreed to allow his younger brother Simon to claim it in return for all family possessions in France.

Simon arrived in England in 1229, with some education but no knowledge of English, and received a sympathetic hearing from King Henry III, who became well disposed towards foreigners speaking French, then the language of the English court. Henry did not oppose Simon's claim, so Simon approached the older, childless man himself and his claim was subsequently recognised. It would take another nine years before Henry formally invested him with the title Earl of Leicester.

== Life ==
=== Early life ===
As a younger son, Simon de Montfort attracted little public attention during his youth, and the date of his birth remains unknown. He is first mentioned when his mother made a grant to him in 1217. As a boy, Montfort accompanied his parents during his father's campaigns against the Cathars. He was with his mother at the Siege of Toulouse in 1218, where his father died after being struck on the head by a stone pitched by a mangonel. In addition to Amaury, Simon had another older brother, Guy, who was killed at the siege of Castelnaudary in 1220. As a young man, Montfort probably took part in the Albigensian Crusades of the early 1220s. He and Amaury both took part in the Barons' Crusade.

In 1229 the two surviving brothers (Amaury and Simon) came to an arrangement with King Henry whereby Simon gave up his rights in France and Amaury gave up his rights in England. Thus freed from any allegiance to the king of France, Montfort successfully petitioned for the English inheritance, which he received the next year, although he did not take full possession for several years, and did not win formal recognition as Earl of Leicester until February 1239. Montfort became a favourite of King Henry III and even issued a charter as "Earl of Leicester" in 1236, despite having not yet been granted the title.

In that same year, Simon tried to persuade Joan, Countess of Flanders to marry him. The idea of an alliance between the rich County of Flanders and a close associate of Henry III of England did not sit well with the French crown. The French Queen Dowager Blanche of Castile convinced Joan to marry Thomas II of Savoy instead, who himself became Count of Flanders.

=== Royal marriage ===
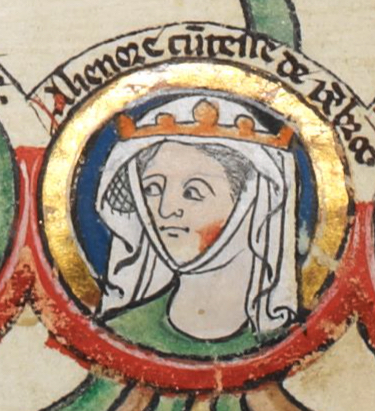
Eleanor of England, who married Montfort in 1238, depicted in the early-fourteenth-century Genealogical Roll of the Kings of England

In January 1238, Montfort married Eleanor of England, daughter of King John and Isabella of Angoulême and sister of King Henry III. While this marriage took place with the king's approval, the act itself was performed secretly and without consulting the great barons, as a marriage of such importance warranted. Eleanor had previously been married to William Marshal, 2nd Earl of Pembroke, and she had sworn a vow of perpetual chastity upon his death, when she was sixteen, which she broke by marrying Montfort.

The archbishop of Canterbury, Edmund Rich, condemned the marriage for this reason. The English nobles protested against the marriage of the king's sister to a foreigner of modest rank. Most notably, the king's and Eleanor's brother Richard, 1st Earl of Cornwall, rose up in revolt when he learned of the marriage. King Henry eventually bought off Richard with 6,000 marks and peace was restored.

The marriage brought the manor of Sutton Valence in Kent into Montfort's possession.

Relations between King Henry and Montfort were cordial at first. Henry lent him his support when Montfort embarked for Rome in March 1238 to seek papal approval for his marriage. When Simon and Eleanor's first son was born in November 1238 (despite rumours, more than nine months after the wedding), he was baptised Henry in honour of his royal uncle. In February 1239, Montfort was finally invested with the Earldom of Leicester. He also acted as the king's counsellor and was one of the nine godfathers of Henry's eldest son, Edward Longshanks.

=== Expulsion of Jews from Leicester ===
As Earl of Leicester, Montfort expelled the small Jewish community from Leicester city in 1231, banishing them "in my time or in the time of any of my heirs to the end of the world". He justified his action as being "for the good of my soul, and for the souls of my ancestors and successors". Expelling the Jews enhanced Montfort's popularity in his new domains as it cancelled many of the debt owed by many minor landowners. Leicester's Jews were allowed to move to the eastern suburbs, which were controlled by Montfort's great-aunt Margaret, Countess of Winchester, until 1253 when the Statute of Jewry once again uprooted them.

His parents had shown a similar hostility to Jews in France, where his father had taken part in the Albigensian Crusade, during which his mother had given the Jews of Toulouse a choice of conversion, expulsion or death. Robert Grosseteste – then Archdeacon of Leicester and, according to Matthew Paris, de Montfort's confessor – may have encouraged the expulsion, though he is known to have argued that Jews' lives should be spared.

=== Crusade and turning against the king ===
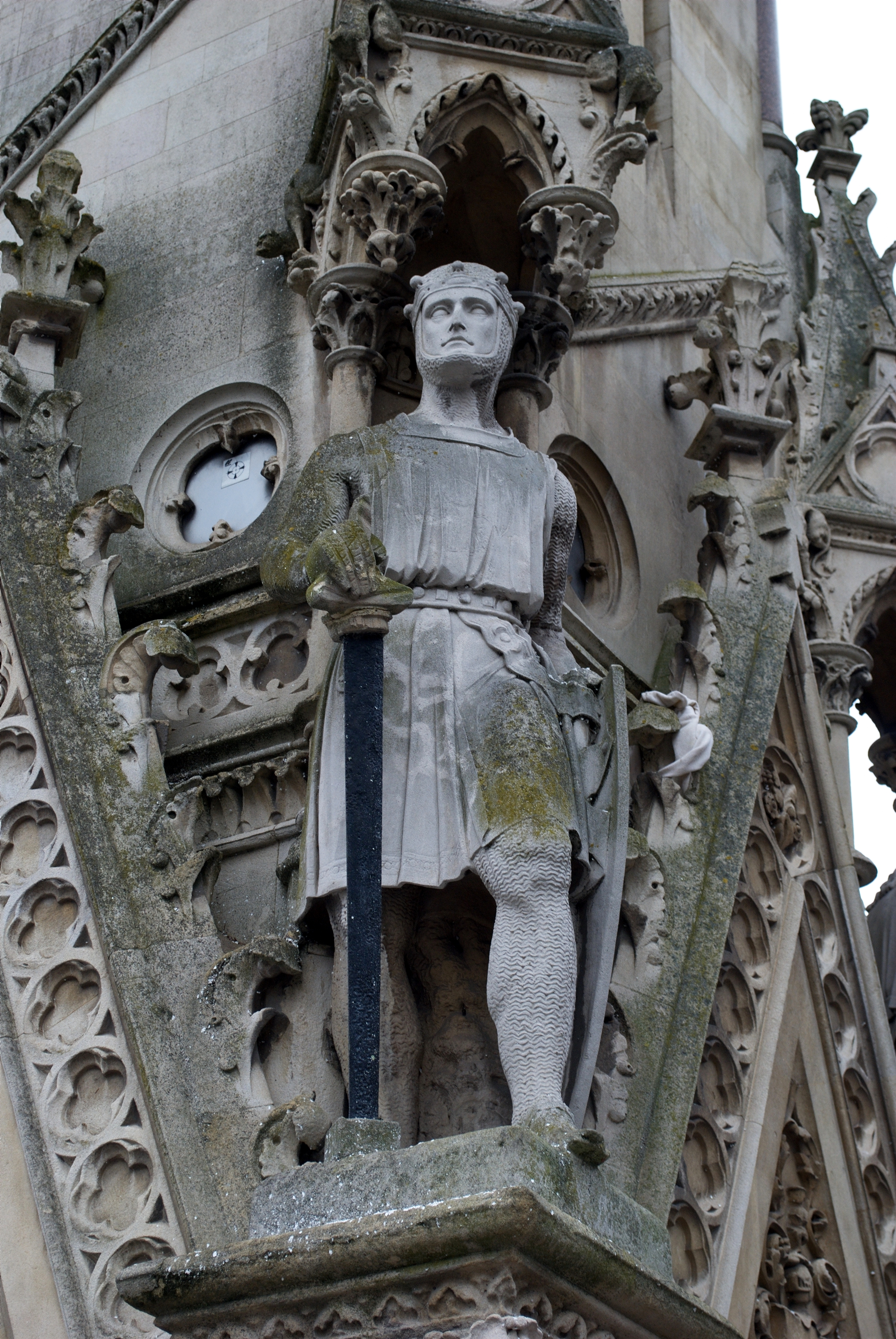
Statue of Montfort on the Haymarket Memorial Clock Tower in Leicester

Shortly after Prince Edward's birth in 1239, Montfort fell out with his brother-in-law, Henry III. Montfort owed a great sum of money to Thomas, Count of Flanders, Queen Eleanor's uncle, and named King Henry as security for his repayment. The king evidently had not approved this, and was enraged when he discovered that Montfort had used his name. On 9 August 1239, he confronted Montfort, called him an excommunicant and threatened to imprison him in the Tower of London. Matthew Paris reported that Henry said "You seduced my sister and when I discovered this, I gave her to you, against my will, to avoid scandal." Simon and Eleanor fled to France to escape Henry's wrath.

Having announced his intention to go on crusade two years before, Simon raised funds and travelled to the Holy Land during the Barons' Crusade, but does not seem to have faced combat there. He was part of the crusading host which, under Richard of Cornwall, negotiated the release of Christian prisoners including Simon's older brother, Amaury. In autumn 1241, he left Syria and joined King Henry's campaign against King Louis IX in Poitou in July 1242. The campaign was a failure, and an exasperated Montfort declared that Henry should be locked up like King Charles the Simple. Like his father, Simon was a soldier as well as a capable administrator. His dispute with King Henry came about due to the latter's determination to ignore the swelling discontent within the country, caused by a combination of factors, including famine and a sense, among the English Barons, that King Henry was too quick to dispense favour to his Poitevin relatives and Savoyard in-laws.

In 1248, Montfort again took the cross with the idea of following Louis IX of France to Egypt. However, at the repeated requests of King Henry, he gave up this project in order to act as the king's Lieutenant of the Duchy of Aquitaine (Gascony). Bitter complaints were excited by the rigour with which Montfort suppressed the excesses of the Seigneurs and of contending factions in the great communes. Henry yielded to the outcry and instituted a formal inquiry into Simon's administration. Simon was formally acquitted on the charges of oppression, but his accounts were disputed by Henry, and Simon retired to France in 1252. The nobles of France offered him the Regency of the kingdom, vacated by the death of Queen Blanche of Castile. The earl preferred to make his peace with Henry III, which he did in 1253, in obedience to the exhortations of the dying Robert Grosseteste, Bishop of Lincoln. He helped the king deal with disaffection in Gascony, but their reconciliation was a hollow one. In the Parliament of 1254, Simon led the opposition in resisting a royal demand for a subsidy. In 1256–57, when the discontent of all classes was coming to a head, Montfort nominally adhered to the royal cause. He undertook, with Peter of Savoy, the Queen's uncle, the difficult task of extricating the king from the pledges which he had given to the Pope with reference to the Crown of Sicily; and Henry's writs of this date mention Montfort in friendly terms. However, at the "Mad Parliament" of Oxford (1258) Montfort appeared with the Earl of Gloucester, at the head of the opposition. He was part of the Council of Fifteen who were to constitute the supreme board of control over the administration. The king's success in dividing the barons and in fostering a reaction, however, rendered such projects hopeless. In 1261, Henry revoked his assent to the Provisions of Oxford and Montfort, in despair, left the country.

=== War against the king ===
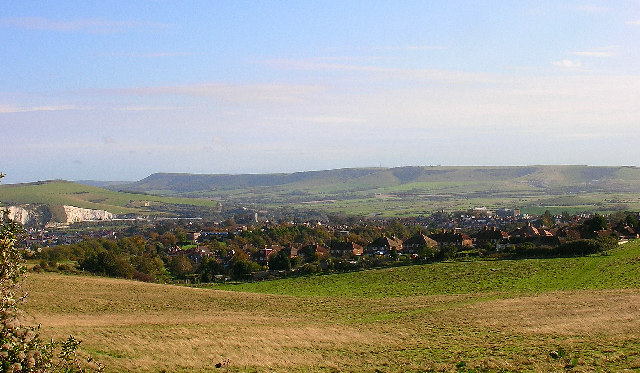
Site of the Battle of Lewes (1264) in East Sussex, photographed in 2005

Simon de Montfort returned to England in 1263, at the invitation of the barons who were now convinced of the king's hostility to all reform, and raised a rebellion with the avowed object of restoring the form of government which the Provisions had ordained. Cancellation of debts (owed to Jews) was part of his call to arms.

At the time, the King was periodically raising punitive taxation on the Jews, causing them to sell their debt bonds cheaply to raise cash to pay their taxes. The bonds were sold to the richest courtiers at cut down prices, leading many indebted middling landowners to lose their lands. This fed into rising anti-Semitic beliefs, fuelled by the church. Measures against the Jews and controls over debts and usury dominated debates about royal power and finances among the classes that were beginning to be involved in Parliament.

The debt "cancellations" however involved massacres of Jews by his followers, to obtain their financial records, for instance in Worcester and London. The Worcester attack and killings were led by de Montfort's son Henry, and Robert Earl Ferrers. In London, one of his key followers John FitzJohn led the attack, and is said to have killed leading Jewish figures Isaac fil Aaron and Cok fil Abraham with his bare hands. He allegedly shared the loot with Montfort. Five hundred Jews died.

His son Simon led a further attack on Jews in Winchester. Jews in Canterbury were murdered or driven out by a force led by Gilbert de Clare. De Montfort's followers massacred most of the Jews who lived in Derby in February 1262. There was further violence in Lincoln, Cambridge, Wilton and Northampton.

Each attack was aimed at the seizure of the records of debts, stored in locked chests within each community, called 'archae'. Archae were legally mandated by the king for Jews to be allowed to conduct any business. They were destroyed or gathered for instance at Ely by the rebels.

Henry quickly gave in and allowed Montfort to take control of the council. His son Edward, however, began using patronage and bribes to win over many of the barons. Their disruption of parliament in October led to a renewal of hostilities, which saw the royalists able to trap Simon in London. With few other options available, Montfort agreed to allow Louis IX of France to arbitrate their dispute. Simon was prevented from presenting his case to Louis directly on account of a broken leg, but few suspected that the king of France, known for his innate sense of justice, would completely annul the Provisions in his Mise of Amiens in January 1264. Civil war broke out almost immediately, with the royalists again able to confine the reformist army in London. In early May 1264, Simon marched out to give battle to the king and scored a spectacular triumph at the Battle of Lewes on 14 May 1264, capturing the king, together with Prince Edward and Richard of Cornwall, Henry's brother and the titular King of Germany.

Montfort announced after the Battle of Lewes that all debts owed to the Jews were cancelled, as he had promised.

=== Rule and parliamentary reform ===
Montfort used his victory to set up a government based on the provisions first established at Oxford in 1258. Henry retained the title and authority of King, but all decisions and approval now rested with his council, led by Montfort and subject to consultation with parliament. His Great Parliament of 1265 (Montfort's Parliament) was a packed assembly to be sure, but it can hardly be supposed that the representation which he granted to the towns was intended to be a temporary expedient.

Montfort sent his summons, in the king's name, to each county and to a select list of boroughs, asking each to send two representatives. This body was not the first elected parliament in England. In 1254, Henry was in Gascony and in need of money. He gave instructions for his regent, Queen Eleanor, to summon a parliament consisting of knights elected by their shires to ask for this 'aid'. Montfort, who was in that parliament, took the innovation further by including ordinary citizens from the boroughs, also elected, and it was from this period that parliamentary representation derives. The list of boroughs which had the right to elect a member grew slowly over the centuries as monarchs granted charters to more English towns. (The last charter was given to Newark in 1674.)

The right to vote in Parliamentary elections for county constituencies was uniform throughout the country, related to land ownership. In the Boroughs, the electoral franchise varied and individual boroughs had varying arrangements.

=== Fall from power and death ===
The reaction against Montfort's government was baronial rather than popular. The Welsh marcher lords were friends and allies of Prince Edward, and when he escaped in May 1265, they rallied around his opposition. The final nail was the defection of Gilbert de Clare, the Earl of Gloucester, the most powerful baron and Simon's ally at Lewes. Clare had grown resentful of Simon's fame and growing power. When he and his brother Thomas fell out with Simon's sons Henry, Simon the Younger, and Guy, they deserted the reforming cause and joined Edward.

Though boosted by Welsh infantry sent by Montfort's ally Llywelyn ap Gruffudd, Simon's forces were severely depleted. Prince Edward attacked his cousin, his godfather's son Simon's forces at Kenilworth, capturing more of Montfort's allies. Montfort himself had crossed the Severn with his army, intending to rendezvous with his son Simon the Younger. When he saw an army approaching Evesham, Montfort initially thought it was his son's forces. It was, however, Edward's army flying the Montfort banners they had captured at Kenilworth. At that point, Simon realised he had been out-manoeuvred by Edward.

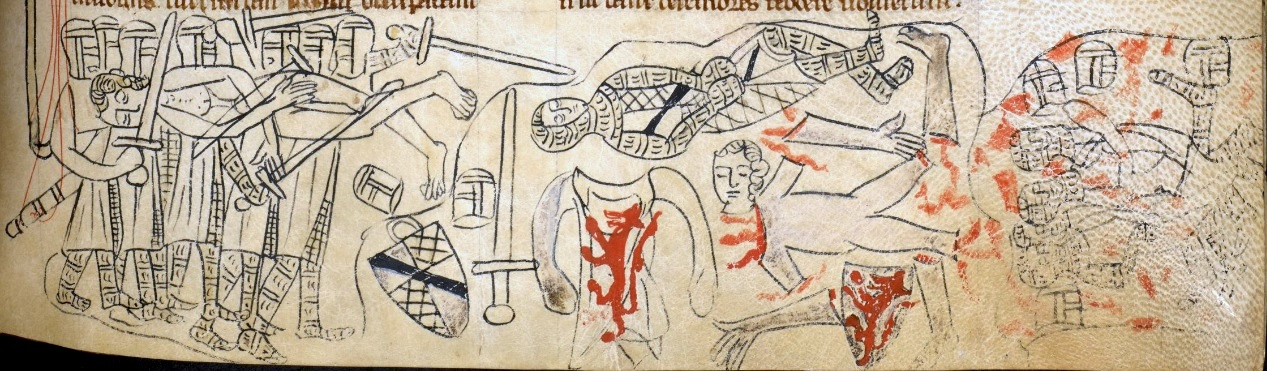
A 13th-century depiction on parchment of the mutilation of Montfort's body after the Battle of Evesham in Worcestershire in 1265

An ominous black cloud hung over the field of Evesham on 4 August 1265 as Montfort led his army in a desperate uphill charge against superior forces, described by one chronicler as the "murder of Evesham, for battle it was none". On hearing that his son Henry had been killed, Montfort replied, "Then it is time to die." Before the battle, Prince Edward had appointed a twelve-man death squad to stalk the battlefield, their sole aim being to find the earl and cut him down. Montfort was hemmed in; Roger Mortimer killed Montfort by stabbing him in the neck with a lance. Montfort's last words were said to have been "Thank God". Also slain with Montfort were other leaders of his movement, including Peter de Montfort and Hugh Despenser.

Montfort's body was mutilated in a frenzy by the royalists. News reached the mayor and sheriffs of London that "the head of the earl of Leicester ... was severed from his body, and his testicles cut off and hung on either side of his nose"; and in such guise the head was sent to Wigmore Castle by Mortimer as a gift to his own wife, Maud. His hands and feet were also cut off and sent to diverse places to enemies of his as a great mark of dishonour to the deceased. Such remains as could be found were buried before the altar of Evesham Abbey church by the canons. The grave was visited as holy ground by many commoners until King Henry caught wind of it. He declared that Montfort deserved no spot on holy ground, and had his remains reburied in another "secret" location, probably in the crypt. The remains of some of Montfort's soldiers who had fled the battlefield were found in the nearby village of Cleeve Prior.

Montfort's niece, Margaret of England, later killed one of the soldiers responsible for his death, purposely or inadvertently.

Matthew Paris reports that the Bishop of Lincoln, Robert Grosseteste, once said to Montfort's eldest son, Henry, "My beloved child, both you and your father will meet your deaths on one day, and by one kind of death, but it will be in the name of justice and truth."

== Legacy ==
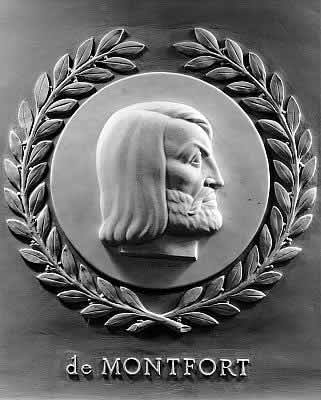
Relief of Simon de Montfort in the Chamber of the United States House of Representatives

Following Montfort's death, he became the focus of an unofficial popular miracle cult, centred on his grave in Evesham Abbey. It was practised in secret for at least two years because of an official ban, but lasted until c.1280, with pilgrims continuing to visit his grave for some years thereafter. The so-called Evesham "miracle book" documents some 200 alleged miracles associated with his name.

Napoleon Bonaparte described Simon de Montfort as "one of the greatest Englishmen". Today, Montfort is principally remembered as one of the fathers of representative government.

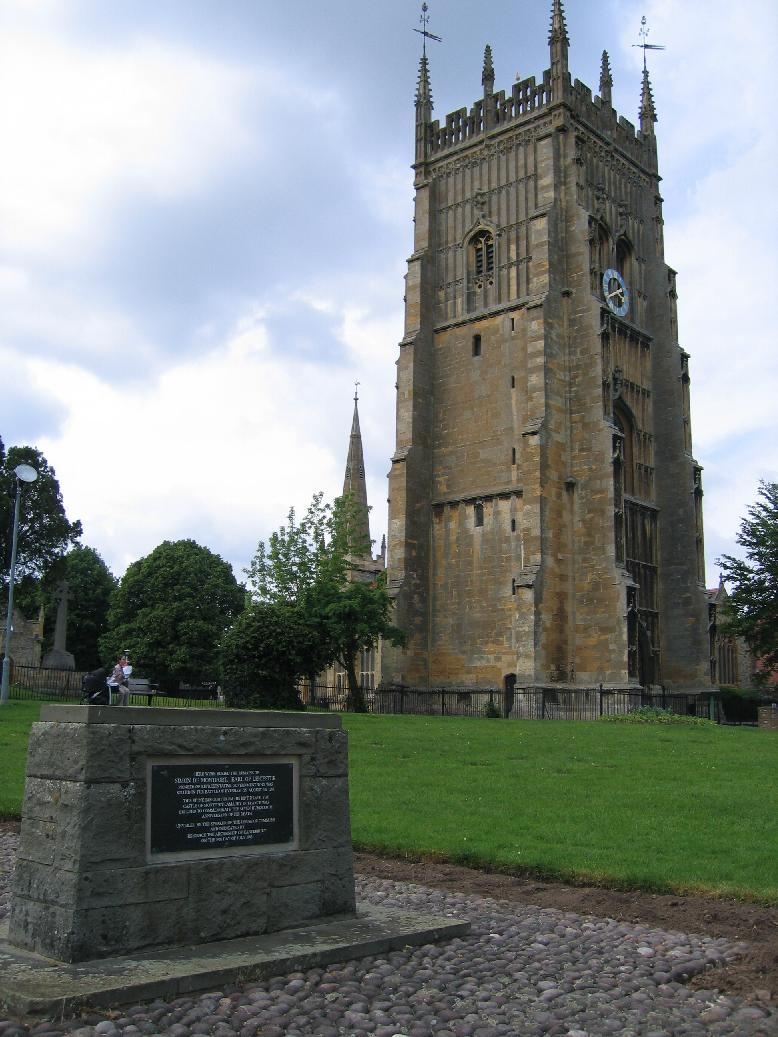
Memorial stone, erected in 1965, on the site of de Montfort's grave at Evesham Abbey in Worcestershire

Montfort bears responsibility for persecution of Jews. In addition to his expulsion of Jews from Leicester, his faction in the Second Baron's War initiated pogroms killing perhaps the majority of Jews in Derby and Worcester and around 500 in London. The violence and killings unleashed by the war targeting Jews carried on after his death. Jews were living in such terror that King Henry appointed burgesses and citizens of certain towns to protect and defend them because "they fear[ed] grave peril" and were in a "deplorable state." Leicester City Council made a formal statement in 2001 that "rebuked De Montfort for his blatant anti-Semitism".

Evesham Abbey and the site of Montfort's grave were destroyed with the Dissolution of the Monasteries in the 16th century. In 1965, a memorial of stone from Montfort-l'Amaury was laid on the site of the former altar by Speaker of the House of Commons Sir Harry Hylton-Foster and Archbishop of Canterbury, Michael Ramsey.

Various local honours were dedicated to his memory, and he has become eponymous several times over. De Montfort University in Leicester is named after him, as is the nearby De Montfort Hall, a concert venue. A statue of Montfort is one of four to adorn the Haymarket Memorial Clock Tower in Leicester. A relief of Montfort adorns the wall of the Chamber of the United States House of Representatives.

Montfort's banner, known as the "Arms of Honour of Hinckley", blazoned Party per pale indented argent and gules, and displayed in stained glass in Chartres Cathedral, is used in the coat of arms of the town of Hinckley, part of his earldom in Leicestershire, and by many of its local organisations. Combined with his personal coat of arms, the banner forms part of the club crest for the town's football club Hinckley A.F.C.

A school and a bridge on the north-east stretch of the A46 in Evesham are named after him.

== Descendants ==
Arms of Simon de Montfort: Gules a lion rampant queue fourche argent.

Simon de Montfort and Eleanor of England had seven children, many of whom were notable in their own right:

1. Henry de Montfort (November 1238 – 1265)
2. Simon de Montfort the Younger (April 1240 – 1271)
3. Amaury de Montfort (1242/3–1300)
4. Guy de Montfort, Count of Nola (1244–1288)
5. Joanna de Montfort (born and died in Bordeaux between 1248 and 1251).
6. Richard de Montfort (d.1266). Date of death is not certain.
7. Eleanor de Montfort (1252–1282). She married Llywelyn ap Gruffudd, Prince of Wales, honouring an agreement that had been made between Earl Simon and Llywelyn. Eleanor, Lady of Wales, died on 19 June 1282 at the royal Welsh home at Abergwyngregyn, on the north coast of Gwynedd, giving birth to a daughter, Gwenllian of Wales. After Llywelyn's death on 11 December 1282, Gwenllian was captured by King Edward I and spent the rest of her life in a convent.

== See also ==
- The Song of Lewes

== Bibliography ==
- Ambler, Sophie Therese, The Song of Simon de Montfort: The Life and Death of a Medieval Revolutionary (London: Oxford University Press, 2019).
- BBC (19 January 2015). "Simon de Montfort: The turning point for democracy that gets overlooked". BBC.
- Blaauw, William Henry (1871). The Barons War: Including the Battles of Lewes and Evesham (2nd ed.). Baxter and Son.
- Brand, Paul (2003). Kings, Barons and Justices, The Making and Enforcement of Legislation in Thirteenth Century England. Cambridge: Cambridge University Press.
- Church, Stephen (2019). Henry III. Penguin Monarchs. London: Penguin Books.
- Cokayne, G. E. (1929). The Complete Peerage. Vol. 7 (2nd ed.). London: St Catherine Press. p. 716.
- Cox, David (2018). "The tomb of Simon de Montfort: an enquiry". Transactions of the Worcestershire Archaeological Society. 3rd series. 26: 159–71.
- Cox, David, ed. (2024). Saint Simon de Montfort: the miracles, laments, prayers and hymns. Martlesham: Boydell & Brewer. ISBN 9781837650842.
- Delany, Sheila, ed. (2002), Chaucer and the Jews, Routledge, ISBN 978-0-415-93882-2, OL 7496826M
- Frame, Robin, The Political Development of the British Isles, 1100–1400 (Oxford: Oxford University Press, 1990).
- Friedlander, Albert (2011). "Is Forgiveness Possible? A Jewish Perspective". BBC History. "Almost 800 years after his death, Leicester City Council formally rebuked Simon de Montfort for his blatant anti-Semitism"
- Graetz, Heinrich Hirsch (1891), History of the Jews., Philadelphia: Jewish Publication Society of America, LCCN 04022901, OCLC 890591, OL 6944479M
- Harris, Oliver (2008). "Jews, jurats and the Jewry Wall: a name in context" (PDF). Transactions of the Leicestershire Archaeological and Historical Society. 82: 129–31. doi:10.5284/1107879.
- Barbara Harvey ed, The Twelfth and Thirteenth Centuries: Short Oxford History of the British Isles (Oxford: Oxford University Press, 2001).
- Hinckley Independent (22 February 2014). "Hinckley Independent Club Crest History". Hinckley Independent.
- Hillaby, Joe; Hillaby, Caroline (2013). The Palgrave Dictionary of Medieval Anglo-Jewish History. Basingstoke: Palgrave Macmillan. ISBN 978-0-230-27816-5.; especially "Leicester", pp. 196–199 and "Montfort, Simon de (1208–65) and the English Jewry", pp. 273–275
- Jacobs, Joseph (1906). "England". Jewish Encyclopedia. JewishEncyclopedia.com.
- Jobson, Adrian (2012). The First English Revolution: Simon de Montfort, Henry III and the Barons' War. Bloomsbury. ISBN 978-1-84725-226-5.
- Jones, Dan (2014). The Plantagenets: The Warrior Kings and Queens Who Made England. New York: Penguin Books. ISBN 978-0-14-312492-4. OCLC 852238325.
- Jones, Dan, The Plantagenets: The Kings Who Made England (London: William Collins, 2013).
- Levy, S (1902). "Notes on Leicester Jewry". Transactions. 5. Jewish Historical Society of England: 34–42. JSTOR 29777626.
- Lippiatt, G. E. M. (2017). Simon V of Montfort and Baronial Government, 1195–1218. Oxford University Press. ISBN 978-0-19-880513-7.
- Maddicott, John Robert (1994). Simon de Montfort. Cambridge University Press. ISBN 0-521-37493-6.
- Huscroft, Richard (2006), Expulsion: England's Jewish Solution, Tempus Publishing, Limited, ISBN 978-0-7524-3729-3, OL 7982808M
- Mundill, Robin R. (2002), England's Jewish Solution, Cambridge, United Kingdom: Cambridge University Press, ISBN 978-0-521-52026-3, OL 26454030M
- Mundill, Robin R. (2010), The King's Jews, London: Continuum, ISBN 978-1-84725-186-2, LCCN 2010282921, OCLC 466343661, OL 24816680M
- Powicke, Maurice, The Thirteenth Century, 1217–1307 (Oxford: Oxford University Press, 1991).
- Prestwich, Michael., English Politics in the Thirteenth Century (Houndsmills: Macmillan, 1990).
- de Montfort School. "The de Montfort School, Evesham". de Montfort School.
- Phillips, Charles. "Battle of Toulouse". Encyclopædia Britannica Online.
- Norgate, K. (1894). "Montfort, Simon of, Earl of Leicester (1208?–1265)" . In Lee, Sidney (ed.). Dictionary of National Biography. Vol. 38. London: Smith, Elder & Co.
- Richmond, Colin (1992). "Englishness and Medieval Anglo-Jewry". In Kushner, Tony (ed.). The Jewish Heritage in British History. Frank Cass. pp. 42–59. ISBN 0714634646. OL 1710943M.
- Sharma, Simon (2000). A History of Britain. p. 184. ISBN 0-563-38497-2.
- Southern, R. W. (1992). Robert Grosseteste: the growth of an English mind in medieval Europe (2nd ed.). Oxford: Oxford University Press. ISBN 978-0-19-820310-0.
- Wilson, David. "The history of Sutton Valence and its buildings, History's hand on Sutton Valence". Sutton Valence Parish Council. Archived from the original on 13 March 2010.
- Tolan, John (2023). England's Jews: Finance, Violence, and the Crown in the Thirteenth Century. Philadelphia: University of Pennsylvania Press. ISBN 978-1512823899. OL 39646815M.
- Treharne, RF, E.B. Fryde ed, Simon de Montfort and Baronial Reform: Thirteenth-Century Essays (London: Hambledon Press, 1986).
- Wasserstein, D. J. (1995). "Grosseteste, the Jews and medieval Christian Hebraism". In McEvoy, James (ed.). Robert Grosseteste: new perspectives on his thought and scholarship. Turnhout: Brepols. pp. 357–376. ISBN 2-503-50541-4.
- Watt, Holly (20 January 2015). "The January Parliament and how it defined Britain". The Telegraph. Archived from the original on 12 January 2022.
- Labarge, Margaret Wade. Simon de Montfort (London: Eyre & Spottiswoode, 1962)
- Willis-Bund, J W; Page, William, eds. (1924). "The city of Worcester: Introduction and borough". A History of the County of Worcester: Volume 4. London: British History Online. pp. 376–390.
- Worcester News (25 January 2001). "Into battle to defend Simon de Montfort". Worcester News.
- Zerner, Monique (1992). "Lépouse de Simon de Montfort et la croisade albigeoise". In Dufournet, Jean; Joris, André; Toubert, Pierre (eds.). Femmes: mariages-lignages, XIIe–XIVe siècles: mélanges offerts à Georges Duby. Brussels: De Boeck Université. pp. 449–470. ISBN 2-8041-1542-9.
