= Simon de Montfort the Younger =

Second son of Simon de Montfort, 6th Earl of Leicester

Simon de Montfort
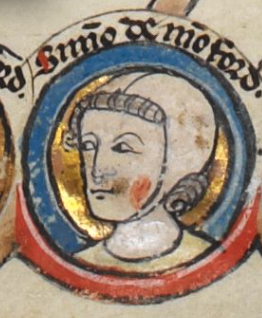
- Born: April 1240
- Died: 1271 (aged 30–31)
- Parents: Simon de Montfort, 6th Earl of Leicester (father); Eleanor of England (mother)

Simon VI^{[a]} de Montfort (April 1240 – 1271), known as Simon de Montfort the Younger, was the second son of Simon de Montfort, 6th Earl of Leicester and Eleanor of England.

His father and his elder brother Henry were killed at the Battle of Evesham in August 1265. The younger Simon had been slow to bring his forces from London, and had seen them and their banners captured by Prince Edward, who then used the banners to trick Simon's father. He arrived at Evesham just in time to see his father's head atop a pike. The younger Simon tried to raise a rebellion in Lincolnshire, but this petered out by Christmas.

In 1266, Simon and his supporters were now stuck in Kenilworth Castle, which was previously owned by his father. Having promised to surrender the castle to King Henry III of England, Simon later changed his mind and so the King decided to besiege the castle on 21 June. The Siege of Kenilworth lasted six months, making it one of the longest sieges ever conducted in the British Isles. Simon surrendered the castle to the King on 14 December.

After the surrender at Kenilworth, Simon and his younger brother Guy escaped to France and Italy. In 1271 they discovered and murdered their cousin Henry of Almain (whom they blamed for the death of their father) at the San Silvestro church in Viterbo, for which they were excommunicated. Simon died later that year from Toscana virus at Siena, "cursed by God, a wanderer and a fugitive".

== Notes ==
^{a} Alternatively Simon VII. The discrepancy in numbering arises from confusion between Simon III de Montfort (died 1181) and his son Simon de Montfort (died 1188). The latter was historically unknown, and Simon III was believed to be the father (not the grandfather) of the crusader Simon de Montfort, 5th Earl of Leicester, who is therefore known as Simon IV in some sources and Simon V in others.

== Bibliography ==
- "Montfort, Simon of (1240-1271)" . Dictionary of National Biography. London: Smith, Elder & Co. 1885–1900.
