= Battle of Evesham =

1265 battle of the Second Barons' War in England

- Part of Second Barons' War
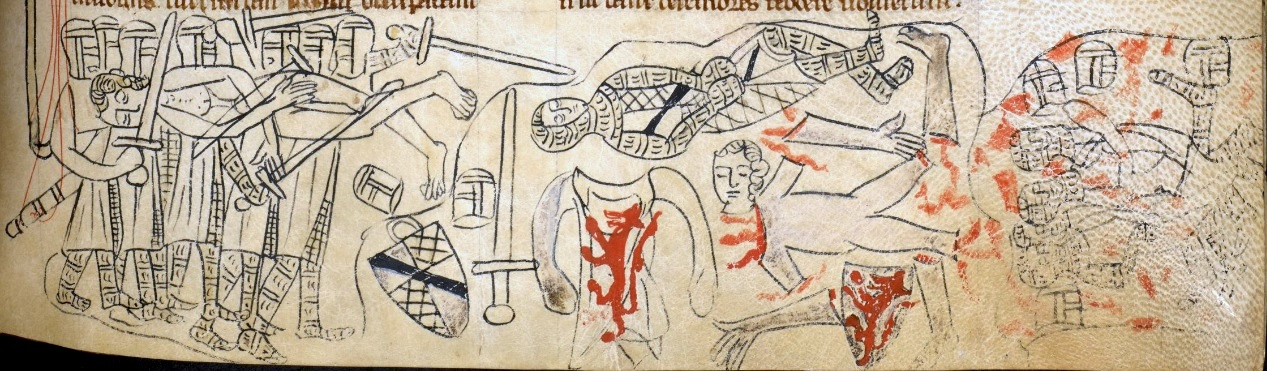
- Death and mutilation of de Montfort at the Battle of Evesham
Date	4 August 1265
Location	Evesham, Worcestershire 52°06′29″N 01°56′46″W
Result	Royal victory

Belligerents
Royal forces	Baronial forces Kingdom of Gwynedd

Commanders and leaders
Prince Edward; Gilbert de Clare; Humphrey de Bohun; John de Warenne; William de Valence; Roger Mortimer	Simon de Montfort †; Henry de Montfort †; Guy de Montfort (POW); Peter de Montfort †; Nicholas de Segrave (POW); Humphrey (V) de Bohun (POW); Hugh le Despenser †

Strength
c. 10,000	c. 5,000

Casualties and losses
Few	Nearly 4,000
- Location within England

The Battle of Evesham (4 August 1265) was one of the two main battles of 13th century England's Second Barons' War. It marked the defeat of Simon de Montfort, Earl of Leicester, and the rebellious barons by the future King Edward I, who led the forces of his father, King Henry III. It took place on 4 August 1265, near the town of Evesham, Worcestershire.

With the Battle of Lewes, de Montfort had won control of royal government, but after the defection of several close allies and the escape from captivity of Prince Edward, he found himself on the defensive. Forced to engage the royalists at Evesham, he faced an army twice the size of his own. The battle soon turned into a massacre; de Montfort himself was killed and his body mutilated. It was described by the contemporary historian Robert of Gloucester as the "murder of Evesham, for battle it was none". Though the battle effectively restored royal authority, scattered resistance remained until the Dictum of Kenilworth was signed in 1267.

== Background ==
Simon de Montfort, 6th Earl of Leicester, had gained a dominant position in the government of the Kingdom of England after his victory at the Battle of Lewes a year earlier. He also held the King, Prince Edward, and the King's brother Richard of Cornwall in his custody. However, his sphere of influence began to shrink rapidly, owing to loss of key allies. In February, Robert de Ferrers, Earl of Derby was arrested and imprisoned in the Tower. An even more important collaborator, Gilbert de Clare, the Earl of Gloucester, deserted to the side of the King in May of the same year. With Gloucester's assistance, Prince Edward escaped from de Montfort's captivity.

With the Lords of the Welsh Marches now in rebellion, de Montfort solicited the aid of Llywelyn ap Gruffudd, the Prince of Wales. Llywelyn agreed to help, in return for full recognition of his title and the promise that he could keep all military gains. Whatever benefits this alliance might have brought de Montfort, the large concessions cost him popularity at home. Meanwhile, Edward laid siege to the town of Gloucester, which fell on 29 June. De Montfort's goal now became to unite with the forces of his son Simon the Younger, and engage with the royal army, but the younger Simon moved much too slowly westwards from London. Eventually Simon the Younger reached the baronial stronghold of Kenilworth, but Edward managed to inflict great losses on his forces, many of whom were quartered outside the castle walls. From there the prince moved south, where on 4 August, using many banners captured at Kenilworth to deceive de Montfort into thinking his reinforcements were arriving, he managed to trap the older de Montfort in a loop of the Avon, blocking off the only bridge and thereby forcing de Montfort to fight without his son's reinforcements. When de Montfort realised this, he allegedly commented: "How skilfully they are advancing. Our bodies are theirs, our souls are God's."

== Battle ==
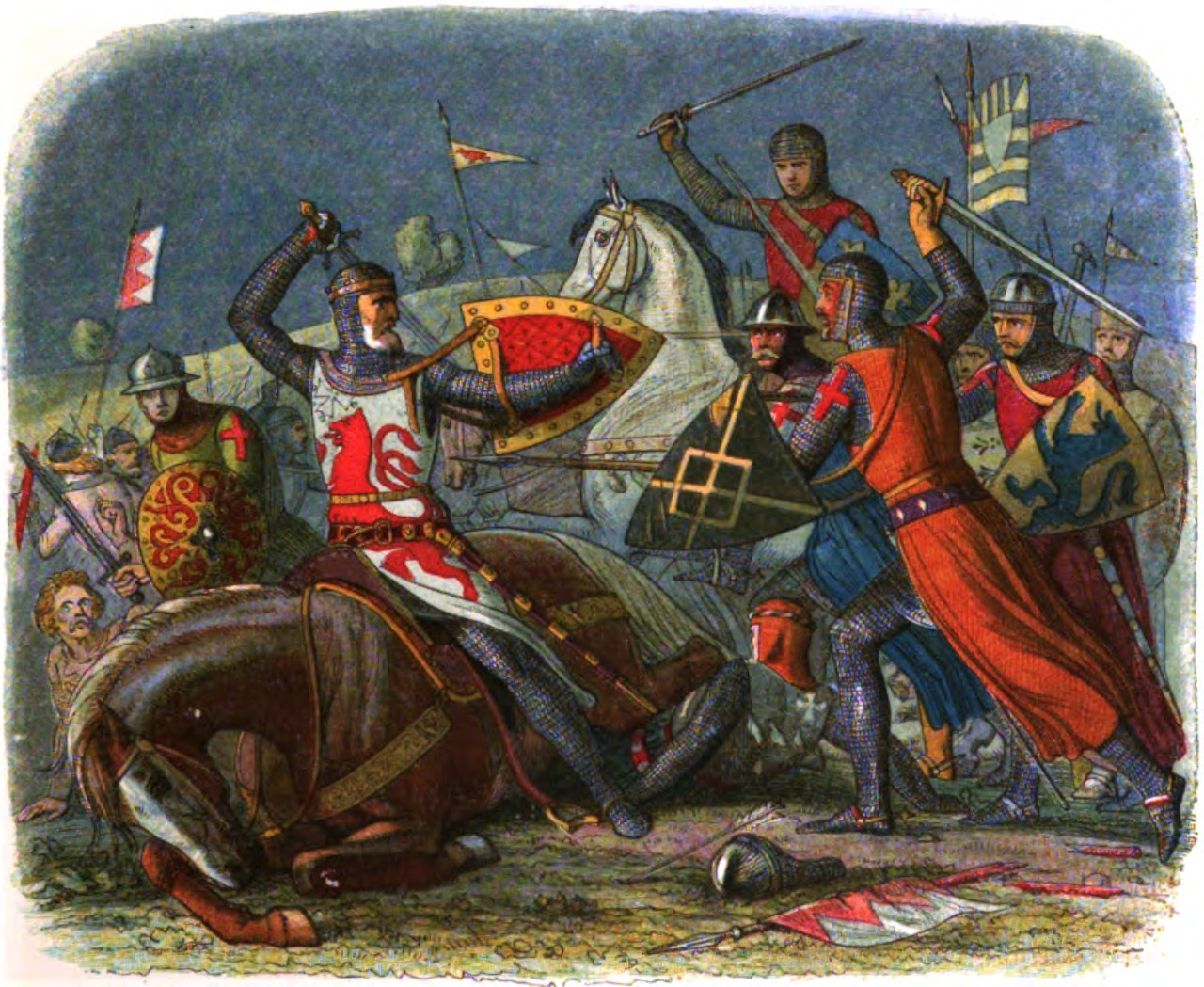
Simon de Montfort, 6th Earl of Leicester, in rebellion against Henry III, dies at the Battle of Evesham.

Heeding a lesson learned at the Battle of Lewes, the royalists took position on the high ground. Along a ridge called Green Hill, just north of Evesham, Edward set up his forces on the left, with Gloucester commanding the right. At about eight in the morning, de Montfort left the town of Evesham as a great thunderstorm began to rage. At Lewes, the baronial forces had gained confidence to win the day by a sense of divine destiny, reinforced by white crosses on their uniforms. This time the royal army had taken their lead, and wore a red cross as their distinguishing mark. According to the chronicler William Rishanger, when de Montfort saw the advance of the royal troops, he exclaimed that "They have not learned that for themselves, but were taught it by me."

The respective forces of the baronial and royal armies have been estimated to be 5,000 and 10,000 strong. De Montfort, facing such unfavourable numbers, decided to concentrate his forces on the centre of the enemy's front, hoping to drive a wedge through the line. Though the tactics were initially successful, the baronial forces soon lost the initiative, especially as the Welsh infantry provided by Llywelyn ap Gruffudd had proved unreliable, and deserted at an early point. The flanks of the royal army closed in on de Montfort's, surrounding them. With de Montfort confronted by a force twice the size of his own, on unfavourable ground, the battle rapidly turned into a massacre.

With their defeat at Lewes still fresh in memory, the royalists fought with a strong sense of bitterness and resentment. As a result, and despite attempts to surrender, most of the baronial rebels were killed on the battlefield rather than taken prisoner and ransomed, as was the common custom and practice. In what has been referred to as "an episode of noble bloodletting unprecedented since the Conquest", de Montfort's son Henry was killed first, then Simon himself lost his horse and died fighting. His body was mutilated; his head, hands, feet and testicles cut off. King Henry himself, who had been in the custody of de Montfort and dressed up in his colours, was barely rescued from the mêlée by Roger de Leybourne, a converted rebel.

== Aftermath ==
The royalists were eager to settle scores after de Montfort's defeat. At the Parliament at Winchester in September the same year, all those who had taken part in the rebellion were disinherited. Yet even though the uprising of the younger Simon de Montfort in Lincolnshire was over by Christmas, scattered resistance remained. The main problem was the garrison encamped at the virtually impregnable Kenilworth Castle, and a siege started in the summer of 1266 seemed futile. By the end of October, the royalists drew up the so-called Dictum of Kenilworth, whereby rebels were allowed to buy back their land at prices dependent on their level of involvement in the rebellion. The defenders of the castle turned down the offer at first, but by the end of the year conditions had become intolerable, and in 1267 the Dictum was agreed upon.

In regard to wide-scale confrontations, the Battle of Evesham and its aftermath proved decisive: it ended baronial opposition in the reign of Henry III. The kingdom now entered into a period of unity and progress that lasted into the early 1290s.

== See also ==
- Henry de Bracton (overseeing hearings for the disinherited)

== Bibliography ==
- Ambler, Sophie T. (2019), The Song of Simon de Montfort: The Life and Death of a Medieval Revolutionary, Oxford: Oxford University Press ISBN 0-19-094623-7
- Ambler, Sophie T. (2019), The Song of Simon de Montfort: England's First Revolutionary and the Death of Chivalry, London: Picador ISBN 978-1-5098-3757-1
- Brooks, Richard (2015) Lewes and Evesham 1264–65; Simon de Montford and the Barons' War. Osprey Campaign Series #285. Osprey Publishing. ISBN 978 1-4728-1150-9
- Burne, A. H. (1950, reprint 2002), The Battlefields of England London: Penguin ISBN 0-14-139077-8
- English Heritage Battlefield Report: Evesham 1265 (PDF). English Heritage. 1995. Archived from the original (PDF) on 1 August 2011.
- Maddicott, J. R. (1994), Simon de Montfort, Cambridge: Cambridge University Press ISBN 0-521-37493-6
- Powicke, F. M. (1953), The Thirteenth Century: 1216–1307, Oxford: Clarendon. ISBN 0-19-285249-3
- Prestwich, Michael (1988), Edward I, London: Methuen London ISBN 0-413-28150-7
- Prestwich, Michael (2005), Plantagenet England: 1225–1360, Oxford: Oxford University Press ISBN 0-19-822844-9
