= Conches =

Conches is the plural form of conch, a type of mollusk. It may also refer to:

== Places in France ==
- Conches-en-Ouche, a commune in the Eure département in northern France near Évreux
  - Château de Conches-en-Ouche, a ruined castle in the commune of Conches-en-Ouche
- Conches-sur-Gondoire, a commune on the Gondoire river in Brie, in the Seine-et-Marne department in the Île-de-France region near Paris
- Conques, a former commune in the Aveyron department in southern France, in the Midi-Pyrénées region, location of the famous abbey, now part of Conques-en-Rouergue

== People ==
- Raoul IV de Conches born Ralph de Tosny (before 1080 – 1126), a Norman nobleman
- Isabel of Conches, wife of Ralph of Tosny
- William of Conches (c. 1090 – after 1154), French scholastic philosopher who sought to expand the bounds of Christian humanism by studying secular works of the classics and fostering empirical science
- Peter of Courtenay, Lord of Conches (c. 1218 – 1249 or 1250), French knight and a member of the Capetian House of Courtenay, a cadet line of the royal House of Capet
- Félix-Sébastien Feuillet de Conches (1798-1887), French diplomat, journalist, writer and collector

== See also ==
- Conch (disambiguation)
- Conchs
