= Albert de Gresle =

11th century lord of the manor of Manchester

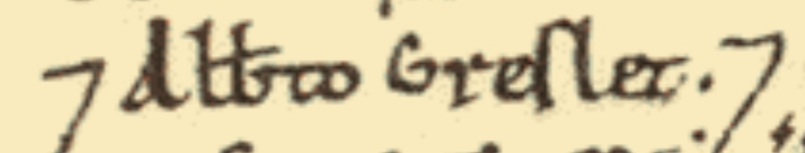
"Alberto Greslet". Albert's name as it appears in the Domesday Book.

Albert de Gresle (fl. 1086 - 1094) was a non-resident lord of the manor of Manchester.

== Origins ==
Various antiquarians believed that the Gresle family originated from Malahulc, purported uncle of Rollo, from whom descended Roger I of Tosny, ancestor of the future Gresley Baronets. William Robert Whatton disputed this, claiming the origin and descent of the Gresle family to be separate to that of the Derbyshire baronets. He noted the distinct armorial bearings, and noting that no document records the Gresleys holding land in Lancashire. Later historians such as James Tait and Falconer Madan supported Whatton's refutation of this purported origin.

In The History of the County Palatine and Duchy of Lancaster, James Croston identified Albert Gresle as actually Albert Bussel, brother of Lord Warin Bussel of Penwortham. Tait stated in Mediæval Manchester and the beginnings of Lancashire that "this wild identification affords a good illustration of the mingled ignorance and rashness of too many local antiquaries".

Albert's surname likely originated from the Old French term greslet, meaning pock-marked or pitted. This was likely an attribute of either Albert, or one of his ancestors. In the Domesday book, he is known as Albert crematus (Albert the Burnt). It is difficult to tell whether this was a previous family name or a nickname.

== Career ==
Following the Norman Conquest of England, Roger the Poitevin granted Albert lands in Norfolk, Lincoln, Nottingham, and in conjunction with Roger de Busli the Blackburn Hundred.

Sometime after 1086, Albert resigned his fee in Blackburn, and instead obtained a grant of the manor of Manchester within the Salford Hundred.

Albert was a witness to Roger de Poitevin's charter establishing the Lancaster Priory in 1094.

== Bibliography ==
- Farrer, William; Brownbill, John (1906). The Victoria history of the county of Lancaster. Vol. 1. London [Constable]. pp. 326–327.
- Whatton, William Robert (1824). Observations on the armorial bearing of the town of Manchester, and on the descent of the baronial family of Grelley. Author.
- Tait, James (1904). Mediæval Manchester and the beginnings of Lancashire. Manchester University Press.
