= Godehilde of Tosny =

Medieval noblewoman

- Died: c. 15 October 1097; Marash
- Buried: Cilicia
- Wars and battles: First Crusade
- Noble family: Tosny
- Spouse: Baldwin of Boulogne
- Father: Raoul II of Tosny
- Mother: Isabel of Conches

Godehilde of Tosny (or Godevere, died 1097) was a Norman noblewoman of the House of Tosny and the first wife of Baldwin I of Jerusalem. She was the daughter of Raoul II of Tosny, a companion of William the Conqueror, and Isabel of Conches. Her husband took her along with him on the First Crusade, resulting in her untimely death.

== Life ==
=== Early life and marriage ===
Born to the powerful noble House of Tosny, Godehilde was the only known daughter of Raoul II of Tosny, lord of Conches-en-Ouche, where she was likely raised. Raoul was a loyal ally to William the Conqueror and held a significant amount of land in England after the Battle of Hastings in 1066, bringing riches to his family as a result. His western lands were mainly in Herefordshire and Worcestershire, and his eastern lands were in Norfolk. Most of his activity can be traced to Normandy, and he participated in Robert Curthose’s rebellion in 1078.

At an unspecified time, Godehilde married Baldwin of Boulogne, who became king of Jerusalem after her death. Although Godehilde was not an heiress, her marriage to Baldwin gave him a gateway to various connections in Normandy, and the pairing was therefore more advantageous to him than to Godehilde. However, it is possible that Baldwin's status as a literatus was seen as Godehilde's prize. The couple likely settled in the court of Count Eustace III of Boulogne, Baldwin’s eldest brother, who also secured Godehilde’s marriage to him in the first place. Baldwin regularly visited the fortress of his wife’s family in Conches-en-Ouche and was residing with his Norman in-laws in early 1090.

=== The First Crusade ===
==== Byzantine conflicts ====
On 15 August 1096, Baldwin of Boulogne departed for the First Crusade with his brother Godfrey of Bouillon’s army, bringing Godehilde with him. The crusaders reached Hungary in September, and Godfrey discussed the conditions of their march through the kingdom with Coloman of Hungary while Baldwin was left in charge of the army. It was decided that Godehilde and Baldwin, along with their retainers, would be handed over as hostages to ensure the army’s good conduct. Baldwin was enraged by this and only agreed when Godfrey offered to become a hostage in his place, which calmed him down. The couple were released soon after the crusaders left Hungary, and his family left on good terms with the king, who displayed his affection through gift-giving and the kiss of peace. The army then entered the Byzantine Empire in late November and reached Constantinople on 23 December 1096. The crusading leaders, including Baldwin, pledged fealty to Alexios I Komnenos after extreme resistance and leave the city in early April of 1097.

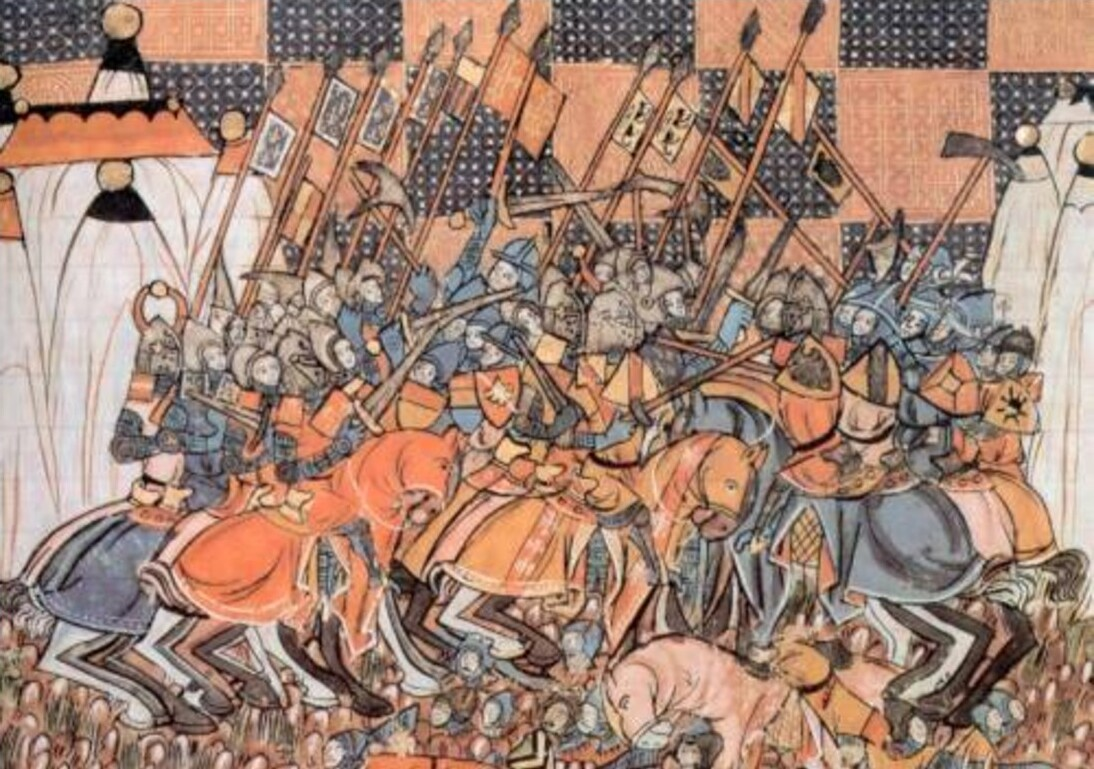
The Battle of Dorylaeum

After the Siege of Nicaea in May and June left the crusaders betrayed when Alexios took the city without their knowledge, the army left on 26 June 1097. At this point, the crusading army split into two parts; Godehilde followed her husband and joined the group led by Baldwin of Boulogne, Godfrey of Bouillon, Raymond IV of Toulouse, Stephen II of Blois, and Hugh of Vermandois. Just three days later, the crusaders learned that the Turks were planning an ambush in Dorylaeum after Bohemond of Taranto, a leader of the other group, noticed scouts shadowing his army. After the crusaders united for a decisive victory at the Battle of Dorylaeum on 1 July 1097, Baldwin of Boulogne and Tancred of Hauteville broke off from the main army as the others marched to Antioch, leaving Godehilde behind.

==== Separation from Baldwin and death ====
When Baldwin of Boulogne left for Cilicia with Tancred, Godehilde was to remain with the main army. According to the historian Susan B. Edgington, this could have been because of a previous long-standing illness or because her husband's expedition was not seen as suitable for women. This army was led by Godfrey of Bouillon, Bohemond of Taranto, Raymond of Toulouse, Robert of Flanders, Robert Curthose, and Adhemar of Le Puy. The crusaders stopped in Marash for a few days, where the Turks had fled before they even arrived. During this stay, various sources claimed that Godfrey was attacked by a bear, leaving him wounded and incapacitated. Upon hearing of what happened to his brother, Baldwin rushed to join the main army in Marash to see how he was doing, now permanently splitting off from Tancred. It was only after Baldwin arrived that Godehilde succumbed to her illness, dying around 15 October 1097.

== Legacy ==
While it is impossible to determine how Godehilde's death impacted Baldwin emotionally, it impacted him politically for many years to come. Historian Malcolm Barber claims that Godehilde's death "may have been the decisive event that persuaded" Baldwin "to seek out a lordship in the East". Now that Baldwin was widowed, he was also able to seek out a more politically advantageous marriage later on.

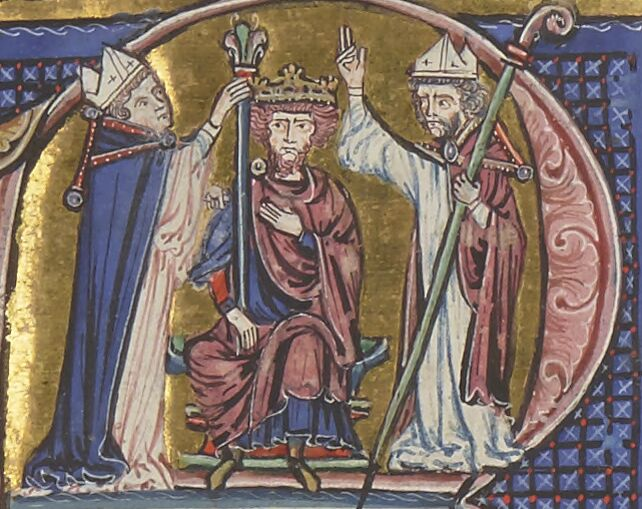
Baldwin's coronation, as illustrated in a 13th-century text (Bibliothèque nationale de France)

There is much debate among historians regarding whether or not Godehilde had children with Baldwin. According to the historians Steven Runciman and Christopher MacEvitt, the couple had children who did not long survive their mother, but the historian Alan V. Murray emphasizes that no primary sources mention this. According to Murray, Runciman was wrong when he translated William of Tyre's words about Baldwin's "familia" as a reference to his family, and that the chronicler was instead referring to Baldwin's household.

William of Jumièges has mentioned that the nobleman Robert de Neubourg married Godehilde. (Note: "Il prit pour femme la sœur de Roger du Ternois, fille de Raoul II, nommée Godechilde") Although it is possible that Godehilde could have married both Robert and Baldwin, it is highly possible that William made a mistake by referring to her.

== Sources ==
- Murray, Alan V. (2000). The Crusader Kingdom of Jerusalem: a dynastic history 1099 - 1125. Unit for Prosopographical Research. ISBN 978-1-900934-03-9.
- Runciman, Steven (1989). A History of the Crusades, Volume I: The First Crusade and the Foundation of the Kingdom of Jerusalem. Cambridge: Cambridge University Press. ISBN 978-0-521-06161-2.
- Mason, Emma (1979). "Magnates, curiales, and the Wheel of Fortune". In Brown, Reginald Allen (ed.). Proceedings of the Battle Conference on Anglo-Norman Studies: 1979. Vol. II. The Boydell Press.
- Edgington, Susan (2019). Baldwin I of Jerusalem, 1100-1118. Rulers of the Latin East. London; New York: Routledge, Taylor and Francis Group. ISBN 978-1-4724-3356-5.
- Moore, James (2017). The Norman Aristocracy in the Long Eleventh Century: Three Case Studies (PhD thesis). University of Oxford.
- Hodgson, Natasha (2013). "Lions, Tigers and Bears: encounters with wild animals and bestial imagery in the context of crusading to the Latin East". Viator. 44 (1). Brepols: 65–93. doi:10.1484/J.VIATOR.1.103142.
- Barber, Malcolm (2012). The crusader states. New Haven: Yale University Press. ISBN 978-0-300-11312-9.
- MacEvitt, Christopher (2008). The crusades and the Christian world of the East: rough tolerance. The Middle Ages series. Philadelphia: University of Pennsylvania Press. ISBN 978-0-8122-4050-4.
