= Raoul I of Tosny =

Norman lord

Raoul I of Tosny was Lord of Conches, and probably an heir of Raoul, brother of Archbishop Hugh of Rouen.

In 1013 or 1014 Duke Richard II entrusted Raoul (together with his son Roger and Nigel, viscount of Cotentin) with the castle at Tillières-sur-Avre, where he defeated Odo II, count of Blois-Chartres.

There is evidence that Raoul participated in the wars in Southern Italy, probably following a dispute with Richard. The evidence points out to his participation in the rebellion against the Byzantines in 1017, and according to Raoul Glaber he was welcomed back by Richard in 1023, after fighting alongside King Henry II of Germany against the Byzantines in 1022.

Raoul died probably in 1026.

== Family ==
Raoul married Godehildis of Barcelona. They had:

- Walter de Tosny
- Agnes de Tosny
- Robert de Tosny he married Adele
- Roger I of Tosny who inherited his lands and titles.
- Bertha de Tosny she married Seigneur de Laval Guy de Laval
- Hugh de Tosny (de Limesi) married Christine de Conteville
- Berenger de Tosny

== Sources ==
- Keats-Rohan, K. S. B. (1993). "The Prosopography of Post-Conquest England: Four case studies". Medieval Prosopography. 14 (1 (Spring)): 1–52.
