= Conch (disambiguation) =

A conch is a kind of large sea snail, especially those in the family Strombidae.

Conch or The Conch may also refer to:

== Places ==
- Conch Key in Florida
- Conch Republic, Key West, Florida micronation

== Architecture ==
- Conch (architecture), semicircular apse or its domed roof
- Conch house, a style of architecture found in Key West and Miami, Florida

== Art, entertainment, and media ==
- "Conch", Patti Smith poem in kodak (book)
- The Conch, an album by the band moe
- The Conch (theatre company), a contemporary Pacific theatre company founded by Nina Nawalowalo

== Musical instruments ==
- Conch (instrument), a musical instrument made from a seashell
- Horagai, a shell used as a musical instrument in Japan

== Other uses ==
- Anhui Conch Cement Company, Chinese business
- Conch (people), a people of Bahamas and Florida
- Conch (SSH), secure-shell software written in python
- Conch awards for audio production
- Conch piercing, modification of human ear
- Shankha, a shell used as a ritual object in Hinduism

== See also ==
- Conche (disambiguation)
- Conk, an African-American hairstyle
