= House of Tosny =

Noble family

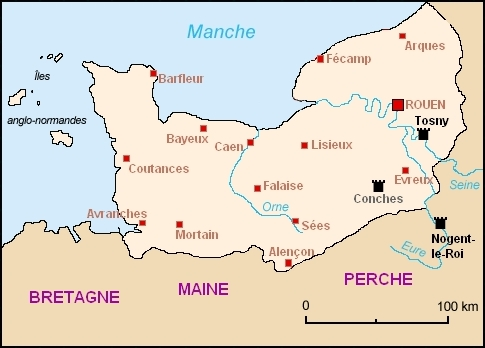
The duchy of Normandy in the second half of the 11th century, with the principal castles of the house of Tosny (in black)

The House of Tosny was an important noble family in 10th and 11th century Normandy, though it did not include any comtes or vicomtes. Its founder was Raoul I of Tosny (died after 1024).

== Origin ==
The earliest account of the origin of the Tosny family is that of the late-11th century Acta Archiepiscoporum Rotomagensium (The Acts of the Archbishops of Rouen), which refers to a 'powerful man', Raoul, son of Hugh de Calvacamp, of illustrious stock, and brother of Hugh III, Archbishop of Rouen. The latter was active from 942 to 989 and had formerly been a monk at St. Denis, so some have suggested a French origin for the family, a Scandinavian origin, however, is also possible. The Archbishop gave Raoul lands at Tosny, taken from the church's holdings. They formed part of an elite which appeared around dukes Richard I and Richard II at the turn of the 10th to 11th century. In the early 12th century the family had been given a Norman pedigree, chronicler Orderic Vitalis wrote in an interpolation into the Gesta Normanorum Ducum of William of Jumièges that Roger de Tosny, then Lord of Tosny and Conches, was “de stirpe Malahulcii qui Rollonis ducis patruus...” (of the lineage of Malahulc, uncle of Duke Rollo).

As with several Norman families, the Tosnys gained power through the recovery of church goods. Hughes, Archbishop of Rouen (942–989) split off lands from the cathedral's lands and gave them to his brother Raoul, probably an ancestor of Raoul I of Tosny. They also received grants of land from the dukes of Normandy, notably Richard II. The house of Tosny probably acquired part of its fortune from foreign adventures. Raoul I fought in the County of Apulia as part of the Norman conquest of southern Italy, while the chroniclers report the somewhat legendary exploits of Roger I in Hispania during the first quarter of the 11th century. His wife, Godehildis/Gotelina, was linked to a miracle at Sainte-Foy de Conques.

== Expansion and decline ==
Raoul II, grandson of Roger I, was at the court of William the Conqueror (1035–1087), and was the Norman standard bearer in 1054. For his participation in the Norman Conquest of England in 1066, he was rewarded with domains there, most notably the two baronies of Flamstead (Hertfordshire) and Wrethamthorpe (Norfolk). Three other family members were also rewarded: Raoul's brother Robert de Stafford, and also Robert de Todeni of Belvoir and his son Béranger, who belonged to a collateral branch.

In the Duchy of Normandy, the 1077 marriage between Raoul II and Isabelle de Montfort allowed the Tosnys to direct the châtellenie of Nogent-le-Roi, which they held onto until around 1200. The family possessions thus stretched as far as the border of the duchy of Normandy. They were particularly active during the troubles which followed William I's death (1087) and the subsequent conflict between Empress Matilda and King Stephen (1135–1144).

Arms of de Tosny: Argent, a maunch gules, adopted in the 13th century

After 1066, as Lucien Musset remarks, the Tosnys showed themselves especially liberal to their English fiefdoms but avoided diminishing their Norman lands. Orderic Vitalis mentions four main castles in their Norman barony in 1119: Conches-en-Ouche, Tosny, Portes, Acquigny. According to the 1172 state of its fiefdoms, the "honneur" amounted to 50 or 51 knights' fiefs. The lands were mostly found in Haute-Normandie, more precisely between Risle and Iton. The vast forêt de Conches formed its centre. It also had scattered domains in the Eure valley (Fontaine-sous-Jouy, Cailly-sur-Eure, Planches, Acquigny), the Seine valley (Tosny, Villers-sur-le-Roule, Bernières-sur-Seine), in Vexin Normand (Vesly, Guerny, Villers-en-Vexin, Hacqueville, Heuqueville, Val de Pîtres), in Pays de Caux and Talou around Blainville-Crevon, Mortemer (Seine-Maritime, Mortemer-sur-Eaulne), Dieppe and Yerville. Many of these lands were let out to vassals, notably les Clères.

In spite of these extensive holdings, the 12th century gives the impression of a decline in the Tosny family fortunes in comparison to some of the neighbouring houses in eastern Normandy. In 1204 Roger IV of Tosny lost his continental fiefdoms as a result of his support for John and thus the family had to withdraw to England. In addition to their barony of Flamstead in Hertfordshire, they captured Pain's Castle in Elfael. In 1309, the male line of the Tosnys became extinct, and their English lands passed to their sole heiress, Alice de Toeni, Countess of Warwick.

== Genealogy ==
- Hugh de Calvacamp 914–990. His son:
  - Ralph (Raoul I) de Toeni born before 970. His son:
    - Roger de Toeni (990–1039) married Godeheut (Adelaide) d'Évreux. Their children:
      - Helbert de Toeni (d.1039/40)
      - Helinand de Toeni (d. May 1039, in Conches)
      - Vuazo de Toeni
      - Robert de Toeni, Lord of Stafford. Apparently married Avice de Clare, daughter of Richard fitz Gilbert (de Clare) son of Gilbert, Count of Brionne, by whom he had sons, variously listed as:
        - Nicholas I de Stafford (d.c.1138), eldest son and heir, 2nd feudal baron of Stafford. For descent from him see feudal barony of Stafford.
        - Alan de Stafford
        - Roger de Stafford
        - Jordan de Stafford
        - Nigel de Stafford
        - Robert de Stafford
      - Béranger l'Espagnol de Toeni.
      - Adelise de Toeni married Guillaume Fils Osbern.
        - William of Breteuil, who succeeded his father in Normandy. He was held captive and tortured by Ascelin Gouel de Perceval 'Lupus', Sire d'Yvry, until he finally granted his daughter Isabella de Breteuil in marriage to him.
        - Roger de Breteuil, 2nd Earl of Hereford, who succeeded his father in England and Wales;
        - Emma de Breteuil, wife of Ralph de Gael, 1st Earl of Norfolk
      - Berthe de Toeni married Guy de Laval.
      - (Ralph / Raoul II) de Toeni (1027–1102), successor of his father; married Isabel de Montfort of Conches (1057–1147)
        - Roger, died young
        - Godehilde married Baldwin I of Jerusalem, no children
        - Raoul III de Conches, married Alice of Huntingdon, daughter of Waltheof, Earl of Northumbria, and Judith of Lens.
          - Hugues
          - Margaret de Tosny, married Walter de Clifford of Clifford Castle
            - Rosamund the Fair
            - Walter de Clifford (c. 1160 – 17 January 1221)
            - Gilbert
            - Richard
            - Amicia, married Osbern fitz Hugh of Richards Castle
            - Lucia, married Hugh de Say of Clun Castle
          - Roger III de Tosny (1104–1162), married Ida de Hainaut and had by her:
            - Ralph IV de Tosny (1132–1162; Lord of Flamstead) married Margaret de Beaumont (1125–1185; Lady Margaret of Leicester) . Their children:
              - Ida de Tosny (1160–1204), mistress of King Henry II by whom she had William Longespee, and wife of Roger Bigod (1144–1221)
              - Roger IV de Toeni (d. 1208; Lord of Flamstead, Knight de Conches), married Constance de Beaumont. Their son:
                - Ralph V de Toeni (1189–1239; Lord of Flamstead), married Petronilla (Pernel) de Lacy (1198–1238). Their son:
                  - Roger V de Toeni (1235–1274) married Alice (Cecilia) de Bohun. Their son:
                    - Ralph VII de Toeni (1255–1295; of Flamstead) married Mary (1255–1284). Their children:
                      - Robert de Toeni, Lord Toeni of Flamsted (1276–1309), married Maud, daughter of Malise III, Earl of Strathearn. Died childless, leaving his sister as heir.
                      - Alice de Toeni (1283–1324) married Guy de Beauchamp (1272–1325; 10th earl of Warwick).

Hugues de Calvacamp
│
├─>Hugues, archbishop of Rouen (942–989)
│
│
└─>Raoul I of Tosny († 1024/1025)
   │
   ├─>...
   │  │
   │  ?
   │  └─>Robert of Tosny († 1088), lord de Belvoir
   │     │
   │     │
   │     ├─> Béranger de Tosny
   │     │
   │     │
   │     └─> Alice de Tosny († après 1129)
   │         X Roger Bigod of Norfolk
   │
   └─>Roger (?) 
	       |

Roger I of Tosny, Or Roger d'Espagne († c.1040)

          X Godehildis/Gotelina
          │
          ├─>Herbert († c.1040)
          │
          ├─>Helinant († c.1040)
          │
          ├─>Raoul II de Conches and de Tosny († 1102)
          │  X Isabelle de Montfort
          │  │
          │  ├─>Raoul III of Tosny, called the young († 1126)
          │  │  X Adelise daughter of Waltheof II, Earl of Northumbria
          │  │  │  
          │  │  │  
          │  │  │
          │  │  ├─>Roger III († c.1157/1162)
          │  │  │  X Ida de Hainaut
          │  │  │  │
          │  │  │  │
          │  │  │  └─>Raoul IV († 1162)
          │  │  │     X Marguerite of Leicester
          │  │  │     │
          │  │  │     └─>Roger IV († 1208/1209) 
          │  │  │        X Constance de Beaumont        
          │  │  │
          │  │  └─>Hugues († c.1140)
          │  │

│ │

          │  ├─>Roger II († 1090/1091)
          │  │
          │  └─>Godehilde († 1097)
          │     X (1) Robert I of Meulan (doubtful)
          │     X (2) Baldwin of Boulogne, king of Jerusalem
          │
          ├─>Robert de Stafford († 1088)
          │  │
          │  └─>Nicolas de Stafford († vers 1138)
          │     │
          │     └─>Robert II de Stafford († c.1177–1185)
          │        │
          │        └─>Robert III de Stafford († c.1193/1194)
          │  
          ├─>Béranger l'Espagnol
          │
          ├─>Adelise
          │  X William FitzOsbern, 1st Earl of Hereford  
          │
          └─>Berthe († c.1040)

== See also ==
- Duchy of Normandy
- Roger I of Tosny
- Raoul II of Tosny
- Tosny
- Anglo-Norman
- Feudal barony of Clifford

== Bibliography ==
- (in French) Lucien Musset, "Aux origines d'une classe dirigeante : les Tosny, grands barons normands du X^{e} au XII^{e} siècle", Francia, vol. 5 (1878), pp. 45–80
