= Hugh of Rouen =

Hugh of Rouen may refer to:

- Hugh of Champagne, archbishop of Rouen (722–730)
- Hugh III, Archbishop of Rouen (942–989)
- Hugh of Amiens, archbishop of Rouen (1129–1164)

== See also ==
- Roman Catholic Archdiocese of Rouen, for other (arch)bishops named Hugh
