= Raoul II of Tosny =

Anglo-Norman noble

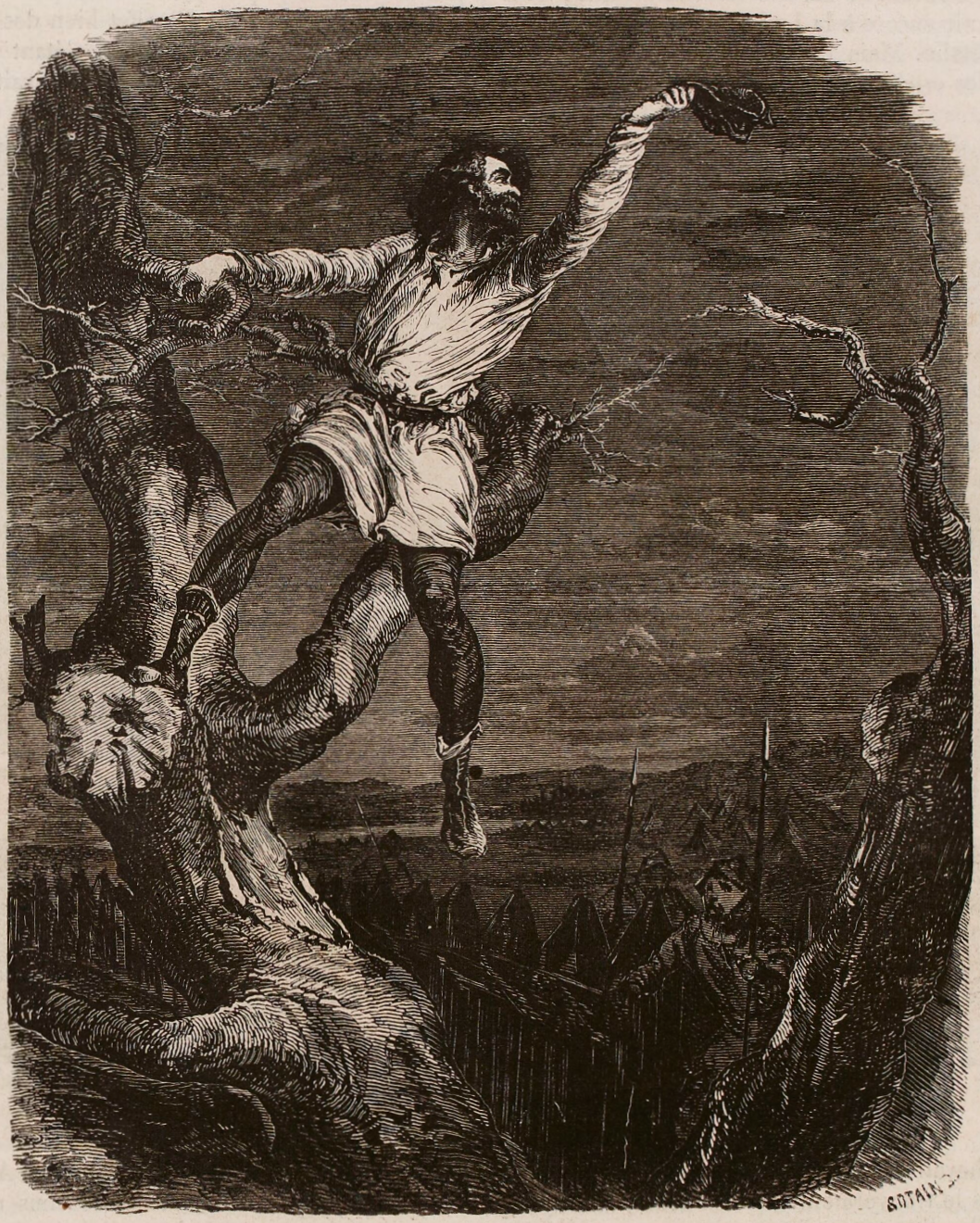
Illustration of Raoul de Tosny at the Battle of Mortemer: he climbed a tree near the king's camp and called out, "My name is Raoul de Teruois, and I bring you bad news. Drive your wagons and chariots to Mortemer to take away your friends who are dead, for the French have come to us to test the chivalry of the Normans, and they found it much stronger than they had hoped. Eudes, their standard-bearer, was put to shameful flight, and Cui, Count of Ponthieu, was captured. All the others were taken prisoner or died; or, fleeing quickly, had great difficulty escaping. Announce this news as soon as possible to the King of the French from the Duke of Normandy."

Raoul II de Tosny (Note: Variously Ralph Tosny, Ralph de Toeni, Ralph de Tonei, Ralph de Tony, Ralph de Toni, Ralph de Todeni, Ralph de Tosney, Raoul de Conches, Raoul de Toeny, Raf Thoney, Rafe de Tosny. Latin: Radulfus de Toieno.) (c. 1027 – 9 April 1102), lord of Conches-en-Ouche, was a Norman nobleman of the House of Tosny, son of Roger I of Tosny and older brother of Robert de Stafford / Tosny. He was active in Normandy, England and Wales.

== Before Hastings ==
Raoul was probably a minor when his father Roger I of Tosny was killed in battle, and spent his minority under Richard of Evreux, who married his mother, Godehildis. At some point after 1054, Roger de Cleres, Ralph's vassal, killed Robert de Beaumont, son of Humphrey de Vieilles, finally avenging the death of Raoul's father.

In 1054 Raoul participated in the Battle of Mortemer, probably as a standard-bearer of Duke William. Around 1061 Raoul was exiled and deprived of his lands, together with Arnold d'Échaffour and Arnold's cousin Hugh de Grandmesnil. They returned c. 1063 thanks to the intercession of Simon de Montfort-l'Amaury and Waleran de Breteuil-en-Beauvaisis. Raoul married Isabel de Conches, daughter of Simon, but is unclear if this was done before, during or after his exile.

== Hastings (1066) and its aftermath ==
Raoul is one of the few proven companions of William the Conqueror known to have fought at the Battle of Hastings in 1066. Tradition says he gave up the role of standard bearer, his hereditary office, to Walter Giffard, in order to be able to fight closer to William II, Duke of Normandy.

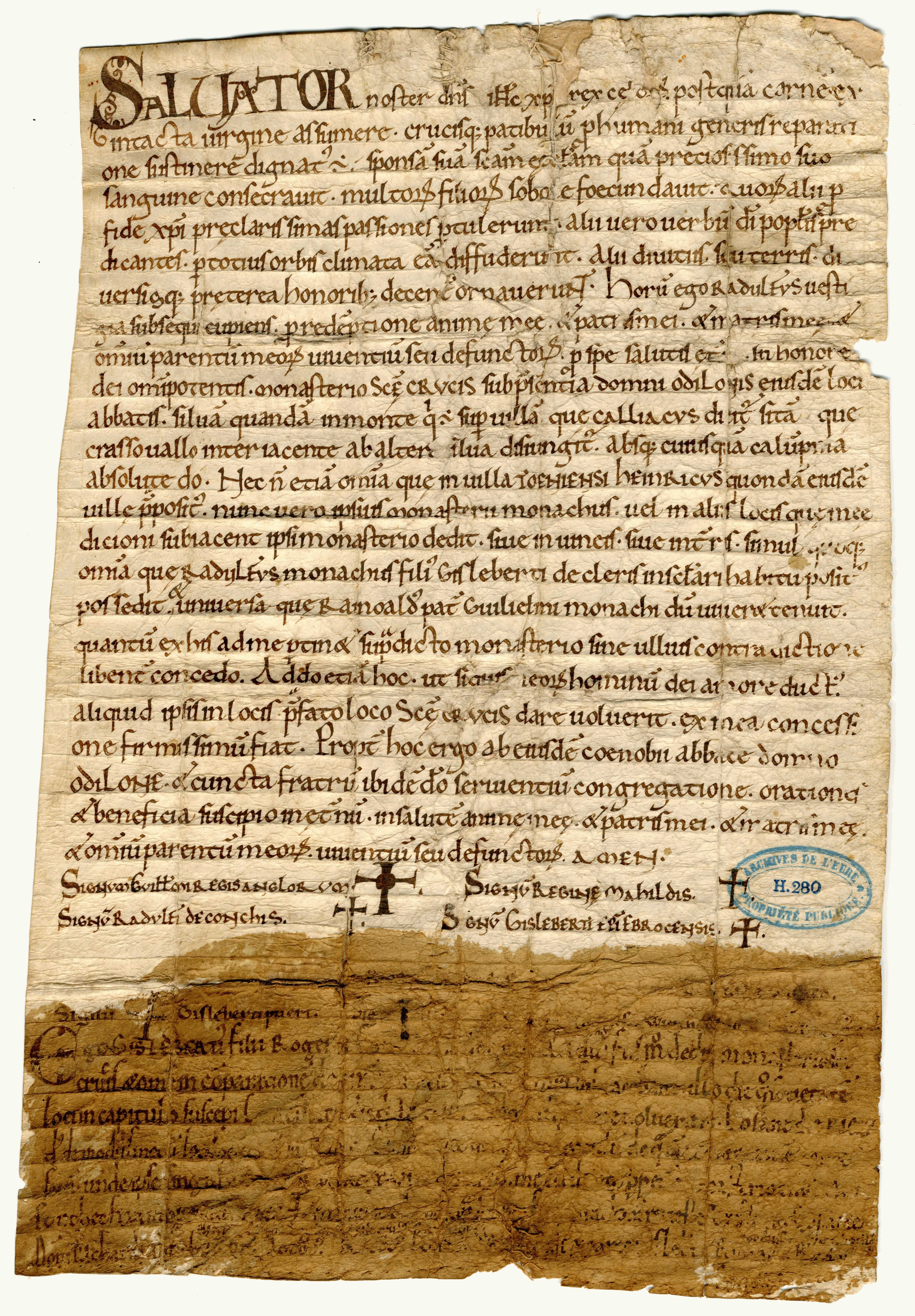
Donation by Raoul de Tosny to found an abbey at La Croix-Saint-Leufroy, c. 1071–1083.

After the conquest, Raoul held a significant amount of land in England. His western lands were concentrated in Herefordshire and Worcestershire, while his eastern possessions were mainly in Norfolk. The timing of these acquisitions is unclear. Some of it came directly after the conquest, but other parts probably came after the death of William FitzOsbern in 1071 and the forfeiture of Roger, earl of Hereford in 1075. He was granted Clifford Castle, and it is also believed that he held assets in the village of Hose, Leicestershire, which was split into two manors, Tosny's and that of the title holder of the Norman Belvoir Castle. However, most of his activity can be traced to Normandy, and he is said to have participated in Robert Curthose's rebellion in 1078.

After William the Conqueror's death in 1087, Raoul expelled the ducal garrisons from his castles and fought for Robert Curthose in 1088. In 1090, he fought against William of Breteuil and his half-brother William, Count of Évreux, sealing a victory when he captured the former. He obtained 3000 livres and the recognition of his son, Roger, as the heir to both.

In the conflict of 1094, Raoul fought for William Rufus against Robert Curthose. After the death of William Rufus, Raoul and Count William attacked Robert Beaumont. Raoul died in 1102 or 1103, and he was buried at the Abbey of Conches.

== Family ==
Raoul married Isabel of Conches, daughter of Simon I de Montfort. They had:

- Roger, died young.
- Raoul III de Conches, married Alice of Huntingdon, daughter of Waltheof, Earl of Northumbria, and Judith of Lens.
- Godehilde married Baldwin I of Jerusalem, accompanied him on crusade and died in 1097. Orderic Vitalis also mentions she died in Marasch in 1097.

Other sources also say she married Robert de Neubourg, son of Henry de Beaumont, 1st Earl of Warwick – William of Jumièges mentions this marriage and states that she was the daughter of 'Raoul II' de Tosny. Perhaps she married both men, unless William of Jumièges and others have made a mistake
