= Robert de Neubourg =

Anglo-Norman noble

Robert I de Neubourg (died 1159) was an Anglo-Norman aristocrat.

He was the fourth son of Henry de Beaumont, 1st Earl of Warwick, and inherited his father's Normandy lands, holding Neubourg (today Le Neubourg, near Louviers, Eure) from Waleran de Beaumont, 1st Earl of Worcester, a Beaumont family cousin, as Comte de Meulan. He was Sire du Ponteaudemer, and acquired other lands at Winfrith, Dorset. He took part in the Norman rebellion of 1118–1119, against Henry I of England, around William Clito. The immediate issue was a conflict with his feudal overlord, Waleran. He rebelled for a short time only, being burnt out of Neubourg. It was only in the early 1140s that Robert and Waleran resolved their difficulties formally.

Later he was steward, justiciar and seneschal of Normandy under Henry II of England.

== Family ==
He could have married Godehilde of Tosny (or Conches). William of Jumièges mentions this marriage and states that she was the daughter of Raoul II de Tosny. However, Godehilde was married to Baldwin I of Jerusalem, and it is highly possible that this was a mistake on William's part. His eldest son Henry de Neubourg (c. 1130 - 1214) inherited his lands in Normandy, while his younger son Roger de Newburgh (c. 1135 - 1192) inherited his lands in Dorset. Roger was responsible for the relocation of Bindon Abbey to Wool. Henry's lands were inherited by his brother Roger's son, Robert II de Neubourg (c. 1175 – c. 1260).
