= Conche (disambiguation) =

A conche is an agitator that evenly distributes cocoa butter within chocolate.

Conche may also refer to:

- Conche, Newfoundland and Labrador, Canada
- Lac de Conche, a lake in Switzerland
- Laghetto delle Conche, a lake on the island of Elba, Italy

== People with the surname ==
- Marcel Conche (1922-2022), French philosopher

== See also ==
- Conch
