= Robert de Stafford =

Norman nobleman

Robert de Stafford (c. 1039 – c. 1088) (alias Robert de Tosny/Toeni, etc.) was an Anglo-Norman nobleman, a member of the House of Tosny and the first feudal baron of Stafford in Staffordshire in England, where he probably built a baronial castle. His many landholdings are listed in the Domesday Book of 1086.

He was the son of Roger I of Tosny and the brother of Raoul II of Tosny.

He seems to have been the sheriff of Staffordshire.

He was a big landholder in England, and there is no evidence of him inheriting land in Normandy. The Domesday survey showed him to be tenant in chief of some 138 manors and lord of 32 others. His property concentrated in Staffordshire and Warwickshire. An analysis of his holdings also shows a strong presence of non-Norman subtenants, with a significant presence of English and Breton ones.

Moreover, he patronized many religious institutions, among them Evesham and Conches, prioritizing the former, which shows the importance he assigned to his holdings in England over the ones in Normandy. He founded Stone Priory in Staffordshire, which became the burial place of many of his family.

The analysis of both his subtenants and his patronage point out to a strategy much less concentrated in Normandy than his brother Raoul II, and almost solely centered in England.

He died c. 1088 and was buried at Evesham.

== Family and Descendants ==
Robert de Stafford married Avice de Clare, daughter of Richard fitz Gilbert (de Clare), by whom he had sons,

- Nicholas I de Stafford (d.circa 1138), eldest son and heir, 2nd feudal baron of Stafford.
- Alan de Stafford
- Roger de Stafford
- Jordan de Stafford
- Nigel de Stafford
- Robert de Stafford
