= Raoul III of Tosny =

Anglo-Norman nobleman

Raoul III of Tosny (1079-1126), Lord of Conches-en-Ouche (A commune in the Eure département in northern France), was an Anglo-Norman nobleman of the House of Tosny.

== Life ==
Born in 1079, Raoul was the son of Raoul II of Tosny and Isabel de Montfort.

Following the death of William II of England, Raoul III chose to support Henry I "Beauclerc" instead of Robert Curthose who was on crusade. On Raoul III's father's death in 1102, he crossed the Channel to take up his father's possessions in England, rallying to Henry and thus allowing himself to make a good marriage to Adelise, daughter and heiress of the Anglo-Saxon earl Waltheof of Northumbria.

From 1104, Raoul accompanied Henry in his campaign to conquer Normandy. After the Battle of Tinchebray (1106), the campaign led to the imprisonment of duke Robert Curthose and his replacement by Henry, thus re-uniting England and Normandy under one master as it had been at the time of William. Raoul III's support for Henry was confirmed during the revolt of the barons of eastern Normandy against Henry in 1118-1119. Raoul did not rally to the rebels.

Throughout the revolt, if Orderic Vitalis is to be believed, he appears to have remained neutral or flexible in his allegiances. The leader of the revolt (Raoul's uncle Amaury III of Montfort) explained to king Louis VI of France that he had to attack Normandy from the southeast since Raoul III was helping them. Amaury assured him that Raoul would join his vassals with Louis's troops and open four castles to him: Conches, Acquigny, Portes, Tosny.

In autumn 1119, Louis VI decided to intervene but the events that followed showed that Raoul III was not backing up Louis's force as Amaury had hoped and was not a sure supporter of the revolt. Raoul II de Gaël, one of Henry's supporters, suspected the Lord of Tosny of wanting to capture him. On Henry's advice, he conceded him Pont-Saint-Pierre and Val de Pîtres to keep him loyal

In 1123-1124, Amaury de Montfort began another revolt against the king, during which Raoul III remained loyal.

== Marriage and issue ==
Raoul married Adelise (Alice of Northumbria), daughter of Waltheof, earl of Northumbria and his wife Judith. They had:

- Hugues
- Margaret Isabel de Tosny, married Walter de Clifford
- Roger III de Tosny (1104-1162), married Ida de Hainaut

== Bibliography ==
- Mason, Emma (1979). "Magnates, curiales, and the Wheel of Fortune". In Brown, Reginald Allen (ed.). Proceedings of the Battle Conference on Anglo-Norman Studies: 1979. Vol. II. The Boydell Press.
- Pollock, M.A. (2015). Scotland, England and France after the Loss of Normandy, 1204-1296. The Boydell Press.
- Ritchie, Robert Lindsay Græme (1954). The Normans in Scotland. Edinburgh University Press.
- Orderic Vitalis, History of Normandy, éd. Guizot, volume IV, book XII and XIII, 1826
- Lucien Musset, "Aux origines d'une classe dirigeante : les Tosny, grands barons normands du Xe au XIIe siècle", Sonderdruck aus Francia Forschungen zur westeuropäischen Geschichte, Munich, 1978, p. 45-80
- Remfry. P.M., Clifford Castle, 1066 to 1299 (ISBN 1-899376-04-6)
