= Château de Conches-en-Ouche =

Ruined castle in Normandy, France

Coordinates: 48°57′41″N 0°56′36″E

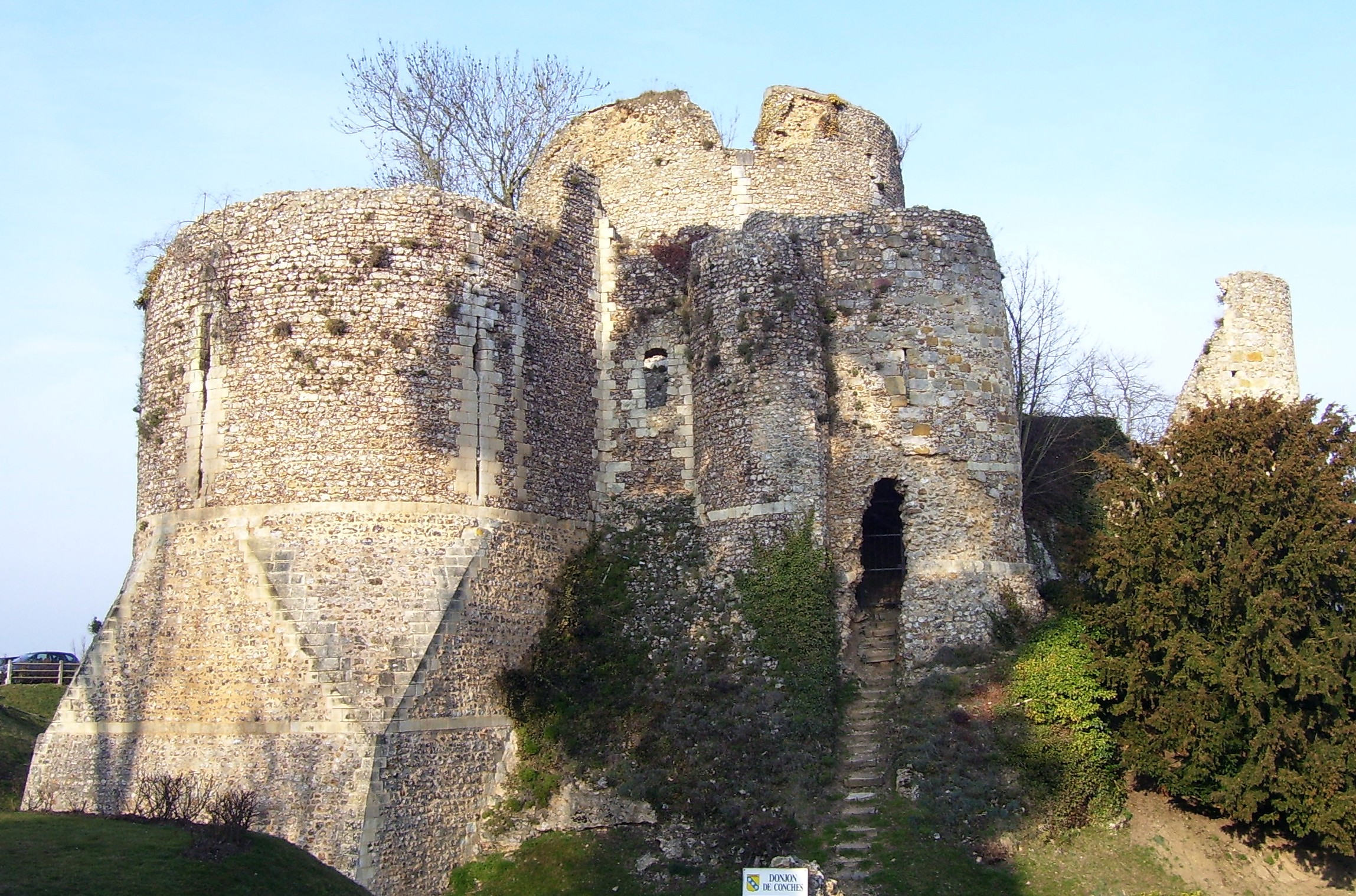
Keep of the Château de Conches-en-Ouche

The Château de Conches-en-Ouche is a ruined castle in the commune of Conches-en-Ouche in the Eure department of France, demolished in the 16th century.

== History ==
The start of construction dates back to 1034 and Roger I of Tosny. The castle was captured by Philip II of France in 1199. The castle was the target of bitter combat during the Hundred Years' War. Taken by the English in 1364, it was recaptured by Bertrand du Guesclin in 1371. The castle was lost again in 1420, retaken in 1440, lost once more in 1441 before being finally taken by the French in 1449.

In 1591, members of the Catholic League took refuge there; a potential base for enemies of the monarchy, it was demolished afterwards.

The castle has been designated as a monument historique by the French Ministry of Culture in 1886.

== Architecture ==
Originally built on a motte, the structure had walls 2.60 metres thick and at least three storeys.

== See also ==
- List of castles in France
