= Félix-Sébastien Feuillet de Conches =

French art collector (1798–1887)

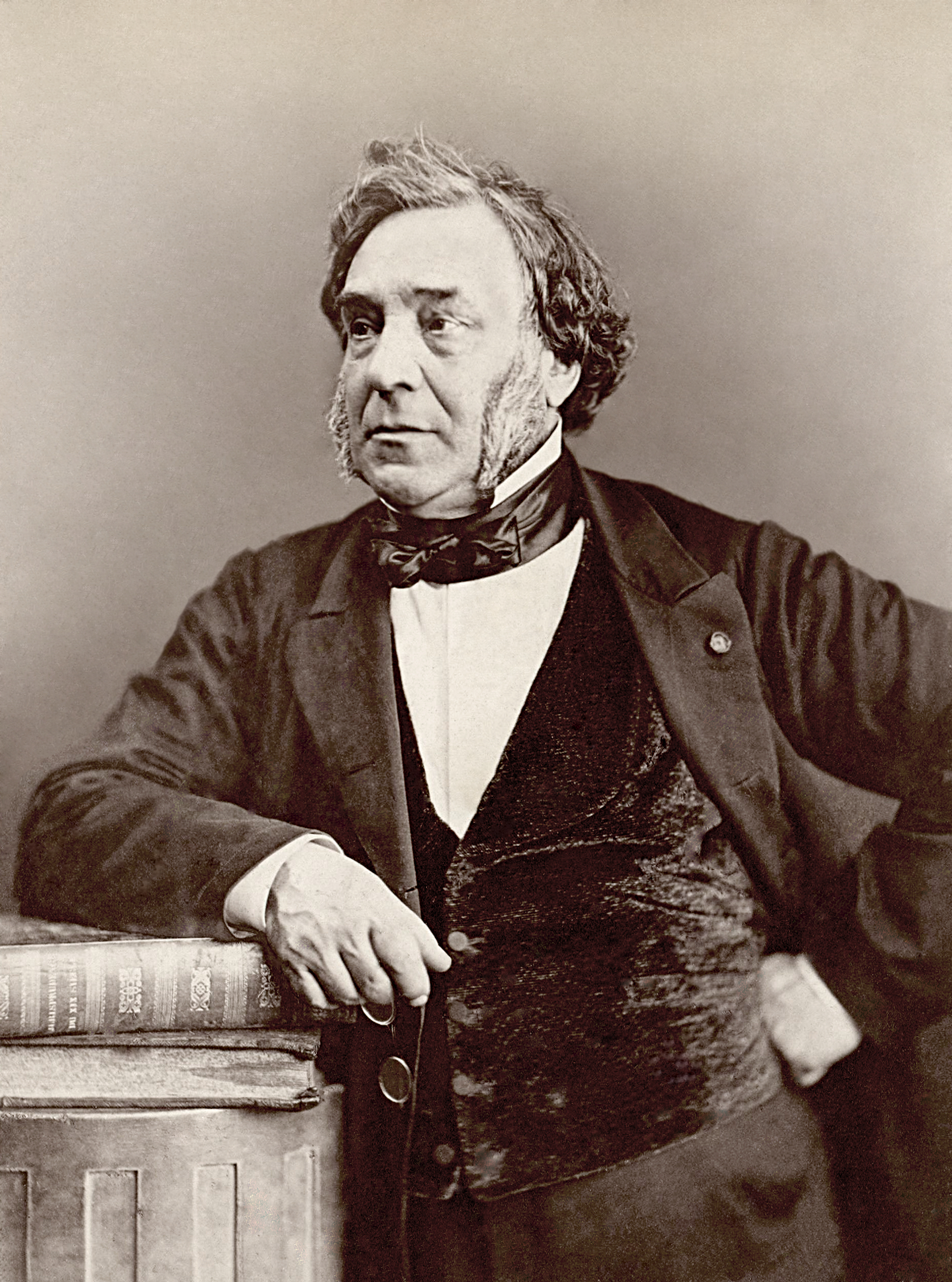
Félix-Sébastien Feuillet de Conches, by Nadar (c.1880)

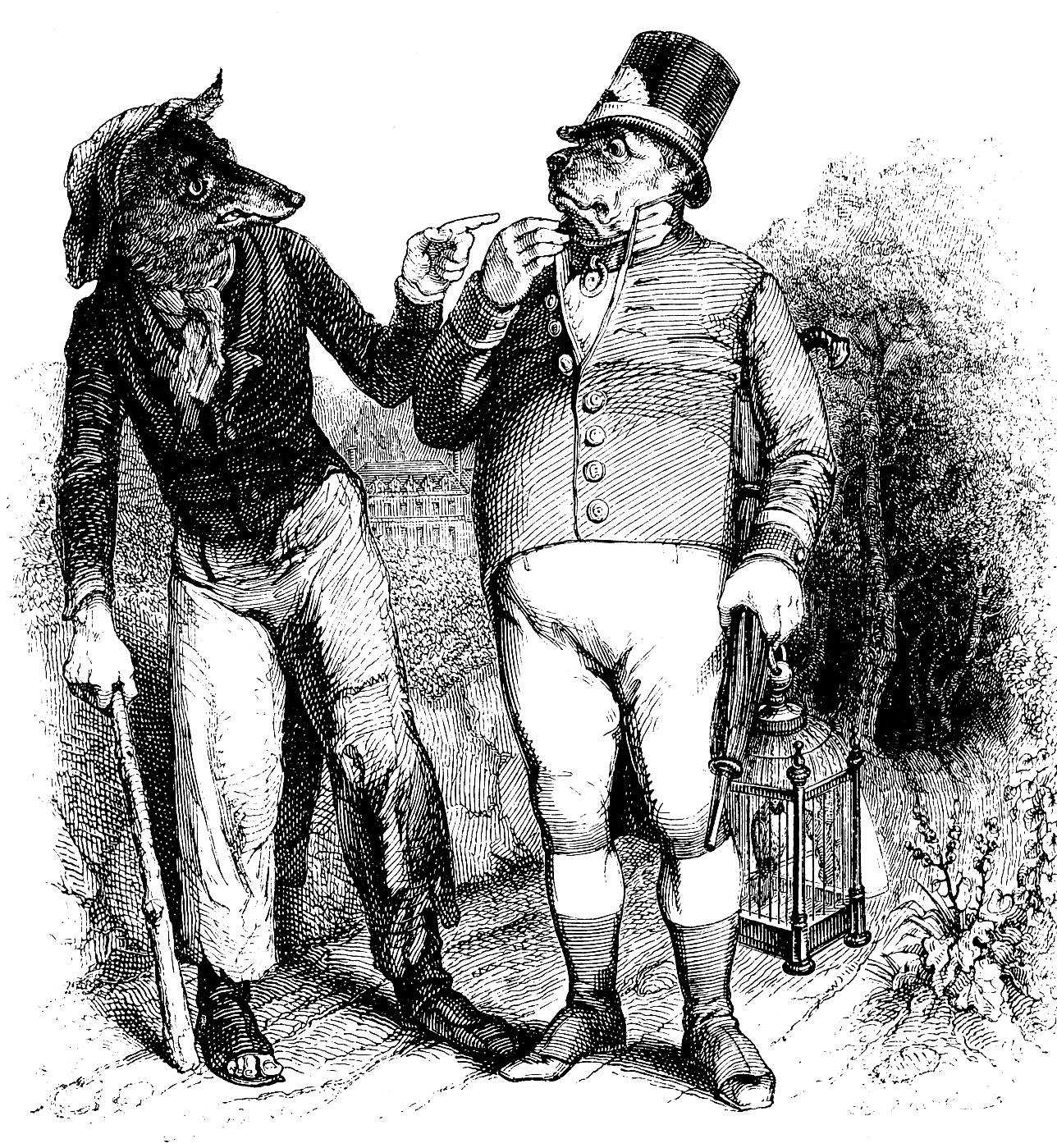
Grandville leLoup and Le Chien

Félix-Sébastien Feuillet de Conches (4 December 1798 – 5 February 1887, in Paris) was a French diplomat, journalist, writer and collector. Having occupied the posts of 'introducteur des ambassadeurs' and head of protocol at the Ministry of Foreign Affairs, he was able to form a collection specialising in English painting, 19th century French painting, the history of civilisations, the art of the Near East and the art of Asia. His contemporary Charles Monselet judged de Conches' collection as unequalled, but it included some pieces of dubious authenticity.

== Works ==
- 1846: Notice historique sur Léopold Robert ». Paris : Impr. de E. Duverger.
- 1848: Léopold Robert, sa vie, ses œuvres et sa correspondance. Paris : bureau de la Revue des deux mondes.
- 1851: Archives de l’art français :
- 1855: In collaboration with Armand Baschet, Les femmes blondes selon les peintres de l'école de Venise read online.
- 1856: Peintres européens en Chine et les Peintres Chinois. Paris : Impr. de Dubuisson.
- 1867: Revue l'amateur d'autographes N° 129 - Il écrit 1e mai 1867 la nécrologie de Jacques Charavay: "c'est une perte pour tous ceux qui s'occupent de documents historiques."
- 1862-1868: Causeries d’un curieux, variétés d’histoire et d’art tirées d’un cabinet d’autographes et de dessins. Paris : H. Plon, 4 vol.
- 28 mars 1877: Souvenirs de première jeunesse d’un curieux septuagénaire. Vichy : typographie A. Wallon.
- 15 mai 1882: Souvenirs d’un curieux octogénaire. Le Puy-en-Velay : typographie de Marchessou.
- 1882: Histoire de l’école anglaise de peinture, jusques et y compris Sir Thomas Lawrence et ses émules. Paris : Leroux.

=== Bibliography ===
- Joseph Naudet, Félix Sébastien Feuillet de Conches : Réponse de la Bibliothèque nationale à m. Feuillet de Conches read online
- Achille Jubinal : Une lettre inédite de Montaigne à Henri IV read online
- Jules Barbey d'Aurevilly : Correspondance générale, Volume 8 read online
- Mévil André. – « Les Fables de La Fontaine illustrées par les artistes de tous les pays du monde ». In L’Illustration (album de Noël), 1934.
- Lobligeois Mireille. – « Les Miniatures indiennes de la collection Feuillet de Conches », Arts asiatiques-Annales du musée national des arts asiatiques dans les Cahiers de l’École Française d’Extrême-Orient avec le Concours du C.N.R.S., t. XLVII, 1992, p. 19-28.
- La Fontaine Jean de & Imam Bakhsh Lahori. – Le Songe d’un habitant du Mogol, et autres fables de La Fontaine. Paris : Réunion des musées nationaux, Imprimerie nationale, 1995.
