= Tillières-sur-Avre =

- Commune
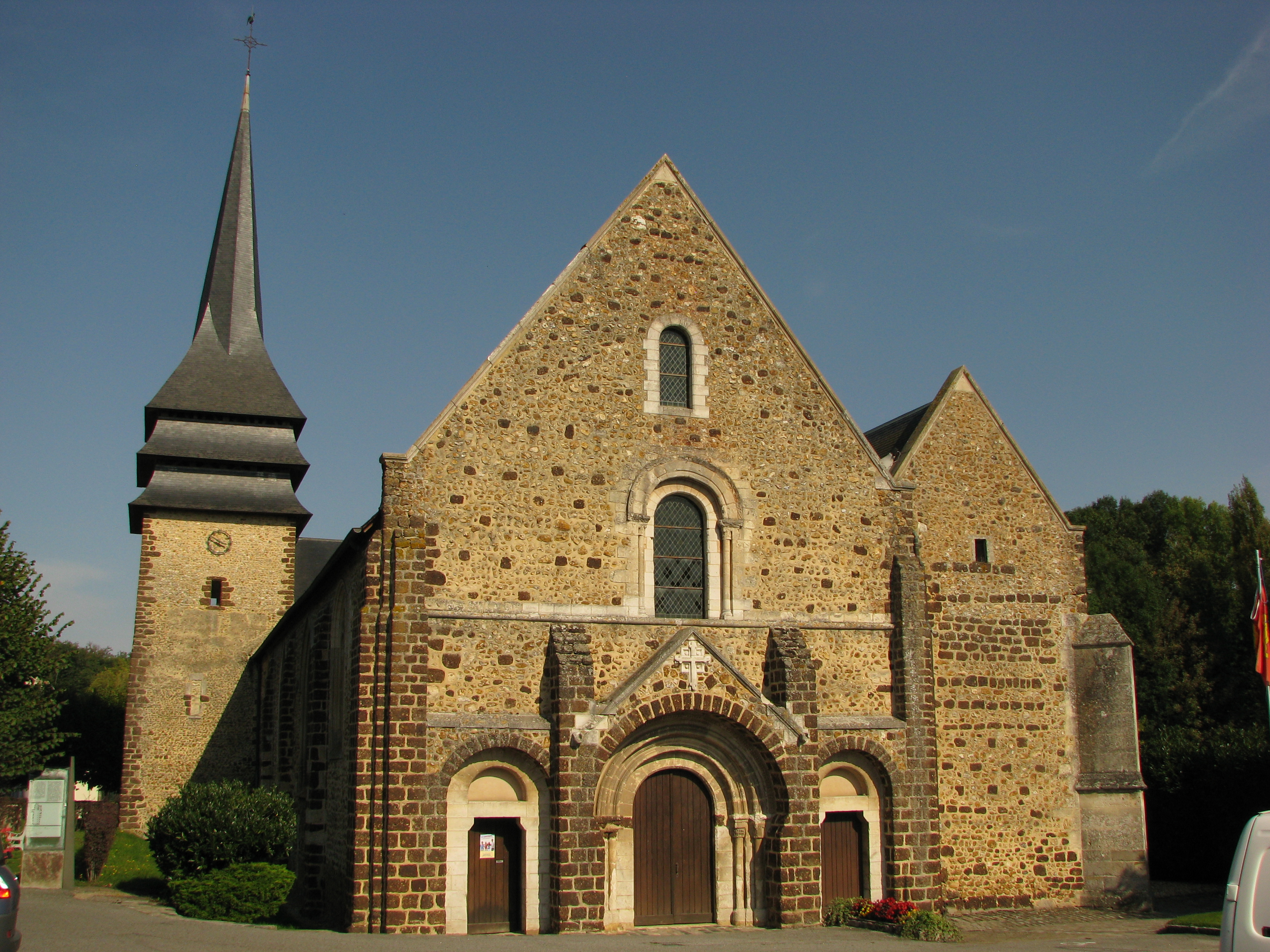
- The church in Tillières-sur-Avre

- Coat of arms
- Location of Tillières-sur-Avre
- Location within France Location within Normandy
- Coordinates: 48°45′29″N 1°03′26″E
- Country: France
- Region: Normandy
- Department: Eure
- Arrondissement: Évreux
- Canton: Verneuil d'Avre et d'Iton
- Intercommunality: CC Interco Normandie Sud Eure

Government
  - Mayor (2022–2026): Fabien Gouttefarde
- Area^{1}: 16.76 km^{2} (6.47 sq mi)
- Elevation: 134 m (440 ft)
- Highest elevation: 179 m (587 ft)
- Lowest elevation: 128 m (420 ft)
- Population (2023): 1,020
  - Density: 60.9/km^{2} (158/sq mi)
- Time zone: UTC+01:00 (CET)
  - Summer (DST): UTC+02:00 (CEST)
- INSEE/Postal code: 27643 /27570
- ^{1} French Land Register data, which excludes lakes, ponds, glaciers > 1 km^{2} (0.386 sq mi or 247 acres) and river estuaries.

Tillières-sur-Avre is a commune in the Eure department and Normandy region of northern France.

In 1013, Richard II of Normandy erected a castle on the benches of the Avre river as this region was being contested by the Norman dukes, the counts of Blois and the French kings. The custody of the castle was given to the Raoul from the house of Tosny but some time after his rebellion it was given by Robert I of Normandy to Gilbert I of the house of Crispin. Around 1041 the castle was captured from him and razed by the French king Henry I but Robert's son, William the Conqueror, rebuild the castle and invested Gilbert's son, Gilbert II, as hereditary custodian of the castle around 1058.

Around the same time, in the 11th century, its church Saint-Hilaire was built in the Romanesque style. The church was later enlarged in the 16th century and the facade significantly altered in the 19th century.

The painter Maurice Boitel was born here in 1919.

The village is twinned with that of Wendehausen in Thuringia, Germany.

== Population ==
Historical population
Year	Pop.	±% p.a.
1968	1,163	—
1975	1,267	+1.23%
1982	1,174	−1.08%
1990	1,185	+0.12%
1999	1,179	−0.06%
2007	1,206	+0.28%
2012	1,134	−1.22%
2017	1,081	−0.95%
2023	1,020	−0.96%
Source: INSEE

== See also ==
- Communes of the Eure department
