= William Robert Whatton =

British surgeon and antiquarian

William Robert Whatton FRS, FSA (17 February 1790, in Loughborough – 5 December 1835, in Portland Place) was a British surgeon and antiquarian.

He was qualified MCRS on 11 March 1810. He served at Da Graça Hospital, Lisbon, treating the wounded from the Battle of Albuera. He treated the wounded from the Siege of Ciudad Rodrigo (1812), and the Siege of Badajoz (1812).

He was appointed resident to the Poorhouse, Manchester. On 15 September 1830 he attended William Huskisson, who had been struck by a train and died. He was elected staff of the Manchester Royal Infirmary in 1833.

== Works ==
- An address to the governors of the Royal Institution of Manchester, H. Smith, 1829; Kessinger Publishing, 15 January 2009, ISBN 9781104010119
- History of the Foundations in Manchester of Christ's College, Chetham's Hospital, and the Free Grammar School, Samuel Hibbert, John Palmer, William Robert Whatton, J. Greswell, Thomas Agnew and Joseph Zanetti, 1848, ASIN: B00AYV4TBG.
- History of the County Palatine and Duchy of Lancaster. William Robert Whatton, Edward Baines, BiblioBazaar, LLC, ISBN 9781143857317
