= Roger I of Tosny =

Norman noble

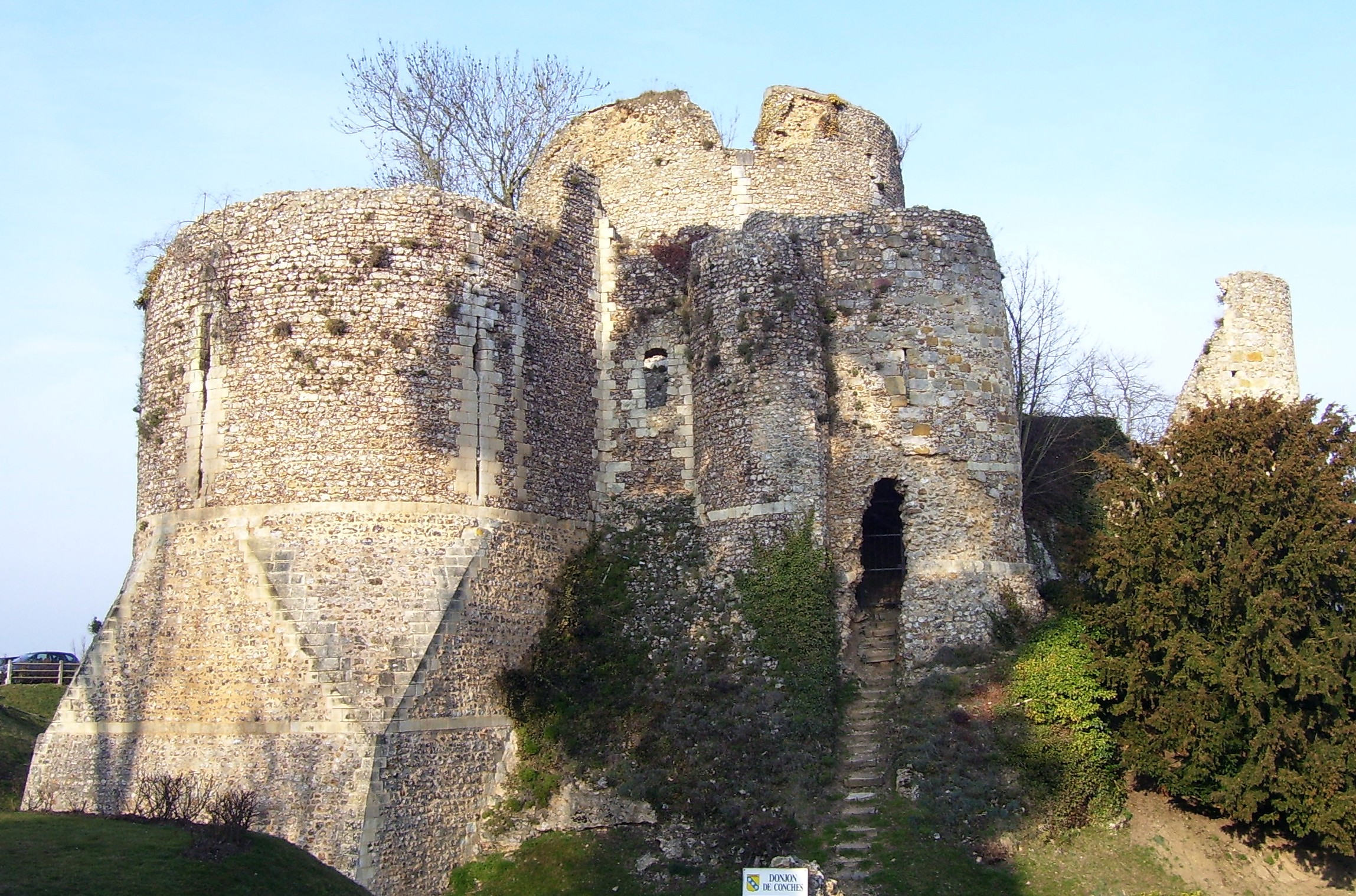
Keep (donjon) of Conches-en-Ouche, département Eure, Haute-Normandie, France. It was built in 1035 by Roger I of Tosny, and destroyed in 1591 in the French Wars of Religion.

Roger I of Tosny or Roger of Hispania (died c. 1040) was a Norman nobleman of the House of Tosny who took part in the Reconquista of Iberia.

== Career ==
Roger was the son of Raoul I of Tosny, seigneur de Conches. In 1013, Roger and his father guarded the castle at Tillières for Richard II, Duke of Normandy. A few years later, for an unknown reason, the pair were forced into exile and Tilliéres was taken from their custody (later given to Gilbert Crispin by Robert II). While his father gained a reputation for himself in Apulia, Roger did the same fighting the Muslims in Northern Iberia, where the Christian states welcomed volunteers. Roger fought for Ermesinde of Carcassonne, regent-countess of Barcelona after the death of her husband Ramon Borrell, helping her against the Muslim. Maybe Roger married Ermesinde's daughter. Adémar de Chabannes gives an echo of the more or less legendary deeds of Roger in Iberia, where he gained the nickname Mangeur de Maures (Moor-Eater). Adémar recounts that Roger took his captured Saracens each day and, in front of them, cut one of their number in two, boiling the first half and giving it to the other Muslims to eat, and pretending to take the other half into his own tent for him and his companions to eat. Then Roger allowed some of these prisoners to escape, to spread these horrific rumours.

Before 1024, Roger and his father gained permission from Richard II to return to Normandy, and Raoul died soon afterwards.

Roger de Tosny founded Conches-en-Ouche. He built its church of Sainte-Foy (before 1026) then the abbey of Saint-Pierre de Castillon (c. 1035), where monks from Fécamp Abbey were installed. This monastery was one of the first baronial foundations in Normandy, and its foundation charter reveals that the lord of Tosny gave it possessions around Conches, Tosny on the Seine and on the rivers Eure, Charentonne, Eaulne and Béthune.

In 1035, Robert I's death began a troubled period in the duchy of Normandy. Civil wars multiplied and Roger was an active participant in them. According to Orderic Vitalis Roger refused to serve the new duke, William II, because he was of illegitimate birth. However, according to David Bates, he simply used the opportunity to settle scores with some neighbours. He took advantage of the new Duke's weakness by ravaging the lands of Humphrey of Vieilles. Around 1040, Roger and his two eldest sons (Helbert and Elinand) and his ally Robert I de Grandmesnil died in battle against Roger I de Beaumont, Humphrey's son.

Peace was re-established between the Tosny family and the neighbouring families. Roger´s widow Gotelina/Godehildis married Richard, Count of Évreux, Robert of Grandmesnil’s widow was married to William of Evreux, brother of Richard, and Adelize (Roger's daughter) married William FitzOsbern.

== Family and descendants ==
Only one wife of Roger of Tosny is known by name, his widow, Godehildis (or Adelaide), who married Richard, Count of Évreux after Roger's death. It is unclear if she was his only wife. Children:

- Helbert of Tosny, died in 1040, with his father.
- Helinand of Tosny, died in 1040, with his father.
- Vuazo of Tosny
- Raoul II of Tosny, successor of his father.
- Robert of Tosny, Lord of Stafford
- Béranger l'Espagnol of Tosny
- Adelise of Tosny, married William FitzOsbern.
- Berthe of Tosny, married Guy de Laval.

== Bibliography ==
- Boissonnade, P. (1934). "Les premières croisades françaises en Espagne: Normands, Gascons, Aquitains et Bourguignons (1018–1032)". Bulletin Hispanique. 36 (1): 5–28. doi:10.3406/hispa.1934.2607.
- Cokayne, G. E., The Complete Peerage; or, A history of the House of Lords and all its Members from the Earliest Times, ed. Geoffrey H. White, Vol. XII/1 (London: St. Catherine Press, 1953)
- Douglas, David C., William the Conqueror (Berkeley; Los Angeles, University of California Press, 1964)
- (in French) Musset, Lucien, "Aux origines d'une classe dirigeante : les Tosny, grands barons normands du Xe au XIIe siècle", Sonderdruck aus Francia Forschungen zur westeuropäischen Geschichte, Munich, 1978, pp. 45–80
- Schwennicke, Detlev, Europäische Stammtafeln: Stammtafeln zur Geschichte der Europäischen Staaten, Neue Folge, Band II (Marburg, Germany: J. A. Stargardt, 1984)
- van Houts, Elisabeth (ed. and trans.) The Normans in Europe, (Manchester: Manchester University Press, 2000) (Also see online extracts on Google Books)
- Villegas-Aristizabal, Lucas, "Algunas notas sobre la participación de Rogelio de Tosny en la Reconquista Ibérica", Estudios Humanísticos de la Universidad de Leon, III, 2004, pp. 263–74. http://dialnet.unirioja.es/servlet/articulo?codigo=1078914
- Villegas-Aristizabal, Lucas, "Roger of Tosny's adventures in the County of Barcelona", Nottingham Medieval Studies LII, 2008, pp. 5–16. https://www.brepolsonline.net/doi/abs/10.1484/J.NMS.3.426
