= Laghetto delle Conche =

Lake on the island of Elba, Italy

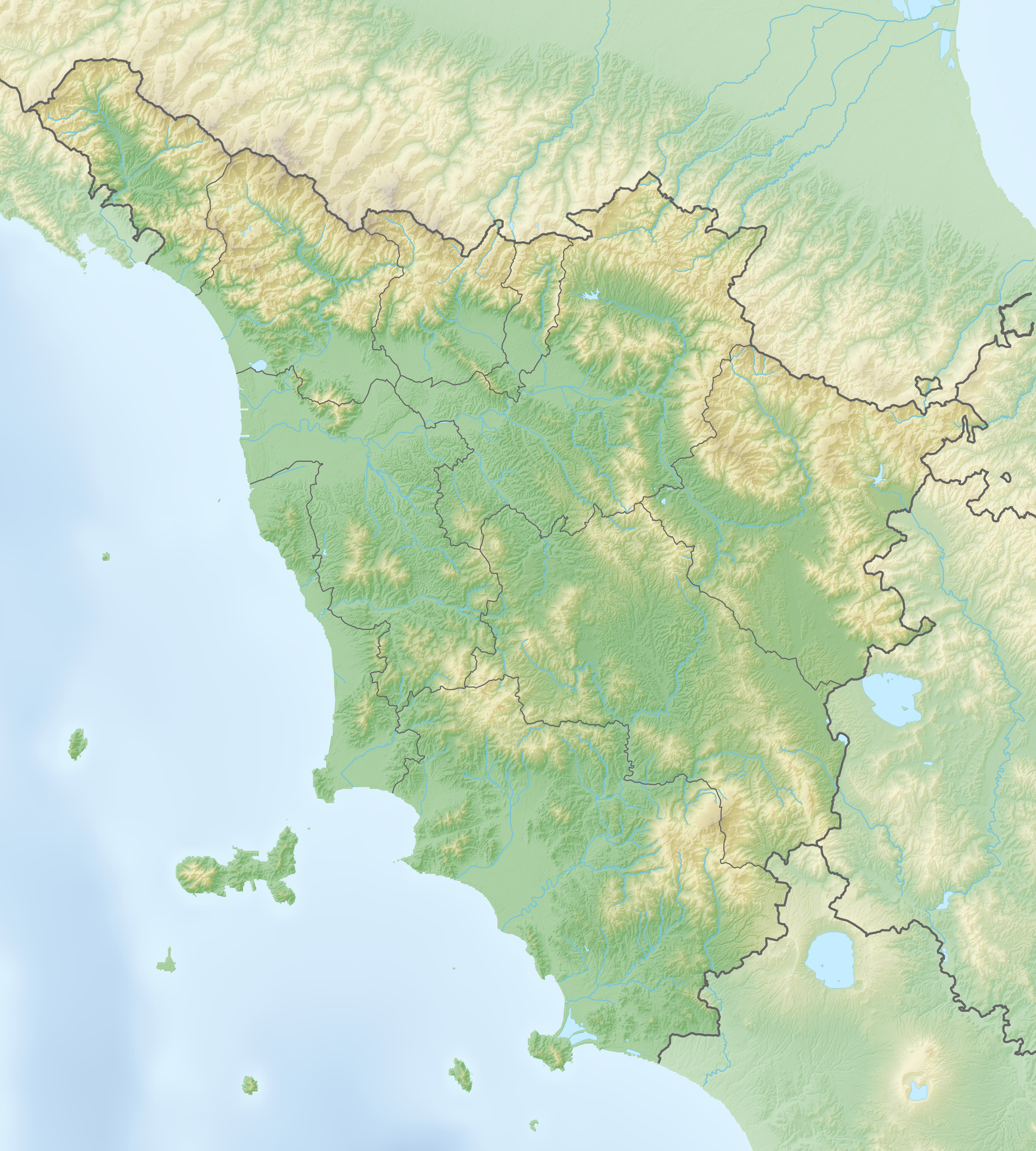
- Location within Tuscany
- Location: Elba, Province of Livorno, Tuscany
- Coordinates: 42°50′20″N 10°25′24″E
- Basin countries: Italy

Laghetto delle Conche is a lake on the island of Elba, Italy. The island is part of the Province of Livorno, Tuscany.
