= Victor-Amédée Barbié du Bocage =

French geographer

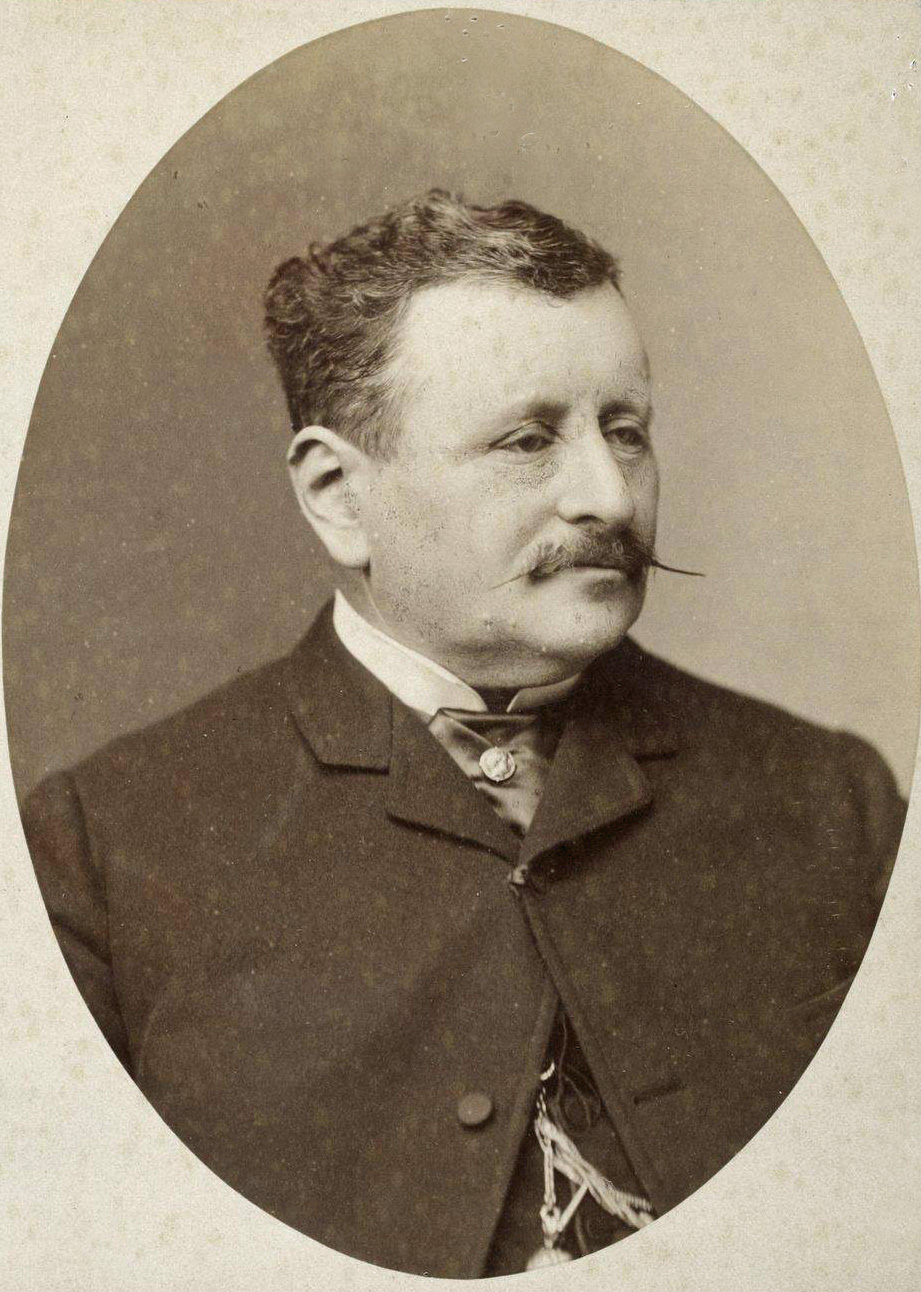
Amédée Victor Louis Barbier du Bocage

Victor-Amédée Barbié du Bocage (28 January 1832 – 11 October 1890) was a French geographer. He was appointed Knight of the Legion of Honour in 1866.
