= Conch house =

House style in Florida, US

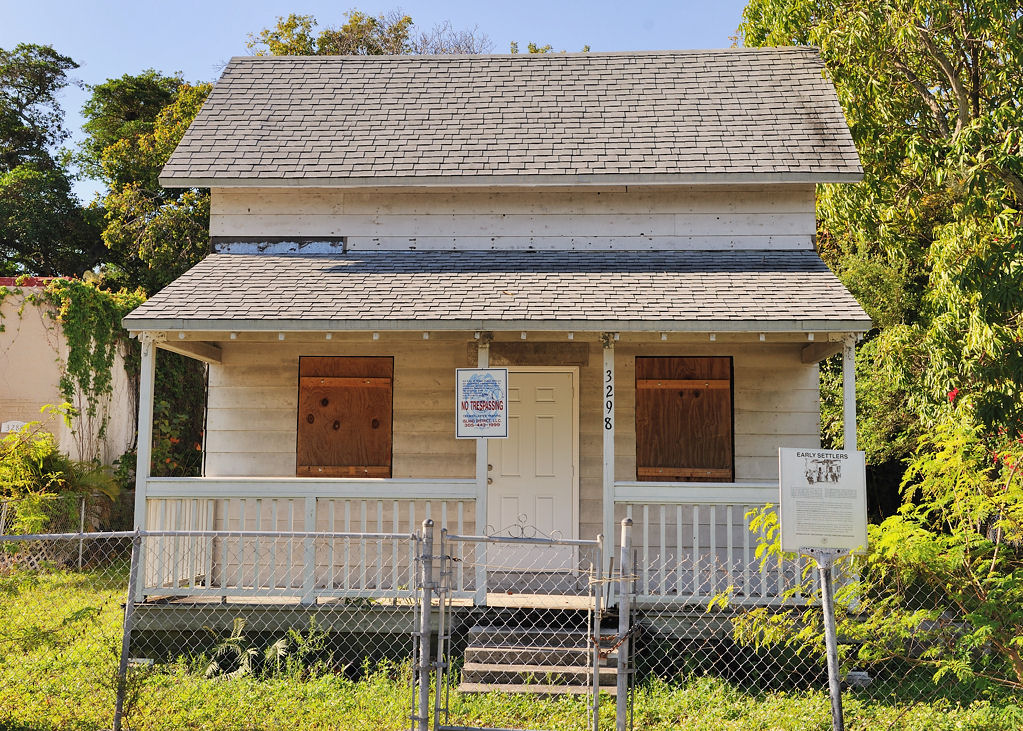
Mariah Brown House in Coconut Grove - Miami

A conch house is a style of architecture that developed in Key West, Florida in the 19th century and used into the early 20th century. The style was also used in the other keys and in the Miami area. The introduction of the conch house style is attributed to immigrants from the Bahamas.

== Characteristics ==
The conch house, like other Florida vernacular architecture styles, is built of wood, and set on posts or piers, which allows air to circulate via cross ventilation under the floor. Conch houses are rectangular, of one or two floors, and usually have a porch across the full width of the front of the house (both floors if the house has two floors). Other characteristics are horizontal weatherboarding or clapboarding, low gabled or hip roofs, and double-hung sash windows. Roofs may be metal or shingled. Conch house designs were often influenced by Classical Revival or Neoclassical architecture. Other than carved brackets and/or rafter ends on porches, conch houses generally lack ornamentation.

== History ==
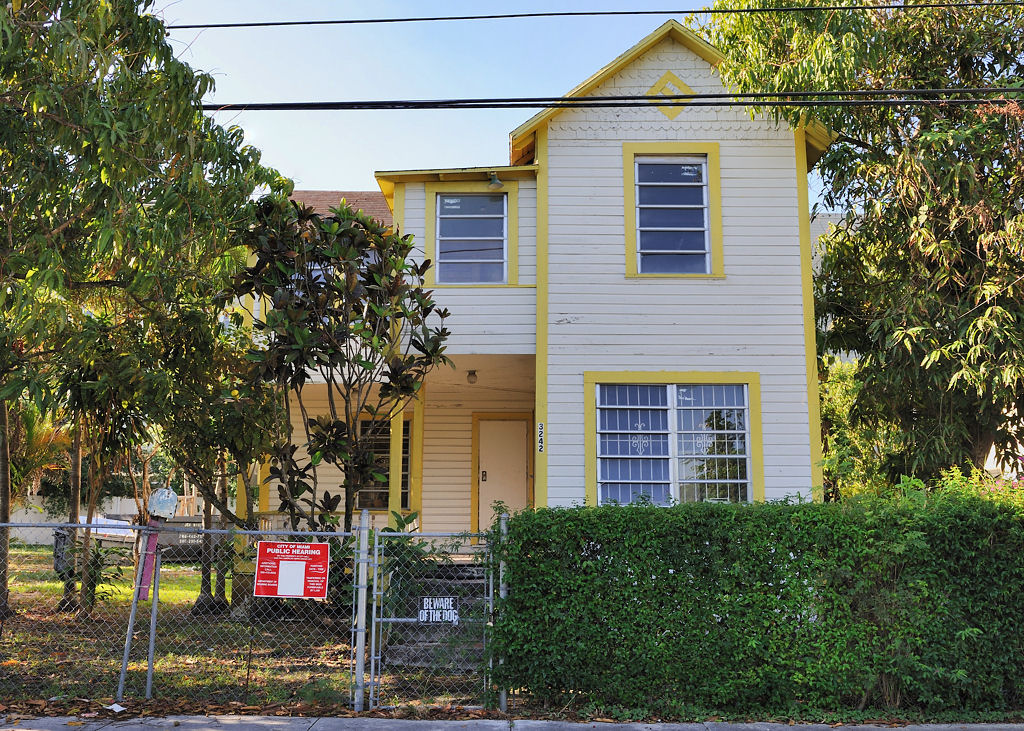
Stirrup House in Coconut Grove - Miami

The conch house style was developed in Key West by Bahamian immigrants, known as "Conchs". Many Bahamians had experience building boats, and the earliest conch houses were built like boats, using timber framing. In the 1880s timber framing was replaced with balloon framing. Houses in the conch style were also built in Miami, in particular, in the Coconut Grove and Overtown neighborhoods. The term "conch house" has been applied to houses built in a variety of styles in Key West, but the most common usage is for houses built in a Bahamian style. About half of the historic houses in Key West have been classified as being in the Classical Revival style. The Bahamian immigrants in Key West were accustomed to building houses in the Bahamian clapboard house style. This style placed houses on posts or piers, used timber framing, had large windows and high ceilings to allow cooling by available breezes, and had louvered shutters hinged at the top ("Bahamas shutters"). The Bahamian clapboard house style has influenced housing in many areas with tropical climates.
