= Conch (people) =

Slang term for ethnic group

Conch (/ˈkɒŋk/) was originally a slang term for Bahamians of European descent.

== Theories of the name ==
After the American Revolution, many loyalists migrated to the Bahamas. Some of the loyalists looked down on the original white Bahamians and called them Conchs, possibly because shellfish was a prominent part of their diet.

Some other theories that have been proposed for the origin of the term are:

- The Bahamians told the British authorities that they would "eat conch" before paying taxes levied by the Crown.
- The adventurers from St. Augustine, Florida (then part of British East Florida) who recaptured Nassau from the Spanish in 1782 hoisted a flag with a shell rampant on a field of canvas.
- The first regiment of militia in Nassau adopted a regimental flag with a gold conch shell on a blue field.

== Use in Florida ==
=== Florida Keys ===
By extension, the term Conch has also been applied to the descendants of Bahamian immigrants in Florida. Bahamians began visiting the Florida Keys in the 18th century to catch turtles, cut timber, and salvage wrecks. During the 19th century and the first half of the 20th century, most of the permanent residents in the Florida Keys outside of Key West, and many in Key West, were Bahamian in origin. Conch was reported to be a term of distinction for Bahamians in Key West in the 1880s.

The white Bahamians in the keys continued to be known as Conchs. The 1939 WPA Guide to Florida (Note: Originally called A Guide to the Southernmost State.) produced by the Works Progress Administration (WPA) noted that both Conchs and black Bahamians in Key West spoke with a "Cockney accent". Other residents of the Florida Keys, especially in Key West, began calling themselves Conchs, and the term is now applied generally to persons born in Key West. The term is also used for the Conch Republic. To distinguish between natives and non-natives, the terms "Salt Water Conch" (native) and "Fresh Water Conch" (non-native) have been used. Newcomers become "Fresh Water Conchs" after seven years.

=== Elsewhere in Florida ===
Riviera Beach, Florida, was known as "Conchtown" in the first half of the 20th century because of the number of Bahamian immigrants who settled there. Unlike the situation in Key West and the rest of the Florida Keys, where being Conch became a matter of pride and community identification, Conch was used by outsiders (in particular the residents of West Palm Beach) in a pejorative manner to describe the Bahamian community in Riviera Beach. The usage there also carried the connotation that at least some of the Conchs were of mixed racial heritage. As a result, some of the Bahamians in Riviera Beach denied being Conchs when interviewed by the Works Progress Administration (WPA) Florida Writers Project in the late 1930s. WPA worker Veronica Huss (with assistance from Stetson Kennedy) and photographer Charles Foster wrote a book on the Conchs and their culture entitled Conch Town, but the WPA chose not to publish it (Foster eventually published an edited version in 1991). Many Bahamians also settled in Miami, particularly in the Coconut Grove neighborhood, and in Tarpon Springs.

== Other uses ==
The term Conchy Joe or Conky Joe can be a pejorative or affectionate term used to refer to a native Bahamian of primarily European descent.

== See also ==
- Conch house, an architectural style derived from Bahamian and other traditions

== Sources ==
- Foster, Charles C. (1991). Conchtown USA, with Folk songs & tales collected by Veonica Huss. Boca Raton, Florida: Florida Atlantic University Press. ISBN 0-8130-1042-X.
- Harriman, Stephen (January 22, 1995). "Speaking the Conch Lingo in Key West". Virginian-Pilot. p. E4.
- Kennedy, Stetson (2008). Grits & Grunts: Folkloric Key West. Sarasota, Florida: Pineapple Press, Inc. ISBN 978-1-56164-419-3.
- Sunshine, Sylvia (1886). Petals Plucked from Sunny Climes. Nashville, Tennessee: Southern Methodist Publishing House.
