= Hugh III, Archbishop of Rouen =

Norman bishop

Hugh III, also known as Hugh of Saint-Denis, was archbishop of Rouen from 942 to 989. As archbishop, he was also the titular abbot of Saint-Ouen. Very little is known about his early life, except that he was a monk from Saint-Denis when chosen by William Longsword. He was heavily criticized by later chroniclers, who mention his inability to resist temptations of the flesh and his spoliation of cathedral property.

His arrival to Rouen coincided with the assassination of William by Arnulf of Flanders, and was followed by the minority of Duke Richard I. He developed an excellent relation with the Duke, attested by his right to strike money, the Duke's donations to his alma mater St. Denis and numerous donations by the Duke's family to the cathedral.

In 966, Hugh assisted Richard in the reformation of the canons of Mont-Saint Michel into a regular Benedictine community. He also acquired a copy of the Vita of St. Romanus, Rouen's main saint, from Gerard de Brogne, and established the cults of St. Lo of Coutances and St. Taurin of Évreux.

Among his alienation of church property, it is of particular importance his donation of lands around Tosny to his brother Ralph, which marks the beginning of the House of Tosny. He also alienated the domain of Douvrend to his brother-in-law Odo.
