= Malahulc =

Malahulc was claimed as ancestor by the 11th-century Norman noble family of Tosny, who said he was an uncle of Rollo of Normandy, the 10th-century founder and first ruler of the principality now known as Normandy. They are said by the chronicler Orderic Vitalis to have raised this claim to contrast this legitimate descent with the illegitimate birth of William the Conqueror. William of Jumièges describes Roger de Tosny as "de stirpe Malahulcii, qui Rollonis patruus fuerat, et cum eo Francos atterens, Normanniam fortiter acquisierat," that is, he was of the stock of Malahulc, Rollo's uncle, and fought the French bravely in the conquest of Normandy. The nature of the claimed descent is unknown, and it may have been a total fabrication intended to disguise the Tosny family's French origin, or their ecclesiastical origin.

By the 19th century, Malahulc had been assigned multiple children, ancestors of other Norman families.
