= Conches-en-Ouche =

- Commune
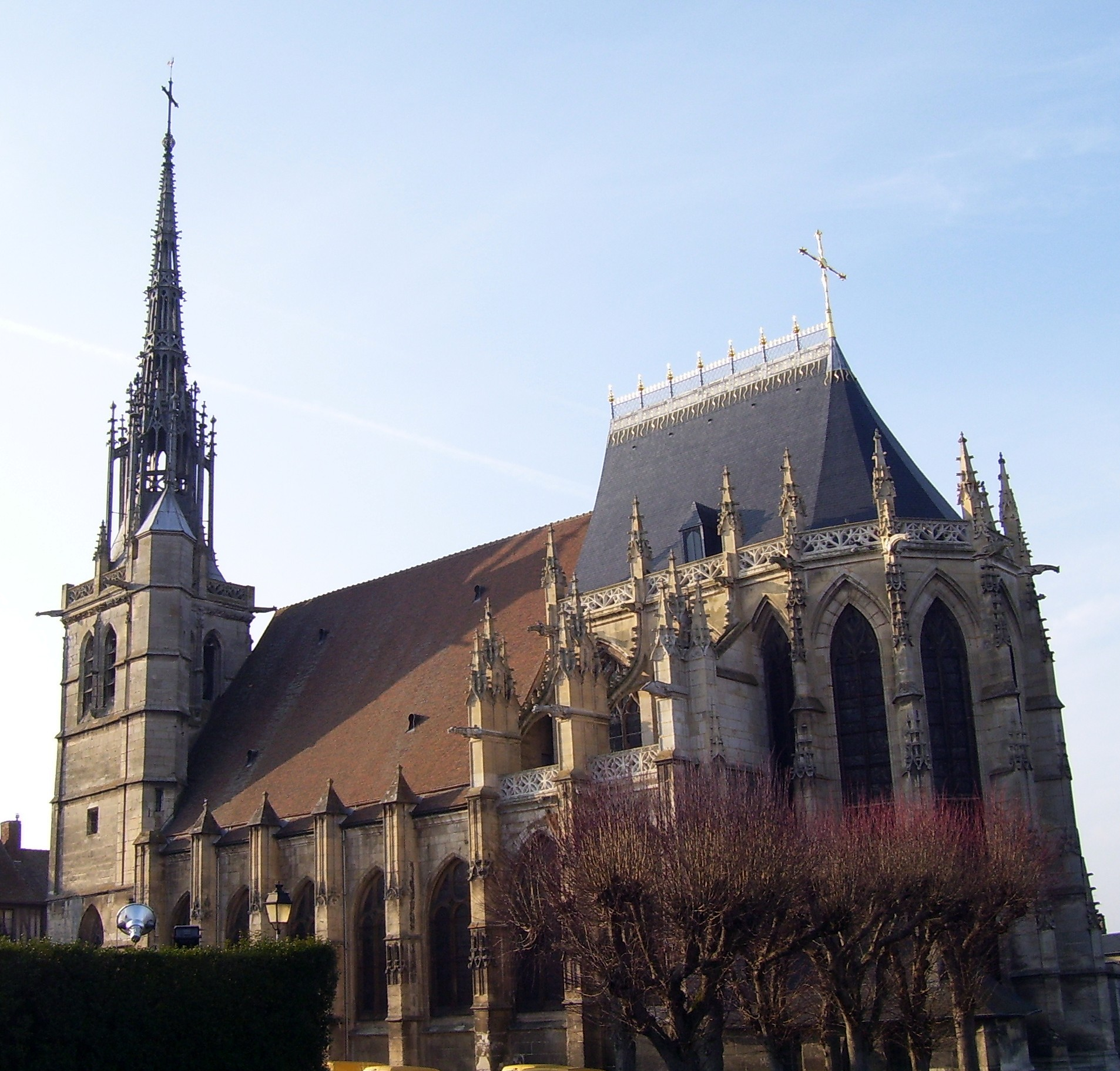
- Church of St Faith (l'Église Sainte-Foy)

- Flag Coat of arms
- Location of Conches-en-Ouche
- Location within France Location within Normandy
- Coordinates: 48°57′41″N 0°56′36″E
- Country: France
- Region: Normandy
- Department: Eure
- Arrondissement: Évreux
- Canton: Conches-en-Ouche
- Intercommunality: Pays de Conches

Government
  - Mayor (2020–2026): Jérôme Pasco
- Area^{1}: 16.72 km^{2} (6.46 sq mi)
- Elevation: 123 m (404 ft)
- Highest elevation: 173 m (568 ft)
- Lowest elevation: 100 m (330 ft)
- Population (2023): 4,838
  - Density: 289.4/km^{2} (749.4/sq mi)
- Time zone: UTC+01:00 (CET)
  - Summer (DST): UTC+02:00 (CEST)
- INSEE/Postal code: 27165 /27190
- ^{1} French Land Register data, which excludes lakes, ponds, glaciers > 1 km^{2} (0.386 sq mi or 247 acres) and river estuaries.

Conches-en-Ouche (French pronunciation: [kɔ̃ʃ ɑ̃.n‿uʃ], literally Conches in Ouche) is a commune in the Eure département in northern France.

== Geography ==
It is located by the Rouloir river, southwest of Évreux in the Normandy region. The town is located on a plateau known as the Pays d'Ouche.

== Population ==
Historical population
Year	Pop.	±% p.a.
1968	3,534	—
1975	3,785	+0.99%
1982	3,854	+0.26%
1990	4,009	+0.49%
1999	4,280	+0.73%
2007	5,046	+2.08%
2012	4,994	−0.21%
2017	5,030	+0.14%
2023	4,838	−0.65%
Source: INSEE

== Sights and monuments ==
- Château de Conches-en-Ouche, ruins of 11th-century castle
- Church of St Faith (l'Église Sainte-Foy)
- Abbaye Saint-Pierre et Saint-Paul de Châtillon-lès-Conches
- Arboretum
- Folk museum

== Personalities linked to the commune ==
- William of Conches, medieval grammarian, philosopher and theologian of the School of Chartres.
- Diderot set an episode of Jacques le fataliste et son maître (1773/1775) in Conches.
- Victor-Amédée Barbié du Bocage (1832–1890), renowned geographer and essayist, died in the Château de Quenet on 11 October 1890.
- Paul Collin (1843–1915), writer and librettist, was born here.
- François Décorchemont (1880–1971), master glassmaker who made the windows of numerous churches in the Eure and the Church of Sainte-Odile in Paris was born and died in Conches.
- Alfred Recours, mayor of the town since 1984 and a former deputy for l'Eure.
- Roger de Tosny I, medieval knight known as the Moor Eater

== International relations ==
Conches-en-Ouche is twinned with:

- Rhodes, Greece
- Człuchów, Poland
- Wareham, United Kingdom
- Aulendorf, Germany

== See also ==
- Communes of the Eure department

== Gallery ==
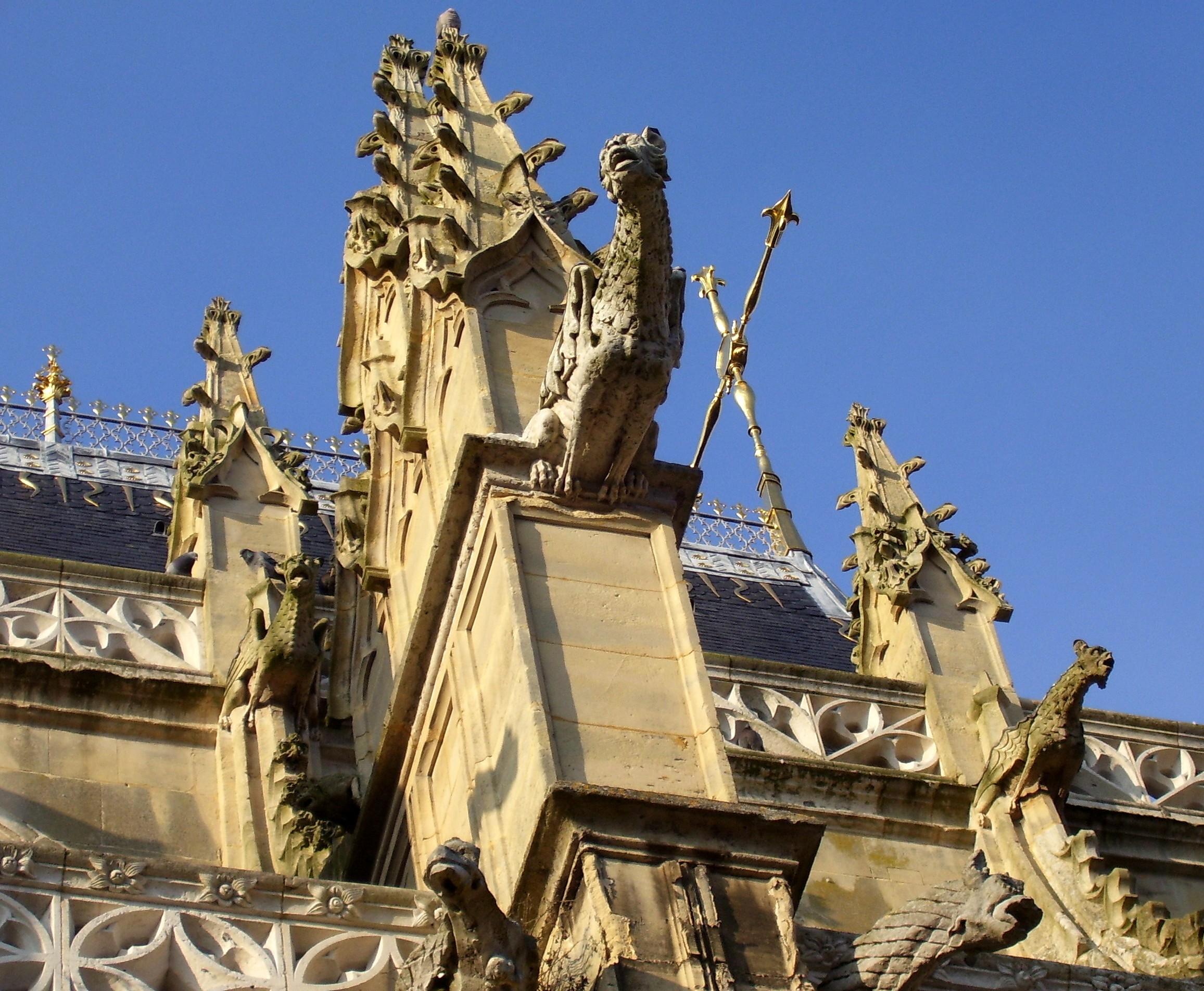
Gargoyles on Sainte-Foy

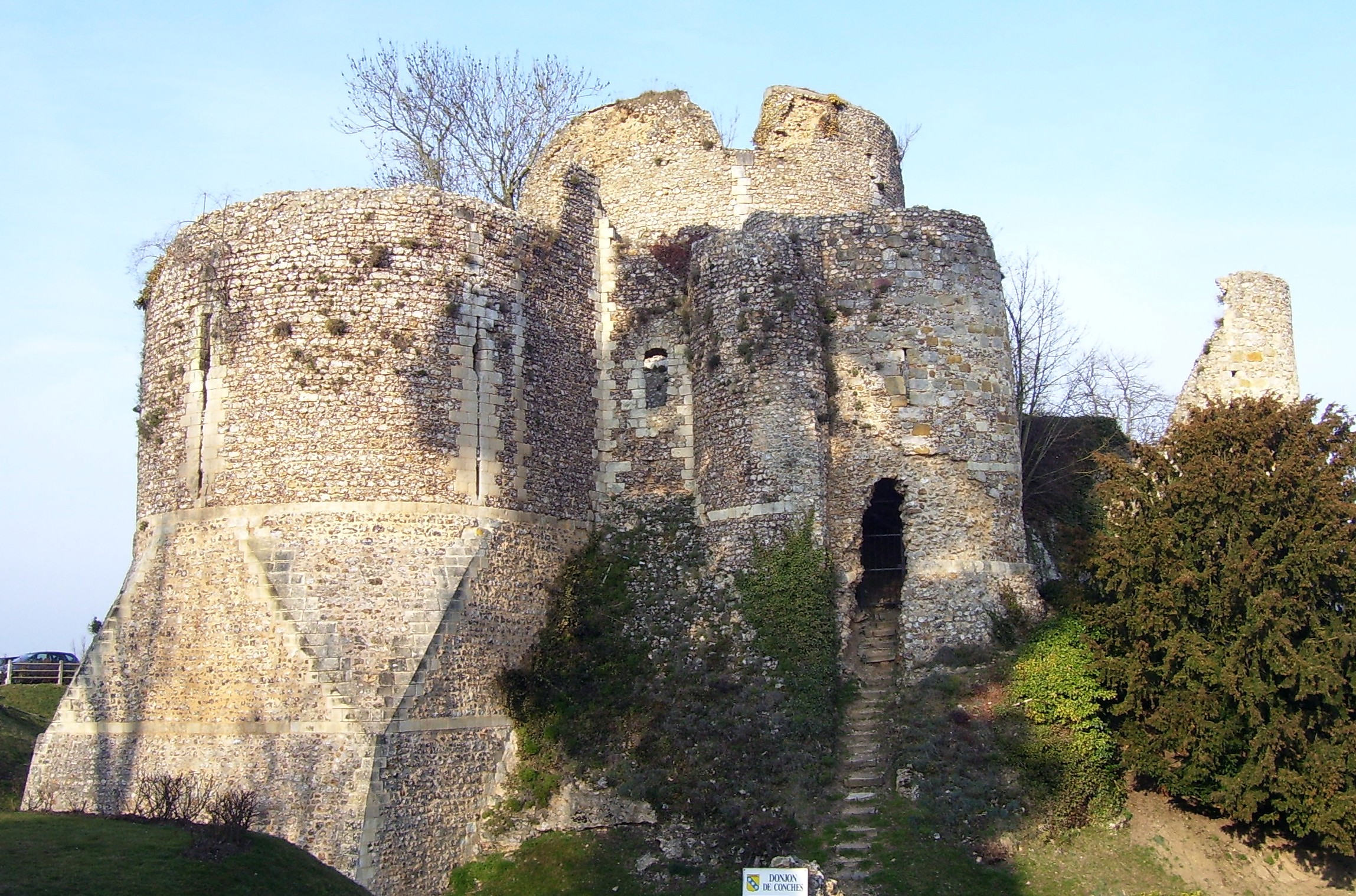
Keep (donjon) built 1035 by Roger I of Tosny and destroyed 1591 in the French Wars of Religion

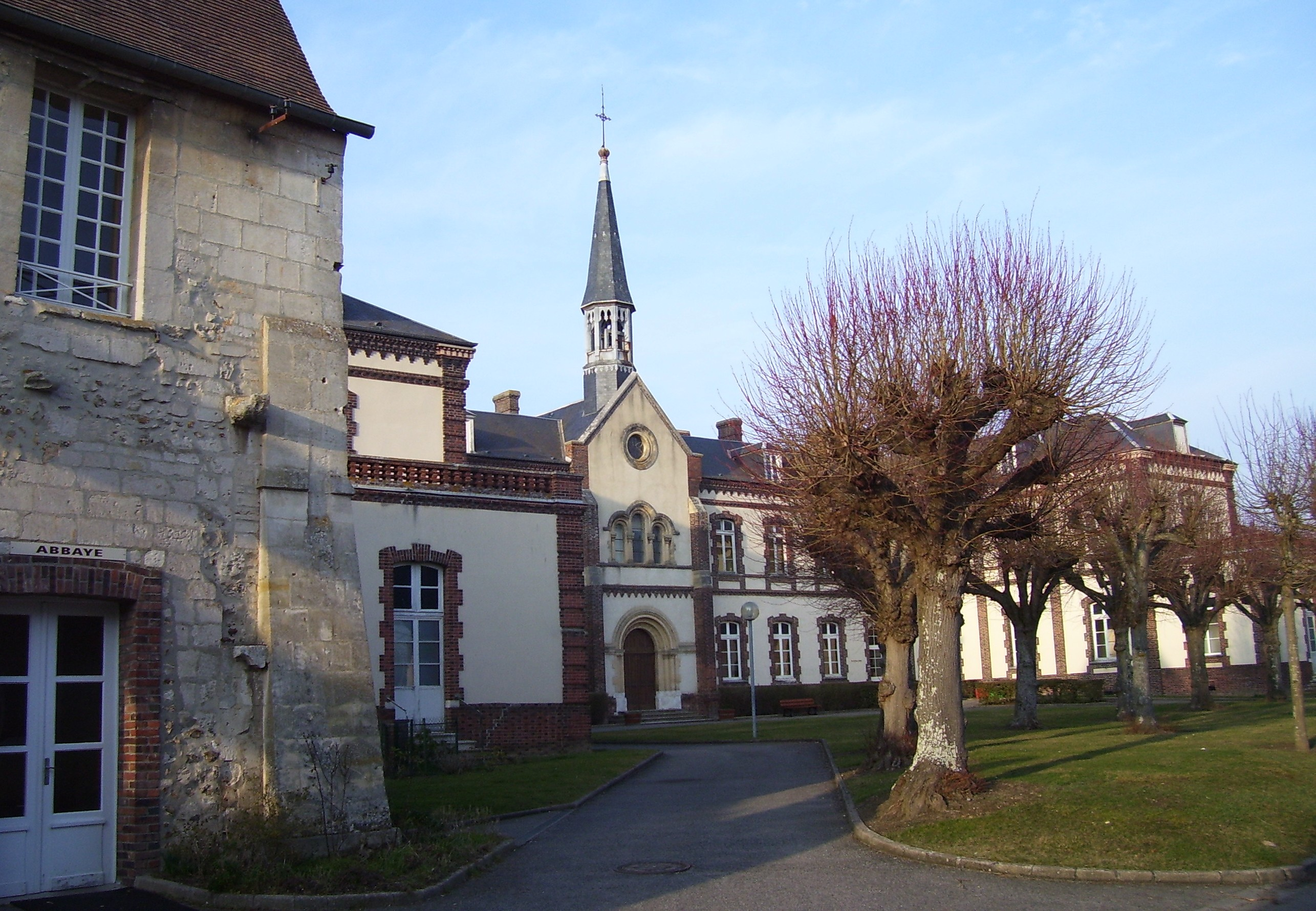
Abbey (11th century) and hospital
