= House of Beaumont =

Anglo-Norman noble family

Beaumont de Beaumont
- Noble Family
- Country: Normandy, France
- Current region: France
- Origin: Beaumont-le-Roger
- Founder: Humphrey de Vieilles, Roger de Beaumont
- Titles: Count of Meulan; Earl of Leicester; Earl of Warwick; Earl of Worcester

The House of Beaumont was one of the great Anglo-Norman baronial noble families, who became rooted in England after the Norman Conquest.

== History ==
Roger de Beaumont, Lord (seigneur) of Pont-Audemer, of Beaumont-le-Roger, of Brionne and of Vatteville, was too old to fight at the battle of Hastings and stayed in Normandy to govern and protect it while William was away on the invasion. As a reward, he received lands in Leicestershire. His son Robert de Beaumont, comte de Meulan, who commanded the Norman right wing at Hastings, became the first Earl of Leicester. His brother Henri de Beaumont was created Earl of Warwick.

During Stephen's reign, the twins Galéran and Robert were powerful allies to the king, and as a reward Galéran (already comte de Meulan) was made Earl of Worcester.

Counsel from the Beaumonts was important to the Dukes of Normandy, then by the kings of England.

== Family tree ==
?
└─>Torf le Riche, seigneur de Pont-Audemer (born c. 910)
   │
   └─>Turold de Pont-Audemer (c. 940)
      │
      └─>Onfroi de Vieilles called de Harcourt (c. 975)
         │
         └─>Roger de Beaumont (le Barbu) (†1094)
            │
            ├─>Robert de Beaumont, 1st Earl of Leicester (1050 –1118)
            │  │
            │  ├─>Galéran IV de Meulan (1104 – 1166)
            │  │  └─> Earls of Worcester branch
            │  │
            │  └─>Robert II de Beaumont (1104 – 1168)
            │     └─> Earls of Leicester branch
            │
            └─>Henri de Beaumont called de NeufBourg (1046 – 1123)
               │└─> Earls of Warwick branch                                                                                                                   .              │                                                                                                                                           .              └─>Robert de Neubourg

Family tree: House of Beaumont

Roger de Beaumont (c.1015–1094)
EARL OF LEICESTER, 1107	Earls of Warwick
Robert de Beaumont, 1st Earl of Leicester (†1118)
Earl of Worcester	Earl of Bedford
Robert de Beaumont, 2nd Earl of Leicester (1104–1168)
Hawise de Beaumont m. William Fitz Robert, 2nd Earl of Gloucester	Robert de Beaumont, 3rd Earl of Leicester (†1190)
Robert de Beaumont, 4th Earl of Leicester (†1204)	Amicia de Beaumont m. Simon de Montfort
King John (1166–r.1199–1216)	Simon de Montfort, 5th Earl of Leicester (c.1175–1218)
m(1) Isabella, Countess of Gloucester
King Henry III (1207–r.1216–1272)	Eleanor of England m.	Simon de Montfort, 6th Earl of Leicester (c.1208–1265)
EARL OF LEICESTER, 1265
King Edward I (1239–r.1272–1307)	Edmund Crouchback, 1st Earl of Leicester and Lancaster (1245–1296)
King Edward II (1284–r.1307–1327)	Thomas of Lancaster, 2nd Earl of Leicester and Lancaster (1278–1322)	Henry of Lancaster, 3rd Earl of Leicester and Lancaster (1281–1345)

== Earls of Leicester (1107-1204) ==
Arms of Beaumont, Earls of Leicester (1st Creation): Gules, a Cinquefoil Ermine, which were adopted by the town of Leicester

- Robert de Beaumont, 1st Earl of Leicester (died 1118)
- Robert de Beaumont, 2nd Earl of Leicester (1104–1168)
- Robert de Beaumont, 3rd Earl of Leicester (died 1190)
- Robert de Beaumont, 4th Earl of Leicester (died 1204) (alias Robert FitzPernel)

== Early members of the house of Beaumont ==
=== Anglo-Norman branch ===
- Roger de Beaumont
- Robert de Beaumont, 1st Earl of Leicester
- Waleran de Beaumont, 1st Earl of Worcester
- Henry de Beaumont, 1st Earl of Warwick

=== French branch ===
The French Vicomtes de Beaumont au Maine date from approximately 930 AD and contrary to many false assumptions never had, and do not have, any connection with the Norman Beaumonts descended from Roger de Beaumont. The French family take their name from the village of Beaumont-sur-Sarthe (formerly Beaumont le Vicomte) which is 30 km (19 mi) north of Le Mans. (Beaumont-le-Roger is about 125 km (78 mi) away, in the vicinity of Rouen). The French family came to England in the late 14th century (see Isabella de Vesci) and modern Beaumonts are descended from her brother Henry de Beaumont who was the first of the English barony and later Viscounts. They are not a branch of the Norman family – rather they fought against the Normans on behalf of the French (see Hubert de Beaumont).

- Henry de Beaumont
- Hubert de Beaumont-au-Maine

== Armorial ==
The Beaumont family was founded before heraldry (c. 1160). So, different branches of the family adopted different arms.

Arms of Beaumont, Earls of Leicester (1st Creation): Gules, a Cinquefoil Ermine, which were adopted by the town of Leicester

Arms of Newburgh/Beaumont Earls of Warwick, adopted c. 1200 – 1215 at start of the age of heraldry: Checky azure and or a chevron ermine

== See also ==
- Earl of Leicester
- Earl of Warwick
- Earl of Worcester
