= Robert of Meulan =

Robert of Meulan may refer to:

- Robert I of Meulan, better known as Robert de Beaumont, 1st Earl of Leicester (died 1118)
- Robert II of Meulan (died 1204)
