= Turold de Pont-Audemer =

Turold, also Thorold or Touroude, Sire de Pont-Audemer / de Ponteaudemer (born c. 950 A.D.) was a Norman aristocrat in Normandy that is today a region of France.

The son of Torf, he inherited the title of Seigneur du Pontautou (Pont-Authou), de Torville (Tourville), Torcy (in Normandy) and Torny (Tourny). He became Sire de Pont-Audemer, he made it his main residence.

Turold married Duvelina, younger sister of Gunnor, the wife of Richard I of Normandy. By his marriage, he enhanced his position in Norman nobility and became a prominent figure during the reigns of Richard II, Duke of Normandy; Richard III, Duke of Normandy; and Robert I, Duke of Normandy (996-1035).

Turold and Duvelina had:

- Humphrey de Vieilles du Ponteaudemer
- Herbrand du Ponteaudemer
- Ilbert or Gilbert du Ponteaudemer
- Richard du Ponteaudemer

Humphrey de Vieilles is the father of Roger de Beaumont.

== Sources ==
- Hagger, Mark S. (2017). Norman Rule in Normandy, 911-1144. Boydell Press.
