= Humphrey de Vieilles =

11th-century Norman nobleman

Humphrey de Vieilles (died c. 1050) was the first holder of the "grand honneur" of Beaumont-le-Roger, one of the most important groups of domains in eastern Normandy and the founder of the House of Beaumont. He was married to Albreda or Alberée de la Haye Auberie.

== Early life ==
Humphrey's early life and origins are the subject of much discussion. As reported by later Norman chronicler Robert of Torigni, he was the son of Thorold de Pont-Audemer and grandson of a Torf, from whose name derived that of the village of Tourville-sur-Pont-Audemer. Humphrey's mother, according to Robert of Torigni, was Duvelina, sister of Gunnor, concubine of Richard I, Duke of Normandy. Thus, Humphrey and his Beaumont descendants were kinsmen of the Norman Dukes and other members of the early Anglo-Norman nobility similarly descended from Gunnor's kindred. His ancestry remains controversial. Whatever the truth, there is no doubt that Humphrey is descended--at least in part--from a Scandinavian family.

Besides Beaumont-le-Roger, Humphrey had lands dispersed through the whole of Normandy, in Cotentin, in Hiémois, in the Pays d'Auge, in Basse Seine (Vatteville-la-Rue), in Évrecin (Normanville) and in Vexin normand (Bouafles). These lands originated in the favour of the dukes Richard II and Robert II, from confiscated church lands. The "honneur" of Beaumont was, for example, constituted from the remains of the lands of the abbey of Bernay. Raoul, the Abbot of Bernay and a kinsman of Humphrey, reportedly entrusted a portion of his monastery's holdings to him between 1027 and 1040. Like other lords at the beginning of the 11th century, such as the family of Bellême, he increased the family's power by recovering or winning of ecclesiastical lands. On the other hand, the possessions around Pont-Audemer came to him by family inheritance.

In 1034, Humphrey 'founded' (or, rather, restored) the monastery at Préaux, a few kilometres from Pont-Audemer, with monks from the Saint-Wandrille.

Humphrey also held Bernay Abbey. By contrast, the possessions around Pont-Audemer are from the heritage of his ancestors.

During the minority of Duke William the Bastard, Roger I of Tosny, holder of the "honneur" of Conches, attacked Humphrey's domains. But around 1040, Humphrey's son, Roger de Beaumont, met and defeated Roger in battle, during which Roger of Tosny was killed.

== Children ==
Humphrey married Albreda or Alberée de la Haye. Their children were:

- Robert, the elder, assassinated by Roger de Clères after 1066 and buried at the abbey of Saint-Pierre de Préaux;
- Roger de Beaumont, known as le Barbe († 1094), who succeeded his father.
- Henri de Beaumont fights Roger de Toesny with his brother Roger, sent by his father in 1040.
- Dunelma (perhaps a corrupted form of Duvelina, the name of her grandmother) sister of Roger of Beaumont and mother of a daughter who was a nun at Saint-Léger de Préaux

One other possible child :

- Guillaume de Beaumont, monk at the abbey of Saint-Pierre de Préaux

== Sources ==
- Bauduin, Pierre, La première Normandie (Xe-XIe siècles), Presses Universitaires de Caen, 2004 (in French)
- Cokayne, G. E., with Vicary Gibbs, H.A. Doubleday, Geoffrey H. White, Duncan Warrand and Lord Howard de Walden, editors, The Complete Peerage of England, Scotland, Ireland, Great Britain and the United Kingdom, Extant, Extinct or Dormant, new ed., 13 volumes in 14 (1910–1959; reprint in 6 volumes, Gloucester, U.K.: Alan Sutton Publishing, 2000), volume VII.
- Gazeau, Véronique, Monachisme et aristocratie au XIe siècle : l'exemple de la famille de Beaumont, doctoral thesis, Université de Caen, 1986–1987 (dactyl.) (in French)
