= Companions of William the Conqueror =

People who were with William the Conqueror at the Battle of Hastings in 1066

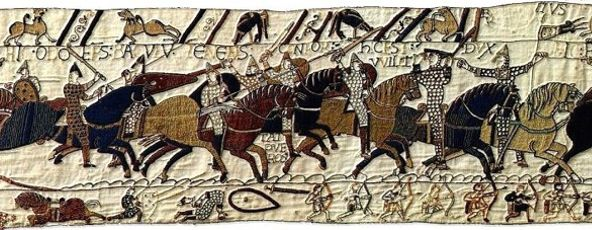
Companions of the Conqueror fighting at Hastings, as depicted in the Bayeux Tapestry. The Duke is on the right, and shows his face to encourage his followers. Legend above: Hic Est Dux Wilel(mus) ("Here is Duke William.") At the left is Bishop Odo of Bayeux. Legend above: Hic Odo Eps (Episcopus) Baculu(m) Tenens, "Here (is) Odo the Bishop holding a club" (see detail below). To the far right, holding a standard, is Eustace, Count of Boulogne (see detail below), with legend above, in upper margin: E[...]TIUS, standing for Eustatius, a Latinised version of "Eustace". The figure is said by others to be Turstin FitzRolf, said by Orderic Vitalis to have carried the Norman standard: Turstinus filius Rollonis vexillum Normannorum portavit, "Turstin son of Rollo carried the standard of the Normans," The Tapestry however depicts it as the Papal Banner, a cross, granted to the Duke by Pope Alexander II to signify papal approval of the Norman Conquest of England.

William the Conqueror had men of diverse standing and origins under his command at the Battle of Hastings in 1066. With these and other men he went on in the five succeeding years to conduct the Harrying of the North and complete the Norman conquest of England.

The term "Companions of the Conqueror" in the widest sense signifies those who planned, organised and joined with William the Conqueror, Duke of Normandy, in the Norman Conquest (1066–1071). The term is however more narrowly defined as those nobles who actually fought with Duke William in the Battle of Hastings. This article is concerned with the latter narrow definition.

== Proof versus legend ==
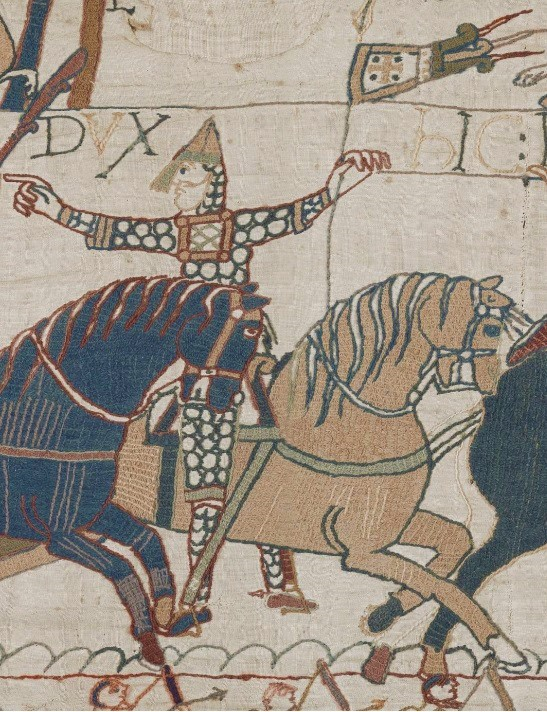
This knight depicted in the Bayeux Tapestry (detail of above) appears below the marginal legend E[...]tius, a Latinised version of Eustace. He has therefore been identified as Eustace, Count of Boulogne. His finger pointing to Duke William seems to depict his urging the Duke to retreat, as the account in William of Poitiers relates. However, others state the figure to be Turstin FitzRolf, due to its carrying of a standard depicting a cross, apparently the Papal Banner. Turstin was described as having carried the "Standard of the Normans", by Orderic Vitalis.

Over the centuries since the Battle of Hastings, many people in England have claimed that an ancestor fought on the Norman side. While there is sound evidence of extensive settlement in England by people of Norman, Breton and Flemish origin after 1066, the fact remains that the names of only 15 men who were with Duke William at the battle can be found in reliable sources.

This group is sometimes called the "proven companions", Many lists and so-called "rolls" of other alleged companions have been drawn up over the ages but, unless new evidence turns up, all are conjecture of no historical value. The three unchallenged sources remain as follows:

== Reliable contemporary sources ==
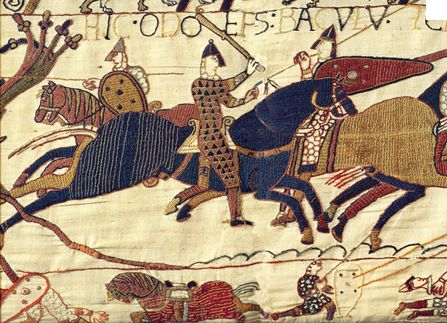
Odo, Bishop of Bayeux, fighting at Hastings, holding a club. Legend above: Hic Odo Eps (Episcopus) Baculu(m) Tenens Confortat Pueros, "Here Odo the Bishop holding a club gives strength to the boys." The club may reflect his clerical status which might have precluded the shedding of blood by sword, yet in the same scene Duke William himself also holds a club (Bayeux Tapestry)

The following three sources constitute the only generally accepted reliable contemporary evidence which names participants at the Battle of Hastings. Among all three sources, only 15 names result.

- Gesta Guillelmi II Ducis Normannorum ("The Deeds of William II, Duke of the Normans"), by William of Poitiers, written between 1071 and 1077. The author was born in about 1020 in Les Préaux, near Pont-Audemer, and belonged to an influential Norman family. After serving as a soldier he studied at Poitiers then returned to Normandy to become chaplain to Duke William and archdeacon of Lisieux. He died in 1090. His work is a eulogistic biography of the Duke. The earlier and concluding parts are lost, but the extant part covers the period between 1047 and 1068 and contains details of the Conqueror's life, although untrustworthy with regard to affairs in England. It gives a detailed description of the preparations for the Norman Conquest of England, the Battle of Hastings and its aftermath. The work forms the basis for much of the writing of Orderic Vitalis.
- Historia Ecclesiastica (The Ecclesiastical History), by Orderic Vitalis, particularly books 4 & 5. Orderic was born in England in about 1075, the son of a Norman priest, and at the age of 11 became a novice monk in Normandy in the monastery of St Evroul-en-Ouche. He started his great work, commissioned to be primarily a history of his monastery, in about 1110 and continued it until his death in 1142.
- The Bayeux Tapestry, an annotated pictorial representation of the Norman Conquest. It was probably made in Canterbury, shortly after the event in the 11th century (many figures on the tapestry can be shown to have been copied from figures on manuscripts known to have been in Canterbury at the time). It may have been taken to Bayeux by Bishop Odo, William's half brother, when he returned there in the 1070s.

These three sources are unfortunately manifestly inadequate, as all are primarily from a Norman perspective. William of Poitiers, chamberlain to Duke William and a trained knight, who provides the most detail, was absent in France during the battle, and betrays severe prejudices in respect of Breton culture and their role at Hastings. Both William and Orderic state that the Bretons were a major component of the battle array, but neither names any of the Bretons present.

== Proven companions ==
The order in which names are listed below is that given in the respective sources:

- (1) Robert de Beaumont, later 1st Earl of Leicester (Source: William of Poitiers)

"A certain Norman, Robert, son of Roger of Beaumont, being nephew and heir to Henry, Count of Meulan, through Henry's sister Adeline, found himself that day in battle for the first time. He was as yet but a young man and he performed feats of valour worthy of perpetual remembrance. At the head of a troop which he commanded on the right wing he attacked with the utmost bravery and success."

- (2) Eustace, Count of Boulogne, a.k.a. Eustace II (Source: William of Poitiers)

"With a harsh voice he (Duke William) called to Eustace of Boulogne, who with 50 knights was turning in flight and was about to give the signal for retreat. This man came up to the Duke and said in his ear that he ought to retire since he would court death if he went forward. But at the very moment when he uttered the words Eustace was struck between the shoulders with such force that blood gushed out from his mouth and nose and half dead he only made his escape with the aid of his followers."

- (3) William, Count of Évreux (Source: William of Poitiers)

"There were present in this battle: Eustace, Count of Boulogne; William, son of Richard, Count of Evreux; Geoffrey, son of Rotrou, Count of Mortagne; William FitzOsbern; Haimo, Vicomte of Thouars; Walter Giffard; Hugh of Montfort-sur-Risle; Rodulf of Tosny; Hugh of Grantmesnil; William of Warenne, and many other most renowned warriors whose names are worthy to be commemorated in histories among the bravest soldiers of all time."

- (4) Geoffrey, Count of Mortagne & Lord of Nogent, later Count of Perche (fr) (Source: William of Poitiers)
- (5) William fitz Osbern, later 1st Earl of Hereford (Source: William of Poitiers)
- (6) Aimeri, Viscount of Thouars a.k.a. Aimery IV (Source: William of Poitiers)
- (7) Walter Giffard, Lord of Longueville (Source: William of Poitiers)
- (8) Hugh de Montfort, Lord of Montfort-sur-Risle (Source: William of Poitiers)
- (9) Ralph de Tosny, Lord of Conches a.k.a. Raoul II (Source: William of Poitiers)
- (10) Hugh de Grandmesnil (Source: William of Poitiers)
- (11) William de Warenne, later 1st Earl of Surrey (Source: William of Poitiers)
- (12) William Malet, Lord of Graville (Source: William of Poitiers)

"His (King Harold's) corpse was brought into the Duke's camp and William gave it for burial to William, surnamed Malet, and not to Harold's mother, who offered for the body of her beloved son its weight in gold."

- (13) Odo, Bishop of Bayeux, later Earl of Kent (Source: Bayeux Tapestry)

"Hic Odo Eps (Episcopus) Baculu(m) Tenens Confortat Pueros." ("Here Odo the Bishop holding a club strengthens the boys.")

- (14) Turstin fitz Rolf a.k.a. Turstin fitz Rou and Turstin le Blanc, (Source: Orderic Vitalis)
- (15) Engenulf de Laigle (Source: Orderic Vitalis)

== Additional companions ==
These five were agreed upon by both David C. Douglas and Geoffrey H. White and are from the Complete Peerage XII–1, Appendix L.

- (16) Geoffrey de Mowbray, Bishop of Coutances (Source: William of Poitiers)
- (17) Robert of Mortain (Source: The Bayeux Tapestry)
- (18) Wadard. Believed to be a follower of the Bishop of Bayeux (Source: The Bayeux Tapestry)
- (19) Vital. Believed to be a follower of the Bishop of Bayeux (Source: The Bayeux Tapestry)
- (20) Gilbert d'Auffay, Seigneur of Auffay (Source: Orderic Vitalis)

Since the time of these lists, J. F. A. Mason in the English Historical Review adds one additional name:

- (21) Humphrey of Tilleul-en-Auge (Source: Orderic Vitalis)

== Less reliable sources ==
- Carmen de Hastingae Proelio (Song of the Battle of Hastings), a poem, said to be by Bishop Guy of Amiens and written shortly after 1066.
- Roman de Rou (The Romance of Rolf), written by Wace, about 1160–1170. Lists 116 names.
- Cronicques de Normendie, by William Le Talleur. Published at Rouen, Normandy, in 1487.
- Collectanea by John Leland (d. 1552). Based on a Roll of Battle Abbey.
- Holinshed's Chronicles of England, Scotland and Ireland, by Raphael Holinshed (1529–1580), first published in 1577, in England. Said to be based on Le Talleur, and Leland.
- Roll of Battle Abbey, various in number, date and reliability, surviving from 16th century. The original version, now long lost, is said to have been placed in Battle Abbey, built by William the Conqueror on the spot of King Harold's death, shortly after the Battle.
- Roll of Dives-sur-Mer, Normandy, 1862. Names were engraved in 1862 under the auspices of the French Archaeological Society, on the wall of the nave of the Norman church (11th century) of Dives-sur-Mer. Four hundred seventy-five names are listed, based mainly on names contained in the Domesday Book. The names are therefore merely those of Normans holding land in England in 1086, many of whom may have fought at Hastings.
- Roll of Falaise, Normandy, 1931. This consists of a bronze plaque erected on the initiative of the French government in 1931 in the Château de Falaise. It lists 315 names, based on the Roman de Rou and one of the Battle Abbey Rolls.
