= Waleran de Beaumont, 1st Earl of Worcester =

Anglo-Norman noble (1104–1166)

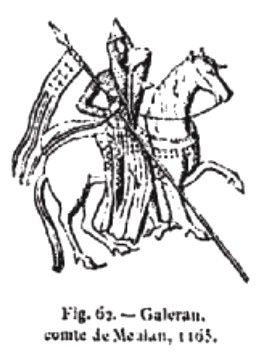
Detail from one of the surviving seals of Waleran de Beaumont, showing chequy proto-heraldry

Waleran de Beaumont (1104–1166) was an Anglo-Norman nobleman. In his early adulthood, he was a member of the conspiracy of Amaury III of Montfort; later in his career, he participated in the Anarchy and the Second Crusade. During the reign of Henry II of England, Waleran's close ties to Louis VII of France caused him to fall out of grace.

== Early life ==
Waleran was born in 1104, the elder of twin sons of Robert de Beaumont, 1st Earl of Leicester, and Elizabeth of Vermandois, Countess of Leicester. On their father's death in June 1118, the boys came into the wardship of King Henry I of England. They remained in his care till late in 1120 when they were declared adult and allowed to succeed to their father's lands by a division already arranged between the king and their father before his death. By the arrangement, Waleran succeeded to the county of Meulan upriver on the Seine from the Norman border, and the principal family Norman honours of Beaumont-le-Roger and Pont Audemer. His great possessions included the forest of Brotonne, which was centred on his castle of Vatteville on the left bank of the Seine. As part of the family arrangement, Waleran also received a large estate in Dorset centred on the manor of Sturminster Marshall.

== Rebellion and imprisonment ==
Late in 1122, Waleran was drawn into a conspiracy with Amaury III of Montfort, count of Évreux, in support of the claimant to Normandy, William Clito, son of Robert Curthose. The king, however, detected the conspiracy, and Waleran and his young colleagues were caught unawares by a preemptive strike by the king's army against the rebel centre of Montfort-sur-Risle. Waleran rallied and based his resistance to the king at his castle of Brionne.

In October 1123, he lost his fortress of Pont Audemer on the Norman coast to a siege, despite calling in military help from his French relations and allies. After a winter of raiding, on 25 March 1124 Waleran proceeded to the relief of his castle of Vatteville, with his three brothers-in-law, Hugh de Châteauneuf, Hugh de Montfort and William, Lord of Bréval. The returning column was intercepted by a force of knights and soldiers of Henry I's household between Bourgtheroulde and Boissy-le-Châtel, the royal commander being given variously as William de Tancarville or Odo Borleng.

The royal household troops decisively defeated Waleran in the Battle of Bourgthéroulde when he attempted a mounted charge at the head of his men, shooting their horses from under them. Waleran's remaining castles continued to resist until 16 April 1124 when Waleran was forced by the king to order his seneschal Morin du Pin to surrender them. Waleran's lands were seized and he was imprisoned first at Rouen, then at Bridgnorth in Shropshire and finally at Wallingford Castle.

Waleran was released for unknown reasons in 1129. He resumed an active role at court and he and his twin brother were both present at Henry's deathbed. He was probably involved in the discussions of the Norman magnates in December 1135 as to who should succeed to Normandy and England.

== Lieutenant of Normandy ==
The accession of Stephen may have taken him by surprise but he had already offered his allegiance to the new king before Easter 1136. At the court he was betrothed to the king's infant daughter, Matilda, and received the city and county of Worcester as her marriage portion. After Easter he went to Normandy taking authority from the king to act as his lieutenant in the duchy.

In September he commanded the army of Norman magnates which repelled the invasion by Geoffrey of Anjou, husband of the Empress Matilda, daughter of Henry I. He was also able to capture the chief rebel Roger de Toeni. He remained there until the following spring and then returned to England.

The next year he attended the king on his tour of Normandy, crossed back to England with him at the end of the year, by which time he was beginning to undermine the previous ascendancy at court of the bishops of Winchester and Salisbury. He and his family began to monopolise favour and patronage at Stephen's court and they alienated the faction headed by Earl Robert of Gloucester, who in retaliation adopted the cause of his half-sister, the Empress.

In June 1138, Waleran was in Normandy to confront successfully again an invading Angevin army. Waleran used his extensive connections at the French court to mobilize a large force of French knights to assist him. It was probably in 1138 that he received the second title of Earl of Worcester. He founded the Cistercian abbey of Bordesley at the end of that year to mark his arrival in the county. The same year his youngest brother Hugh received the earldom of Bedford and other relations were similarly honoured.

Before Easter 1139, Waleran was in Paris on an embassy to his cousin, the new King Louis VII of France. Upon his return he was the motivating force behind the overthrow of the court faction headed by the justiciar, Bishop Roger of Salisbury. The bishop and his family were arrested in June, and their wealth and many of their possessions confiscated.

== Civil war ==
With the arrival of Robert of Gloucester in England in September 1139, the civil war between Stephen and Matilda's supporters got under way. One of the first attacks Gloucester sponsored was an assault on Waleran's English base at Worcester. The city was attacked and sacked on 7 November 1139. Waleran retaliated savagely against the rebel centres of Sudeley and Tewkesbury.

Waleran was present at the Battle of Lincoln in 1141. He was one of the royalist earls who fled when they saw that the battle was lost. Waleran escaped, but the king was captured and imprisoned at Bristol. Waleran fought on for several months, probably basing himself at Worcester, where he had to deal with the defection of his sheriff, William de Beauchamp. It may have been at this time that he seized and fortified the Herefordshire Beacon for the bishop of Hereford complained of his lordship of this castle in 1148.

At last late in the summer of 1141 Waleran gave up the struggle as news reached him that his Norman lands were being taken over by the invading Angevin army. He surrendered to the Empress Matilda, and had to accept her appropriation of the abbey of Bordesley as it had been founded on a royal estate. However, once in Normandy, Waleran was accepted at the court of Geoffrey of Anjou, and his lands in England and Normandy were confirmed to him. His first marriage, to the king's daughter Matilda, had ended with the child's death in London in 1137. Around the end of 1142, Waleran married Agnes, daughter of Amaury de Montfort, count of Évreux. As a result of the marriage he obtained estates in the Pays de Caux and the lordship of Gournay-sur-Marne in the Ile de France. Waleran had already obtained his mother's marriage portion of the honour of Elbeuf on the Seine on her death in or around 1139. Despite the political reverses on 1141, Waleran was considerably wealthier at the end of the year than he had been at the beginning.

Waleran served with Geoffrey of Anjou at the siege of Rouen in 1143/4. During it he captured and burnt the suburb of Emendreville and the church of St. Sever, where many of both sexes perished in the flames. He consolidated his position as leader of the Norman nobility by a formal treaty with his cousin Robert du Neubourg, seneschal of Normandy. However, Waleran seems to have turned his mind to the French court at this time.

In 1144–1145, he left France to be on a pilgrimage on the Way of St James to Santiago de Compostela. In Easter 1146, he was at Vézelay for the preaching of the Second Crusade and attended the great assembly of magnates at Paris from April to June 1147 to meet the pope and Louis VII. On 29 June, he was joint leader of the Anglo-Norman crusaders on their rendezvous with Louis VII at Worms. He accompanied the crusades to Syria, (Note: It is unlikely that he participated in the Siege of Lisbon) and its unfortunate conclusion before Damascus, where he also received criticism for his role there. He seems to have left Palestine before King Louis, taking the sea voyage home. He was shipwrecked somewhere on his return, perhaps on the coast of Provence. He promised to build a Cistercian abbey if he survived the wreck, and in due course he built the abbey of St Mary de Voto (of the Vow) or Valasse Abbey in the present Gruchet-le-Valasse in fulfilment of his vow.

== Political decline ==
In 1149, Waleran started to lose favour within the Angevin faction, and was gradually excluded from power in Normandy, as his influence waned with the coming of age of Duke Henry and Geoffrey Plantagenet.

Waleran's great influence in Normandy survived till 1151, but the new regime of Duke Henry was not sympathetic to him. He made the fatal error of temporising with the Capetian court and assisting the campaigns of Louis VII, his overlord for Meulan. Though his support gained Waleran the hugely profitable wardship of the great county of Vermandois during the minority of his young cousin Count Ralph II, it also led to his downfall. In the second half of 1153, he was ambushed by his nephew and enemy Robert de Montfort, who held him captive in the castle of Orbec, due to his link with Louis VII, while his Norman and English estates were stripped from Waleran by Duke Henry's friends and officers. The earldom of Worcester was suppressed and his Worcestershire castles destroyed in 1155.

Although Waleran was released, his power in Normandy was broken, and an attempt to reclaim Montfort-sur-Risle from his nephew was a humiliating failure. Waleran was an outsider at the court of Henry II, and between 1160 and 1162 lost his Norman lands and castles when he supported Louis VII against Henry II. His last years were eked out as a landowner and justice in the duchy. The last notice of his activities is a settlement of his affairs relating to his priory of Gournay-sur-Marne around the end of 1165. Twenty days before his death he entered the abbey of St Peter of Préaux, the ancestral abbey of his family south of Pont Audemer in Normandy, and died as a monk there on 9 or 10 April 1166. He was buried in its chapter house alongside several other members of his dynasty.

== Aristocrat and humanist ==
Waleran was educated in the liberal arts and philosophy. An elegy to him by Stephen of Rouen, monk of Bec-Hellouin, reveals that he composed Latin verse. In 1142, Waleran tells us that he personally researched the deeds in the archive of Meulan priory before confirming its possessions. Like his twin brother, he also seems to have been an assiduous writer of letters and a number of them survive. He was also a literary patron, as Geoffrey of Monmouth dedicated the earliest edition of his History of the Kings of Britain to him in 1136.

Waleran founded Cistercian abbeys at Bordesley, Worcestershire (1139), and Le Valasse, Normandy (c.1150), though in both cases the abbeys were taken over by the king. He was a generous patron of the two ancestral Benedictine monasteries at Les Préaux (Saint-Pierre for men and Saint-Léger for women). He was besides accepted as advocate of the abbey of Bec-Hellouin, and was patron of its priory at Meulan, founding another at Beaumont-le-Roger. He founded a Benedictine priory at Gournay-sur-Marne. He endowed a major hospital at Pont Audemer, which still survives.

== Family and children ==
Waleran married, firstly, Matilda, daughter of King Stephen of England and Matilda of Boulogne, Countess de Boulogne, circa March 1136. She died in 1137 aged only four. He married, secondly, Agnes de Montfort, daughter of Amaury III de Montfort, Count of Évreux, and Agnes de Garlande, c. 1141.

Waleran and Agnes had:

1. Robert de Beaumont, Count of Meulan.
2. Isabelle de Meulan (d. 10 May 1220), married twice:
  1. ca 1161 Geoffroy, lord of Mayenne;
  2. ca 1170 Maurice II, lord of Craon.
3. Waleran de Meulan
4. Amaury de Meulan, lord of Gournay-sur-Marne.
5. Roger de Meulan or Beaumont, viscount of Évreux.
6. Raoul (Ralph) de Meulan.
7. Etienne (Stephen) de Meulan.
8. Marie de Meulan, married Hugh Talbot, Baron of Cleuville

== See also ==
- The Anarchy

== Sources ==
- Burgess, Glyn Sheridan (1987). The Lais of Marie de France: Text and Context. Manchester University Press.
- Cokayne, G.E.; Vicary Gibbs, H.A. Doubleday, Geoffrey H. White, Duncan Warrand and Lord Howard de Walden, editors. The Complete Peerage of England, Scotland, Ireland, Great Britain and the United Kingdom, Extant, Extinct or Dormant, new ed. 13 volumes in 14. 1910–1959. Reprint in 6 volumes, Gloucester, UK: Alan Sutton Publishing, 2000.
- Crouch, David (1986). The Beaumont Twins: The Roots and Branches of Power in the Twelfth Century. Cambridge.
- Crouch, D. The Reign of King Stephen, 1135-1154 (London, 2000).
- Crouch, David (2004). Waleran, count of Meulan and earl of Worcester (1104–1166). Oxford University Press.
- Crouch, David (2008). "The Historian, Lineage and Heraldry 1050-1250". In Coss, Peter R.; Keen, Maurice (eds.). Heraldry, Pageantry and Social Display in Medieval England. Boydell Press.
- Edward T. Beaumont, J.P. The Beaumonts in History. A.D. 850-1850. Oxford.
- Houth, E. 'Galeran II, comte de Meulan, catalogue de ses actes precédé d'une étude biographique', Bullétin Philologique et Historique (1961).
- King, E. 'Waleran, count of Meulan, earl of Worcester, 1104-1166', in, Tradition and Change: Essays in Honour of Marjorie Chibnall, ed. D. Greenway and others (Cambridge, 1985), 115–130.
- Pollock, M. A. (2015). Scotland, England and France After the Loss of Normandy, 1204-1296 "Auld Amitie". Boydell Press.
- Poole, Austin Lane (1958). From Domesday Book to Magna Carta, 1087-1216. Oxford University Press.
- de Pontfarcy, Yolande (1995). "Si Marie de France était Marie de Meulan". Cahiers de Civilisation Médiévale Année (in French). 38–152.
- Remfry, P.M., 'The Herefordshire Beacon and the families of King Harold II and the Earls of Hereford and Worcester' [Malvern, 2008].
- Schmieder, Felicitas; O'Doherty, Marianne (2015). Travels and Mobilities in the Middle Ages: From the Atlantic to the Black Sea. Vol. 21. Turnhout, Belgium: Brepols Publishers. ISBN 978-2-503-55449-5.
- Tyerman, Christopher (1996). Who's Who in Early Medieval England, 1066-1272.
- White, Geoffrey H. 'King Stephen's Earldoms', Transactions of the Royal Historical Society, Fourth Series, Vol. 13 (1930), pp. 51–82.
