= Walram III =

Walram III or Waleran III may refer to:

- Waleran III of Meulan (died 1069)
- Waleran III, Duke of Limburg (died 1226)
- Walram III of Nassau-Wiesbaden (died 1322), son of Adolf, King of Germany
- Waleran III, Count of Ligny (1355–1415)
