= County of Meulan =

French title of nobility

Coats of arms of counts of Meulan

In the Middle Ages, the county of Meulan was a county of Île-de-France.

== Geography ==
The geographical extent of the county associated with the castle and town of Meulan becomes evident in the time of Robert I (1081–1118) and Waleran de Beaumont (1118–1166). The county then ran west along the right bank of the Seine as far as the lordship of La Roche Guyon, and included the priory of St-Martin-la-Garenne, of which Robert I was a patron. To the south of the town, the count controlled the riparine lands of the Méresais. The count had the allegiance of two powerful viscounties. The viscount of Meulan, with his own castle at Mézy-sur-Seine, was the chief tenant of the county. But the count also controlled the viscount of Mantes, and river traffic at its bridge too, although the town and the associated Mantois was in fact mostly Capetian demesne. Somehow the detached lordship of Neauphle-le-Château north of Versailles in the Yvelines was also a dependency of the county. The count also held in fee of the bishop of Paris the substantial Parisian suburb of La Grève.

== Creation ==
The lordship of Meulan was originally a viscounty whose initial stronghold was located on the Island of Meulan. This island surrounded by the River Seine had enabled the creation of a bridge since Gallo-Roman times, which the castle defended. This place became essential for controlling the Seine valley against the Normans. The lordship was based on the north of the Madrie pagus and, on the other side of the Seine, on a narrow fringe extending about five kilometers, detached from the county of Vexin.

The county of Meulan appeared when the otherwise unknown Count Waleran established an independent power base on this fortified island before the year 1015. Waleran's origins are subject to several genealogical myths, not least that he had predecessors in his office.

== History ==
Waleran was active in the politics of his day, but the extent of the county at that date is unknown. Both he and his son Count Hugh maintained an independence from the Capetian king at Paris by a judicious if dangerous alliance with the dukes of Normandy downstream. This led to the marriage of Adeline, Count Hugh's sister, to the Norman magnate, Roger de Beaumont.

On Count Hugh's death in 1081 his nephew, Robert de Beaumont, acquired the county. In his time it is clear that the settlement of Meulan had thrown out a suburb (called Locenis) on to the right bank of the Seine north of the fortified island. After 1109 and the sacking of the town by Louis VI of France, Count Robert built a new castle on the bluffs of Locenis. The original island settlement was dominated now by a fortified bridge, at which river tolls were collected, and the church of St Nicaise, refounded by the count as a priory of the Norman abbey of Bec-Hellouin. Count Robert founded a collegiate church of St Nicholas in his new castle.

The county was a vital strategic possession between the power of Normandy and Paris, and successive counts exploited their bargaining position. The counts' position was also a dangerous one. As vassals alike of the duke of Normandy and king of France, they were very exposed when the two rulers went to war. The dual allegiance of the counts led to several episodes of confiscation of their Norman lands. It was this division of loyalty that in the end led to the suppression of the county, when King Philip Augustus dispossessed Count Robert II in 1203 during his campaigns against Normandy. Robert died an exile, and his line was not allowed to succeed to the county.

== List of counts of Meulan ==
- Hugh, Lord of Meulan
- Waleran I (c. 990 – c. 1069)
- Hugh (d. 1081)
- Robert I (1081–1118), also Earl of Leicester
- Waleran II (1118–1166), also Earl of Worcester
- Robert II (1166–1204)
- Waleran III (d. 1191)

...

- Olivier le Daim (1477–1484)
