= Waleran III of Meulan =

Waleran III (fl. 1180–1193) was the eldest son and heir of Count Robert II of Meulan and co-ruler of the county of Meulan during his father's lifetime.

Waleran was associated with his father in the sale of a mill to the Priory of the Holy Trinity in 1180. In 1182 or 1183, his father associated him in the rule of Meulan and the lordship of Beaumont-le-Roger and handed over the castle of Meulan to him. He used the title "count and lord of the castle of Meulan". He also named him as his heir in those lands while reserving other lands for his other children.

Waleran's marriage to Margaret, daughter of Ralph II of Fougères, was negotiated at Mortain in 1189. The negotiations brought together many of the leading men of the Duchy of Normandy to stand as pledges or sureties for the nuptial contract. In a subsequent act, Robert, in preparation to go on crusade, bestowed all his lands on Waleran as his universal heir, reserving only his right to bequeath lands to his other children. Waleran and Margaret had a son named Ralph, who became the lord of Courseulles-sur-Mer and was still living in 1266.

With his father, Waleran joined Richard I of England on the Third Crusade (1190–1191). According to some sources, he died in battle against the Seljuk Turks. In the romance Foulques de Candie, he is depicted dying in single combat against a Saracen leader. In 1193–1194, however, he is recorded at Mortain as a witness to an act of Count John Lackland. He predeceased his father. He probably died around 1197.

Margaret of Fougères outlived her husband, dying in 1209. She may be the old contesse de Meullent mentioned in the song Ja de chanter en ma vie by the trouvère Renaut de Sabloeil.
