= Préaux Abbey =

Abbey in Eure, France

Coordinates: 49.3234°N 0.4741°E

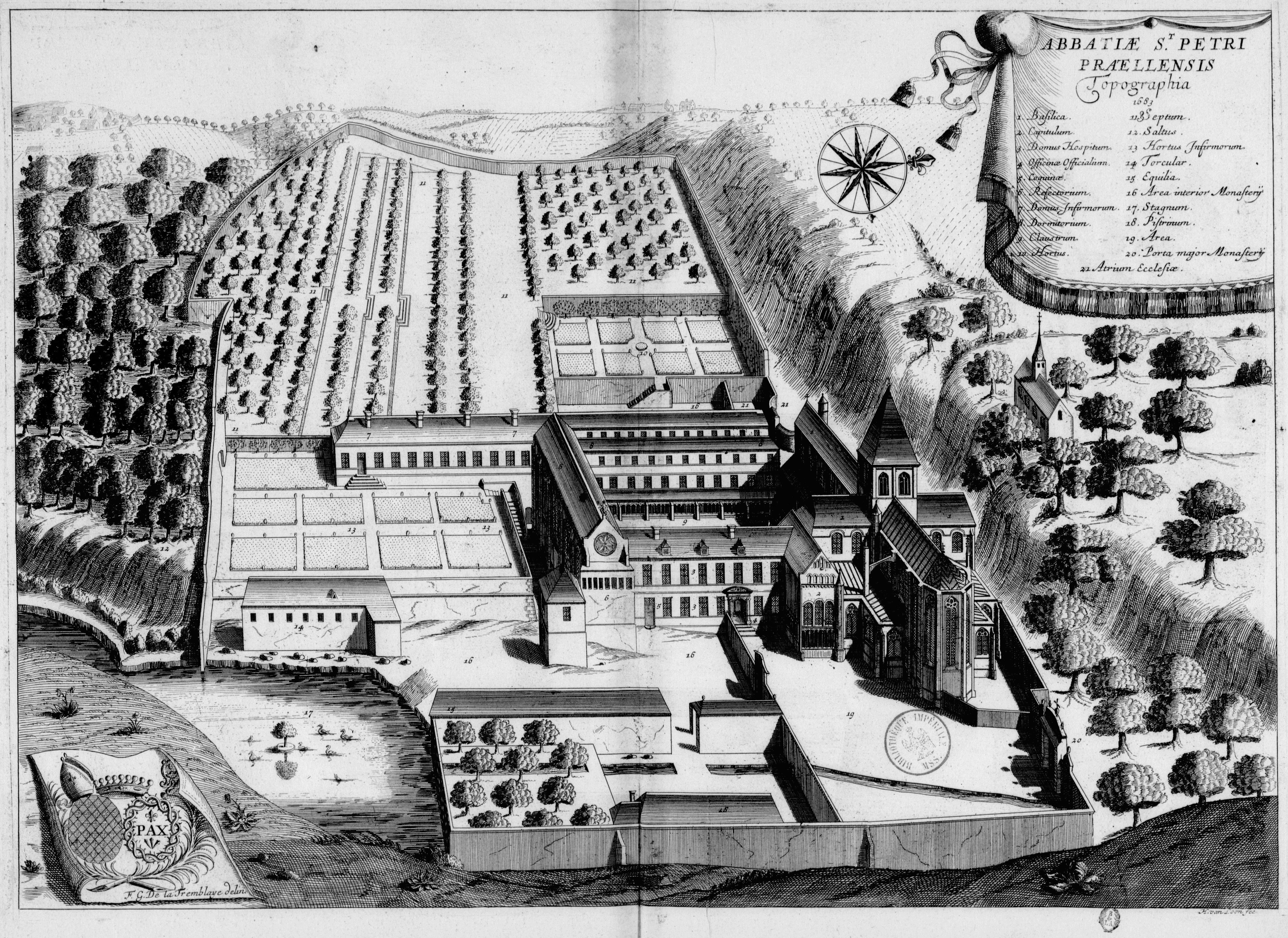
Abbey of Saint-Pierre des Préaux (Monasticon Gallicanum)

Préaux Abbey (French: Abbaye Saint-Pierre des Préaux) was a Benedictine monastery dedicated to Saint Peter at Les Préaux, in Normandy, France.

== History ==
The abbey was first mentioned in 833 by Saint Ansegisus, abbot of Fontenelle, but was destroyed by Vikings.

In 1033–1034 the abbey was refounded on the same site.

In 1050–1051, Humphrey de Vieilles, following the wish of his wife Albreda, founded a second abbey for women, the Abbey of Saint-Léger.

The abbey was greatly endowed by the local lords Saint Peter's Abbey became an influential player in the region and oversaw the construction of parish churches including that of Saint-Germain at Pont-Audemer and the 12th-century church at Saint-Samson-de-la-Roque.

In the second half of the 12th century, the monks of St. Peter attempted to found a city next to the monastery.

A village charter is mentioned in 1078, but we have no knowledge of the characteristics of the custom applied to the town. The town never really took off and Alfred Canel reported that Préaux township was mentioned as a villa in a 14th-century act.

During the French Revolution, the two abbeys that were the economic engine of the territory were, sold as national property.

== Farming ==
The abbey owned two farms, one at Bosc-Auber belonging to Saint-Pierre, and one at Corbeaumont linked to Saint-Léger.

== Water mills ==
The monasteries also exploited the hydropower of the local stream. Each of the abbeys had its own mill, located in their own enclosure and a mill downstream, where their vassals were required to grind their wheat.

== Burials ==
- Roger de Beaumont
- Henry de Beaumont, 1st Earl of Warwick
- Robert de Beaumont, 1st Earl of Leicester
