= Gilbert d'Auffay =

11th century French nobleman

- Died: 15 August 1087

Gilbert d'Auffay (Note: Also Goubert d'Auffay.) (died 15 August 1087), Lord of Saint-Valéry, was a Norman nobleman who was one of the companions of William the Conqueror and was active in the Norman conquest of England.

== Biography ==
Gilbert was a son of Richard de Heugleville and Ada. He helped William the Conqueror after the invasion of 1066 in the pacification of the country, but declined the offer of English fiefs and returned to Normandy. In 1079 he gave the church of Sainte-Marie d'Auffay to the Abbey of Saint-Evroul.

He died on 15 August 1087 and was buried at Sainte-Marie d'Auffay.

== Marriage and issue ==
Gilbert married Beatrix, daughter of Christian de Valenciennes, they are known to have had the following issue.

- Gauthier d'Auffay, married Havise de Sauqueville, had issue.
- Hugues d'Auffay, monk of Abbey of Saint-Evroul.
- Beatrix d'Auffay
