= Tourville-sur-Pont-Audemer =

- Commune
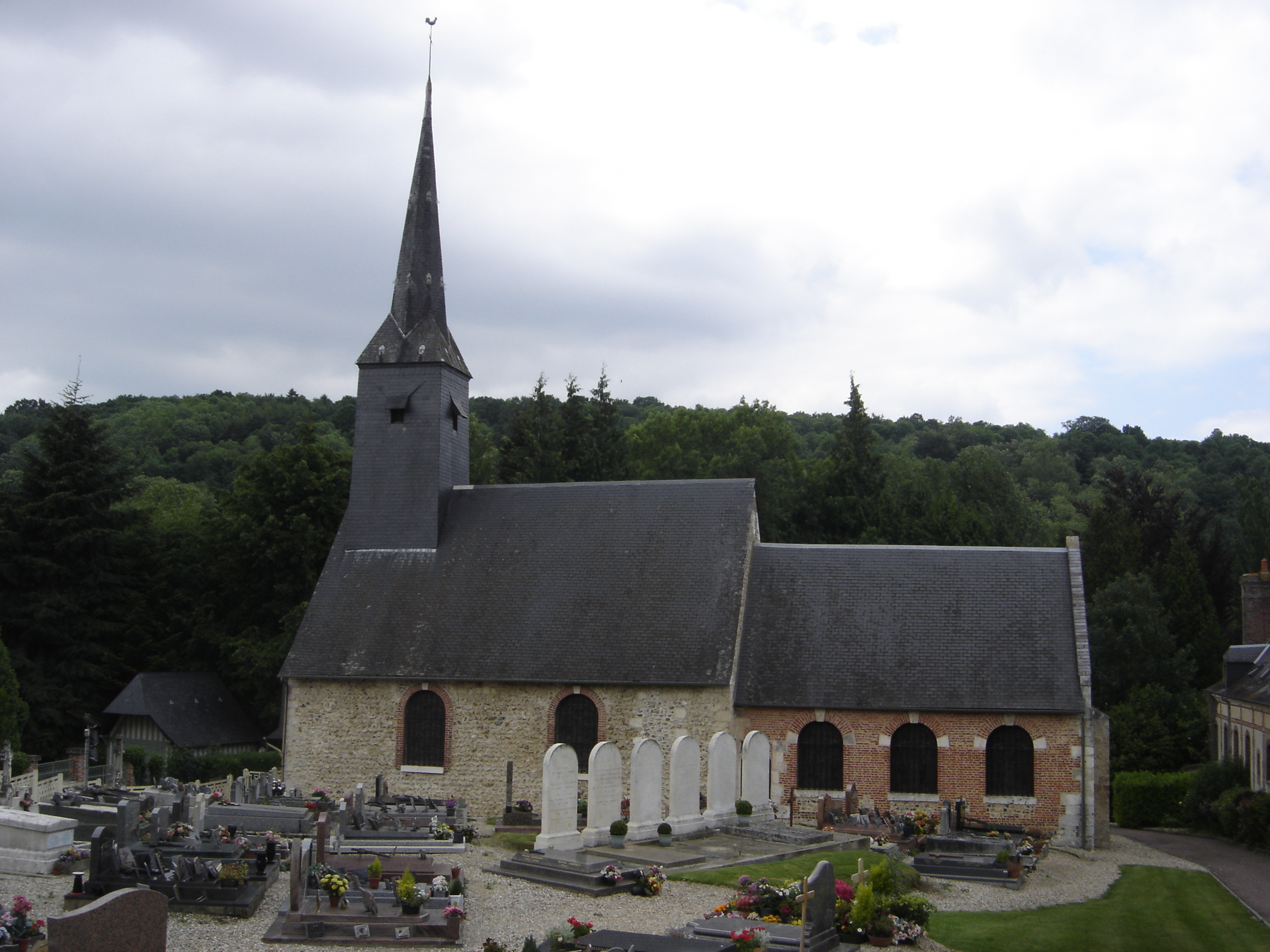
- The church in Tourville-sur-Pont-Audemer
- Location of Tourville-sur-Pont-Audemer
- Location within France Location within Normandy
- Coordinates: 49°19′56″N 0°30′33″E
- Country: France
- Region: Normandy
- Department: Eure
- Arrondissement: Bernay
- Canton: Pont-Audemer
- Intercommunality: Pont-Audemer / Val de Risle

Government
  - Mayor (2020–2026): Jean Legrix
- Area^{1}: 10.8 km^{2} (4.2 sq mi)
- Elevation: 105 m (344 ft)
- Highest elevation: 127 m (417 ft)
- Lowest elevation: 11 m (36 ft)
- Population (2023): 726
  - Density: 67.2/km^{2} (174/sq mi)
- Time zone: UTC+01:00 (CET)
  - Summer (DST): UTC+02:00 (CEST)
- INSEE/Postal code: 27655 /27500
- ^{1} French Land Register data, which excludes lakes, ponds, glaciers > 1 km^{2} (0.386 sq mi or 247 acres) and river estuaries.

Tourville-sur-Pont-Audemer (French pronunciation: [tuʁvil syʁ pɔ̃.t‿odmɛʁ], literally Tourville on Pont-Audemer) is a commune in the Eure department in Normandy in northern France. Its name is derived from its founder Torf.

== Geography ==
The commune along with another 69 communes shares part of a 4,747 hectare, Natura 2000 conservation area, called Risle, Guiel, Charentonne.

== Population ==
Historical population
Year	Pop.	±% p.a.
1968	506	—
1975	565	+1.59%
1982	507	−1.54%
1990	528	+0.51%
1999	554	+0.54%
2007	698	+2.93%
2012	739	+1.15%
2017	721	−0.49%
2023	726	+0.12%
Source: INSEE

== See also ==
- Communes of the Eure department
