= Robert II of Meulan =

Robert de Beaumont, Count of Meulan (c. 1142 – 1204, Poitiers, France), was the son of Waleran IV de Beaumont and Agnes de Montfort.

== Family and children ==
Around 1165 Robert married Maud of Cornwall, daughter of Reginald de Dunstanville, 1st Earl of Cornwall and Beatrice Fitz Richard. They had:

1. Mabel de Beaumont, married William de Redvers, 5th Earl of Devon.
2. Galeran V de Beaumont, Count of Meulan, married Margaret de Fougeres
3. Peter (or Pierre) of Meulan, Dean of Wimborne, Vicar of Sturminster Marshall, Dorset.
4. Henry (or Henri) of Meulan
5. Agnes of Meulan, married Guy de la Roche Guyon V in 1192.
6. Jeanne of Meulan, married Robert II d'Harcourt.

== Sources ==
- de Pontfarcy, Yolande (1995). "Si Marie de France était Marie de Meulan". Cahiers de Civilisation Médiévale Année (in French). 38–152: 353–361.
