= Robert de Beaumont, 1st Earl of Leicester =

Norman nobleman (circa 1046–1118)

Robert de Beaumont, 1st Earl of Leicester, Count of Meulan (c. 1040/1050 – 5 June 1118), also known as Robert of Meulan, was a powerful Norman nobleman, one of the very few proven Companions of William the Conqueror during the Norman Conquest of England in 1066, and was revered as one of the wisest men of his age. Chroniclers spoke highly of his eloquence and his learning, and three kings of England valued his counsel. He was granted immense land-holdings in England (mainly in the Midlands) by William the Conqueror and by Henry I and was created Earl of Leicester.

== Biography ==
Robert was born between 1040 and 1050, the eldest son of Roger de Beaumont (1015–1094) by his wife Adeline of Meulan (died 1081), the daughter of Waleran III, Count de Meulan and Adelais. He was one of the 15 proven Companions of William the Conqueror specifically referred to in surviving documents as having fought at the Battle of Hastings in 1066 under William the Conqueror, Duke of Normandy, who was a distant cousin. He served as leader of the infantry on the right wing of the Norman army, as evidenced in the following near contemporary account by William of Poitiers:

'A certain Norman, Robert, son of Roger of Beaumont, being nephew and heir to Henry, Count of Meulan, through Henry's sister Adeline, found himself that day in battle for the first time. He was as yet but a young man and he performed feats of valour worthy of perpetual remembrance. At the head of a troop which he commanded on the right wing he attacked with the utmost bravery and success".

His service earned him the grant of more than 91 English manors confiscated from the defeated English, as listed in the Domesday Book of 1086.

When his mother died in 1081, Robert inherited the title of Count of Meulan in Normandy, (Note: White states Robert was count of Meulan by 6 Jan 1082.) and the title Viscount Ivry and Lord of Norton. He paid homage to King Philip I of France for these estates and sat as a French Peer in the Parliament held at Poissy.

Robert and his brother Henry were members of the Royal hunting party in the New Forest in Hampshire when King William II Rufus (1087–1100) was shot dead by an arrow on 2 August 1100. He pledged allegiance to William II's brother, King Henry I (1100–1135), who created him Earl of Leicester in 1107.

On the death of William Rufus, William, Count of Évreux and Ralph de Conches made an incursion into Robert's Norman estates, on the pretence they had suffered injury through some advice that Robert had given to the king; their raid was successful and they collected a vast booty.

During the English phase of the Investiture Controversy, he was excommunicated by Pope Paschal II on 26 March 1105 for advising King Henry to continue selecting the bishops of his realm in opposition to the canons of the church. Sometime in 1106, Henry succeeded in having Anselm, the exiled archbishop of Canterbury, revoke this excommunication. Anselm's (somewhat presumptuous) act was ultimately ratified by Paschal.

According to Henry of Huntingdon, Robert died of shame after "a certain earl carried off the lady he had espoused, either by some intrigue or by force and stratagem." He was the last surviving Norman nobleman to have fought in the Battle of Hastings.

Robert de Beaumont was buried at the Abbey of Saint-Pierre de Préaux in Normandy.

== Family ==
In 1096, aged about 50, he married the 11-year-old Elizabeth (or Isabel) de Vermandois, daughter of Hugh Magnus (1053–1101) and Adelaide, Countess of Vermandois (1050–1120). After his death Elizabeth remarried in 1118 to William de Warenne, 2nd Earl of Surrey. He and Elizabeth had the following progeny:

1. Waleran IV de Beaumont, Count of Meulan, 1st Earl of Worcester (b. 1104), eldest twin and heir.
2. Robert de Beaumont, 2nd Earl of Leicester & Earl of Hereford (b. 1104), twin
3. Hugh de Beaumont, 1st Earl of Bedford (born c. 1106)
4. Emma de Beaumont (born 1102)
5. Adeline de Beaumont, married Hugh de Montfort-sur-Risle;, then Richard de Granville of Bideford (died 1147)
6. Aubree de Beaumont, married Hugh II of Châteauneuf-Thimerais
7. Agnes de Beaumont, a nun
8. Maud de Beaumont, married William Lovel
9. Isabel de Beaumont, a mistress of King Henry I, married Gilbert de Clare, 1st Earl of Pembroke, and then Hervé de Montmorency, Constable of Ireland

== In popular culture ==
=== Television ===
Robert De Beaumont is portrayed by Jotham Annan in the 3 part BBC drama-documentary presented by Dan Snow, 1066: A Year to Conquer England.

== Sources ==
- Altschul, Michael (2019). A Baronial Family in Medieval England: The Clares, 1217-1314. Johns Hopkins University Press.
- Edward T. Beaumont, The Beaumonts in History. A.D. 850-1850. Oxford.
- Carpenter, David A. (2003). The Struggle for Mastery: Britain, 1066-1284. Oxford University Press.
- Crouch, David (1986). The Beaumont Twins: The Roots & Branches of Power in the Twelfth Century. Cambridge University Press.
- Crouch, David (2008). "The Historian, Lineage and Heraldry 1050-1250". In Coss, Peter R.; Keen, Maurice (eds.). Heraldry, Pageantry and Social Display in Medieval England. Boydell Press.
- Farrer, W. (1919). "An Outline Itinerary of King Henry the First: Part II". The English Historical Review. 34 (136 (Oct.)): 505–579. doi:10.1093/ehr/XXXIV.CXXXVI.505.
- Le Patourel, John F. (1984). Feudal Empires. Bloomsbury Publishing.
- Vaughn, Sally N. (2022). Anselm of Bec and Robert of Meulan: The Innocence of the Dove and the Wisdom of the Serpent. University of California Press.

Peerage of England
New creation	Earl of Leicester; 1107–1118	Succeeded by Robert de Beaumont
French nobility
Preceded by Hugh de Meulan	Count of Meulan; 1081–1118	Succeeded by Waleran de Beaumont
