= Roger de Beaumont =

Advisor to William the Conqueror

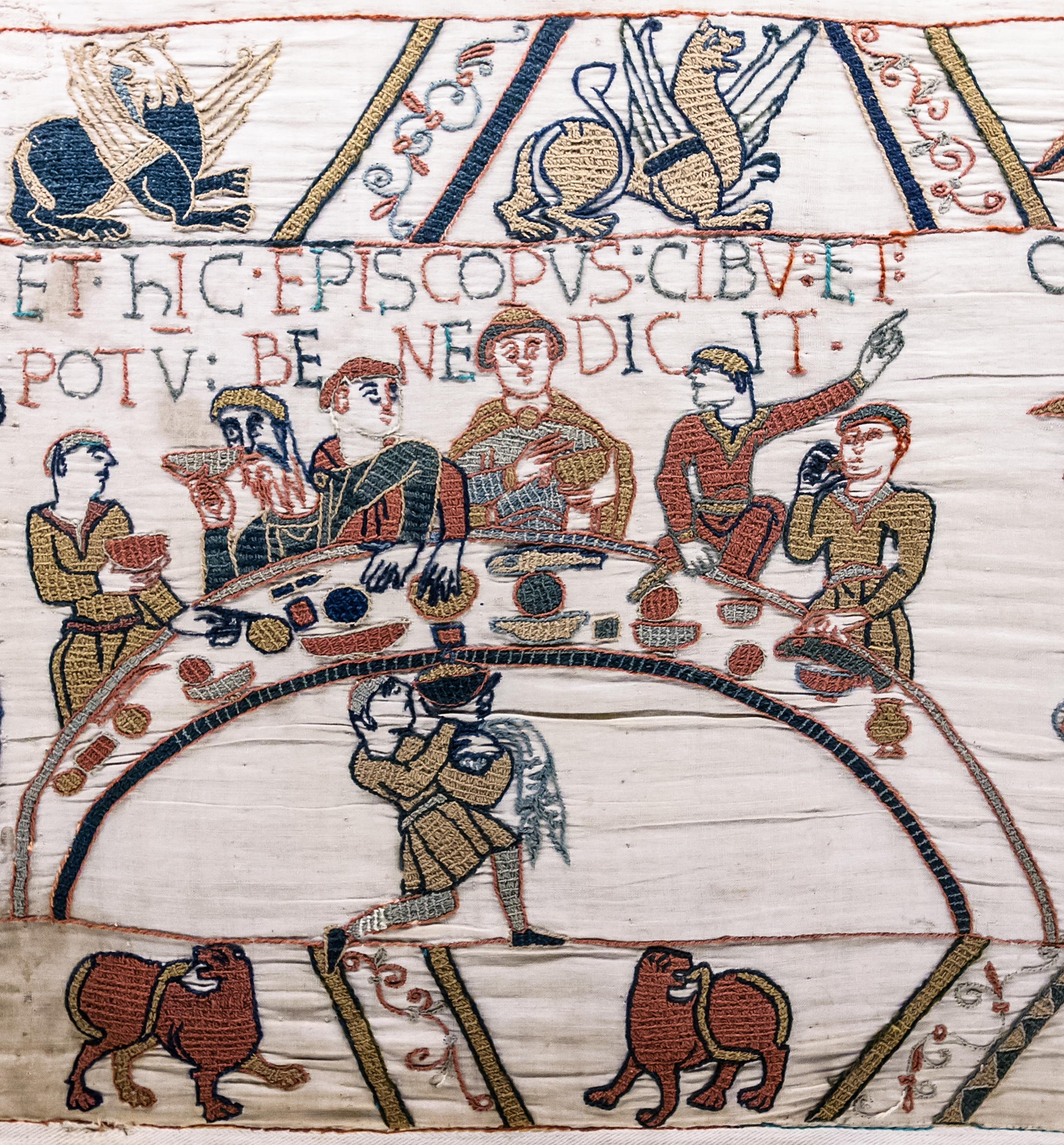
The feast at Hastings as depicted in the Bayeux Tapestry. Roger de Beaumont is possibly the bearded figure on the left.

Roger de Beaumont (c. 1015 – 29 November 1094), feudal lord (French: seigneur) of Beaumont-le-Roger and of Pont-Audemer in Normandy, was a powerful Norman nobleman and close advisor to William the Conqueror.

== Origins ==
Roger was son of Humphrey de Vieilles (who was a grand-nephew of the Duchess Gunnor of Normandy) by his wife Albreda de la Haye Auberie. He was thus a second cousin once removed of William the Conqueror. His Norman feudal lordship had its caput and castle at Beaumont-le-Roger, a settlement situated on the upper reaches of the River Risle, in Normandy, about 46 km SW of Rouen, the capital of the Duchy. He was also feudal lord of Pont-Audemer, a settlement built around the first bridge to cross the River Risle upstream of its estuary, shared with the River Seine.

== Physical appearance ==
Roger was nicknamed La Barbe (Latinised to Barbatus) (i.e. "The Bearded").

== Career ==
Planché described him as "the noblest, the wealthiest, and the most valiant seigneur of Normandy, and the greatest and most trusted friend of the Danish (i.e., Norman) family". The explanation for his exalted position appears to be that as an older cousin who had never rebelled against the young Duke, he was part of the kinship group of noblemen that William relied upon in governing Normandy and fighting-off frequent rebellion and invasions. The historian Frank McLynn observed that William relied heavily on relatives on his mother's side, namely his half-brothers Bishop Odo and Robert, and brothers-in-law, and on relatives descended from the Duchess Gunnor's sisters, since his own paternal kin had proved unreliable.

Wace, the 12th-century historian, wrote that: "At the time of the invasion of England, Roger was summoned to the great council at Lillebonne, on account of his wisdom; but he did not join in the expedition as he was too far advanced in years". Although Roger could not fight, he did not hesitate in contributing a large share of the cost, and provided at his own expense sixty vessels for the conveyance of the troops across the channel. Furthermore, his eldest son and heir fought bravely at Hastings as noted in several contemporary records. As a result, Roger's elder sons were rewarded generously with lands in England, and both eventually were made English earls by the sons of the Conqueror. Wace's statement may therefore cast doubt on the possibility of Roger being depicted in the Bayeux Tapestry feasting at Hastings. However it is possible that he crossed the Channel so he could continue to act as a valued member of the Duke's council, perhaps giving advice on military tactics, yet stayed well behind the line of battle at headquarters.

== Marriage and issue ==
Roger married c. 1048, Adeline of Meulan (c. 1014/1020 – 8 April 1081), the daughter of Waleran, Count de Meulan, and Oda de Conteville. Their surviving children were:

- Robert de Beaumont, 1st Earl of Leicester, Count of Meulan (c.1049–1118), the eldest son and heir. He succeeded his father in the major part of his lands, and was one of the few proven companions of William the Conqueror who fought at the Battle of Hastings in 1066.
- Henry de Beaumont, 1st Earl of Warwick (c.1050–1119), was entrusted with Warwick castle.

== Death and burial ==
Roger was buried at Abbey of Saint-Pierre de Préaux.

== Sources ==
- Hagger, Mark S. (2017). Norman Rule in Normandy, 911-1144. Boydell Press.
- Owen, Dorothy M. (1980). "Magnates, curiales and the Wheel of Fortune". In Brown, R. Allen (ed.). Proceedings of the Battle Conference 1979. The Boydell Press.
- Vaughn, Sally N. (1987). Anselm of Bec and Robert of Meulan: The Innocence of the Dove and the Wisdom of the Serpent. University of California Press.
