= Les Préaux =

- Commune
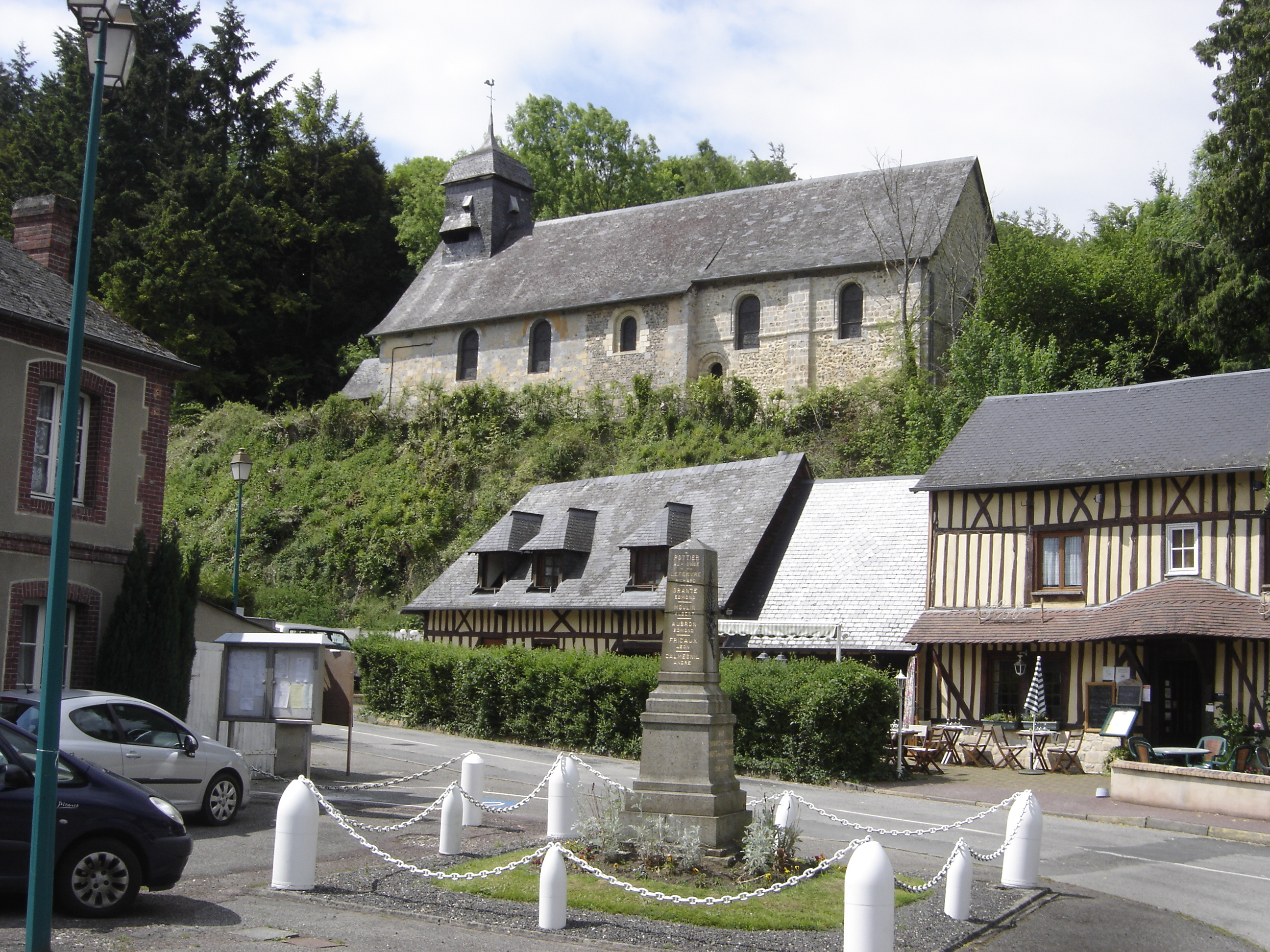
- The church in Les Préaux
- Location of Les Préaux
- Location within France Location within Normandy
- Coordinates: 49°19′30″N 0°28′40″E
- Country: France
- Region: Normandy
- Department: Eure
- Arrondissement: Bernay
- Canton: Pont-Audemer

Government
  - Mayor (2020–2026): Arnaud Mordant
- Area^{1}: 5.96 km^{2} (2.30 sq mi)
- Elevation: 95 m (312 ft)
- Highest elevation: 127 m (417 ft)
- Lowest elevation: 42 m (138 ft)
- Population (2023): 396
  - Density: 66.4/km^{2} (172/sq mi)
- Time zone: UTC+01:00 (CET)
  - Summer (DST): UTC+02:00 (CEST)
- INSEE/Postal code: 27476 /27500
- ^{1} French Land Register data, which excludes lakes, ponds, glaciers > 1 km^{2} (0.386 sq mi or 247 acres) and river estuaries.

Les Préaux (French pronunciation: [le pʁeo]) is a commune in the Eure department and Normandy region of France.

== Geography ==
The commune along with another 69 communes shares part of a 4,747 hectare, Natura 2000 conservation area, called Risle, Guiel, Charentonne.

== History ==
Several archaeological discoveries carried out on the territory of the commune testify to a human presence since the Neolithic period. Polished axes were brought to light in the nineteenth century. On the plateau of Mont-les-Mares, a Gallo-Roman villa was discovered near the old route traced at the beginning of our era called "Perrey Road".

=== Middle Ages ===
During the High Middle Ages, the topographic features of the valley provided favorable conditions for the foundation of a first abbey, located on the site of the current town hall. This pre-Roman abbey was mentioned in 833 by the Abbé Anségise de Fontenelle.

During the Scandinavian migrations, the monastery was destroyed but not forgotten. In 1033–1034, Onfroy de Vieilles mentioned the presence of the old abbey in the founding charter of the Abbey of Saint-Pierre de Préaux, which was then built on the same site. On this occasion, Préaux is mentioned for the first time in a text in its Latin form Pratellum ("pasture").

In 1050–1051, Onfroy de Vieilles, following the wish of his wife Albérade, founded a second abbey for women, Abbey Saint-Léger, located downstream, which saw 37 abbesses succeed.

The foundation of these two abbeys is of considerable importance for the Préaux territory and the entire region. The charters of the abbeys and lords illustrate the many donations in land and in nature which are provided abbeys. Saint Peter's Abbey became an influential player in the region and oversaw the construction of parish churches. At the end of the 11th century, Saint-Pierre de Préaux was thus at the origin of the parish church Saint-Germain de Pont-Audemer. At the beginning of the 12th century, an abbot himself built a church at Saint-Samson.

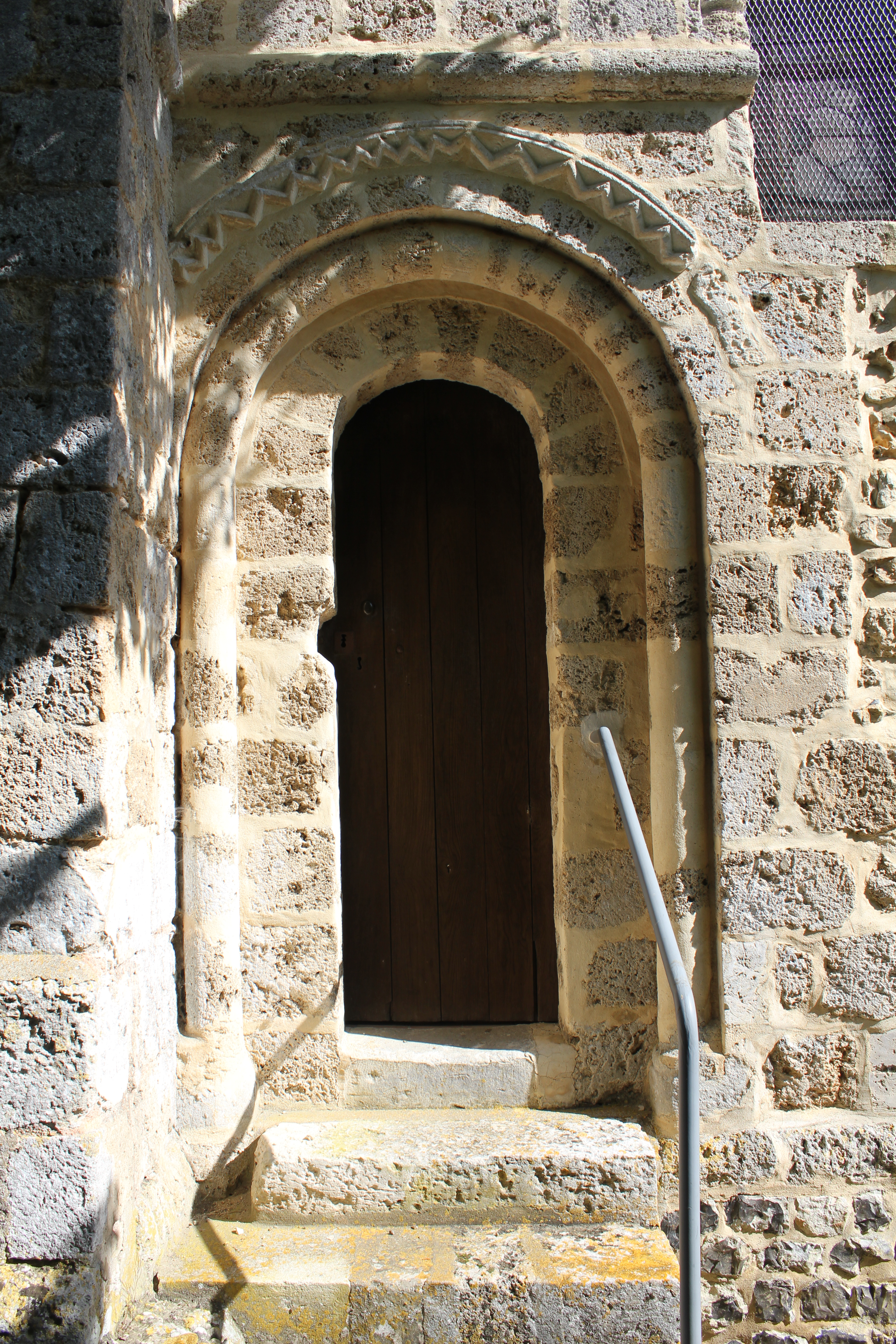
Choir door of the Notre-Dame de Préaux parish church built by Saint-Pierre Abbey at the end of the 11th century

In the immediate vicinity of the abbeys, on the territory of the present commune of Préaux, two parishes were created: the parish of Notre-Dame linked to Saint-Pierre, and the Saint-Michel parish associated with Saint-Léger. Parish churches are created to host mass for laypeople who come to work and live near the abbey.

In the second half of the twelfth century, the monks of St. Peter attempted to found a city next to the monastery. In 1078, a village charter was mentioned in the cartulary. This custom indicates the will to set up a privilege policy in the Préaux to attract "bourgeois" or new inhabitants. The legal status of town implies that the city escaped the feudal authority of a lord. This allowed the inhabitants to escape taxes. At that time, only the city of Pont-Audemer was also called village. We have no knowledge of the characteristics of the custom applied to the Prunes. Musset refers to the laws of Burgundy Breteuil which can give similar examples found in Normandy. In any case, the project of turning the territory into a village was a failure. In 1106, Robert de Meulan, the local lord granted a suburban right only to Pont-Audemer. The village of Préaux was not indicated in the act of the Lord. However, a hamlet really existed since the Middle Ages in the locality. Alfred Canel reports that Préaux is mentioned as a villa in a 14th-century act.

Until the Revolution, the territory of the two parishes of Préaux did not undergo profound changes. The abbeys governed agricultural activities. They owned two farms: the Bosc-Auber farm belonging to Saint-Pierre and the Corbeaumont farm linked to Saint-Léger17. The monasteries also exploited the hydraulic power of the stream. Each of the abbeys has its own mill located in their enclosure and a downstream mill downstream where their vassals were required to grind their wheat.

=== French Revolution ===
The French Revolution was an important turning point in the history of the town. The two abbeys that were the economic engine of the territory were sold as national property. The district of Pont-Audemer, a constituency created by the Revolution, thought to merge the two parishes. These were renamed a time Préaux-la-Montagne for Saint Pierre de Préaux, and Préaux-la-Liberté for Saint Michel de Préaux.

The communes of Notre-Dame-de-Préaux and Saint-Michel-de-Préaux were finally reunited in 1844. The parishes were also merged, and Notre-Dame became the parish church of the town at the expense of the Saint-Michel church sold in 1881. The same year, the town inaugurated its first municipal building: a town hall-school was delivered by the architect Chupeau-Hauteville. In 1904, the public school of boys was transformed into a mixed school, an additional class.

=== Former Chapman Factory building ===
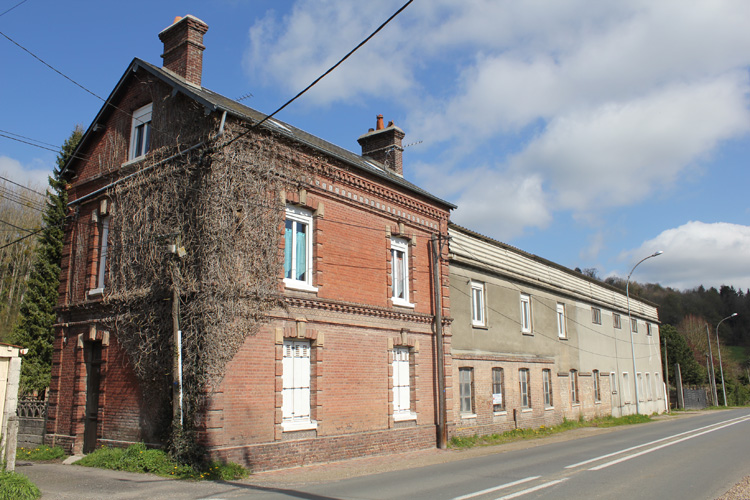
Former Chapman Factory Building

During the 19th century and the first half of the 20th century, the valley experienced a remarkable industrial boom. The four mills formerly belonging to the abbeys were bought by the Revolution and then transformed by bakers and manufacturers. As such, the fate of the mill Saint-Pierre near the Fortin fountain is evocative. Originally a wheat mill, it became a wire laundry in 1855, and hydraulic energy is then used to power a mechanical weaver. In 1868, then in 1885, the factory was successively taken over by companies specializing in the production of fabrics, then waxed or varnished fabrics. The industrial site was booming, several buildings were built, and a steam engine was installed to replace the mill. In 1888, the company was taken over by Chapman, which until the 1930s carried out modernization work to improve the manufacturing process of oilcloths. In 1949, the factory was taken over by the company Les Fils d'Émile Sénéchal. In 1979–1980, the factory stopped its activity.

== Population ==
The population data given in the table below for 1841 and earlier are excluding the former commune of Saint-Michel-de-Préaux, absorbed in 1844.

Historical population

Year	Pop.	±% p.a.
1793	399	—
1821	345	−0.52%
1841	353	+0.11%
1846	420	+3.54%
1872	468	+0.42%
1901	345	−1.05%
1926	315	−0.36%
1946	297	−0.29%
1962	309	+0.25%

Year	Pop.	±% p.a.
1968	345	+1.85%
1975	331	−0.59%
1982	313	−0.80%
1990	409	+3.40%
1999	417	+0.22%
2007	436	+0.56%
2012	430	−0.28%
2017	377	−2.60%
2023	396	+0.82%

Source: EHESS and INSEE (1968-2023)

== Notable people ==
- Guillaume de Poitiers (born in the Préaux around 1020), chronicler, author of a story of William the Conqueror
- Maxime Legendre (1861-1911), lawyer and politician; died in the Préaux

== See also ==
- Communes of the Eure department
