= Torf =

Torf, Seigneur de Torville, was a Norman baron. His parentage is unknown.

Born in the early 10th century, he possessed numerous lordships in Normandy, including Seigneur de Torville, Torcy, Torny, Torly, and de Ponteautorf.

Torf's children included:

- Turold de Pont-Audemer, Sire de Ponteaudemer, married Duvelina
- Turchetil, Seigneur de Turqueville
- William de Torville

== Sources ==
- Hagger, Mark S. (2017). Norman Rule in Normandy, 911-1144. Boydell Press.
