= Beaumont-le-Roger =

- Commune
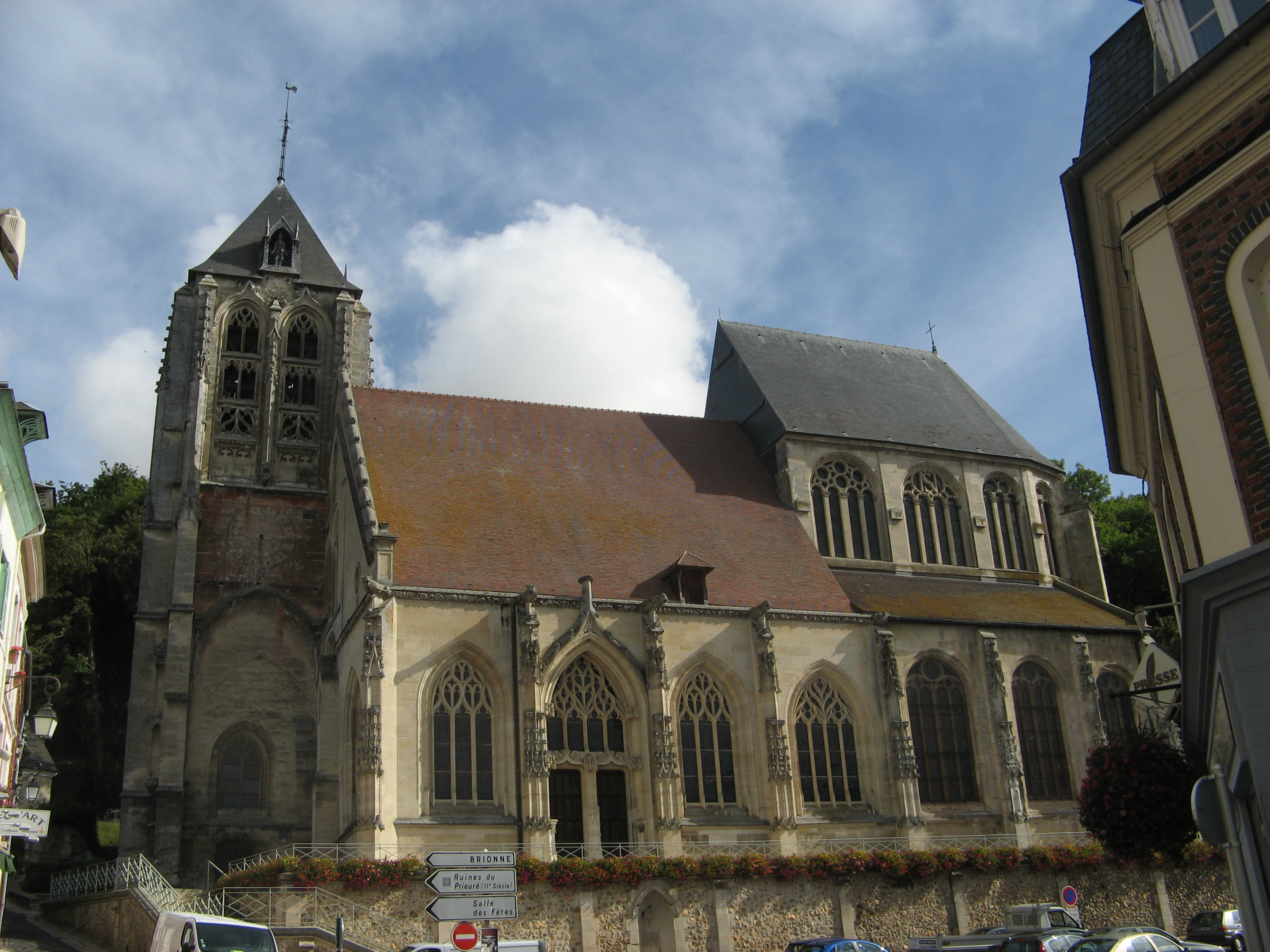
- The Church Saint-Nicolas (2010)

- Coat of arms
- Location of Beaumont-le-Roger
- Location within France Location within Normandy
- Coordinates: 49°04′51″N 0°46′41″E
- Country: France
- Region: Normandy
- Department: Eure
- Arrondissement: Bernay
- Canton: Brionne

Government
  - Mayor (2020–2026): Jean-Pierre Le Roux
- Area^{1}: 36.42 km^{2} (14.06 sq mi)
- Elevation: 80 m (260 ft)
- Highest elevation: 163 m (535 ft)
- Lowest elevation: 84 m (276 ft)
- Population (2023): 2,769
  - Density: 76.03/km^{2} (196.9/sq mi)
- Time zone: UTC+01:00 (CET)
  - Summer (DST): UTC+02:00 (CEST)
- INSEE/Postal code: 27051 /27170
- ^{1} French Land Register data, which excludes lakes, ponds, glaciers > 1 km^{2} (0.386 sq mi or 247 acres) and river estuaries.

Beaumont-le-Roger (French pronunciation: [bomɔ̃ lə ʁɔʒe]) is a commune in the department of Eure in Normandy region in northern France.

== Geography ==
The commune is located in the valley of the Risle on the edge of the forest with which it shares its name. It is crossed by the Paris-Cherbourg railway line, on which it has a station. The Beaumont forest covers four communes; it is the largest private forest in Normandy.

The commune along with another 69 communes shares part of a 4,747 hectare, Natura 2000 conservation area, called Risle, Guiel, Charentonne.

== History ==
Humphrey (or Honfroy, Onfroi or Umfrid) de Vieilles (died c. 1044) was the first holder of the "grand honneur" of Beaumont-le-Roger, one of the most important groups of domains in eastern Normandy and the founder of the House of Beaumont. He was married to Albreda or Alberée de la Haye Auberie. His son, Roger de Beaumont, a powerful 11th century lord and adviser to William the Conqueror, derived his family name from Beaumont, of which his family were lords.

== Population ==
Historical population
Year	Pop.	±% p.a.
1968	2,871	—
1975	2,828	−0.22%
1982	2,711	−0.60%
1990	2,694	−0.08%
1999	2,818	+0.50%
2007	2,928	+0.48%
2012	2,978	+0.34%
2017	2,879	−0.67%
2023	2,769	−0.65%
Source: INSEE

== See also ==
- Communes of the Eure department
