= Guihomar V of Léon =

Guihomar V of Léon (died after 14 March 1216 (Note: King John granted safe conduct to Guihomar and his wife Maencia on 14 March 1216.)) was a Viscount of Léon, son of Guihomar IV.

== Life ==
After the death of Guihomar IV, who had submitted to the ducal power not long before, Henry II confiscated the Viscount's estates. After Morlaix was confiscated by Duke Geoffrey II Plantagenet, Guihomar IV's two sons, Guihomar V and Harvey I, recovered their inheritance. Guihomar V received the castellanies of Lesneven, Brest, Saint-Renan and Le Conquet as well as the title of Viscount of Léon. Harvey I received the estates of Landerneau and Daoudour, as well as the lordship of Coat-Méal. Being a juveigneur, Harvey had to content himself with the title of Lord of Léon, which he passed on to his heirs, founding the junior branch of the House of Léon. The Lords of Léon settle in the castle of La Roche-Maurice.

In 1192, he and his wife Maencia made a donation to the priory of Locmaria.

In 1196, after Duchess Constance was imprisoned by her husband Ranulf of Chester, Guihomar, his brother Harvey and several other Breton lords rebelled and took Constance's son Arthur away from his uncle Richard.

== Issue ==
Guihomar V married a woman named Maencia. They had three or four children:

- Guihomar, who died before his father
- Conan, who succeeded his father;
- Salomon or Soliman (died after 1225), who rebelled with his brother Conan against Duke Peter Mauclerc in 1216/22;
- Maybe Tanguy, father of Bernard.

== Sources ==
- Kernévez, Patrick; Bourgès, André-Yves (2007). "Généalogie des vicomtes de Léon (XIe, XIIe, XIIIe siècles)". Bulletin de la Société archéologique du Finistère. CXXXVI.
- Morvan, Frederic (2009). La Chevalerie bretonne et la formation de l'armee ducale, 1260-1341 (in French). Presses Universitaires de Rennes.
