= List of barons of Vitré =

This is a list of the Barons of Vitré, who ruled from 1008 to the French Revolution. In seven centuries, the Barony of Vitré was ruled by four great families: the House of Vitré (1008-1254), the second House of Laval (1254-1547), the House of Montfort-Laval (1547-1605) and the House of La Trémoille-Laval (1605-1792). The family of Goranton-Hervé, who ruled Vitré a short time during Robert II's reign, also ruled the barony.

Arms of Andrew IV of Vitré

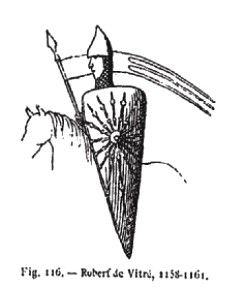
Seal of Robert III of Vitré

== House of Vitré ==
- c. 1008-1040 Riwallon the Vicar, follower of Geoffrey I, Duke of Brittany, baron of Vitré (vicarius miles vice dominus),
  married Guenergauda (Gwenargant), maybe related to the Episcopal House of Rennes and sired:
- c. 1040-1050 Tristan or Driscam of Vitré, Baron of Vitré, their son,
  married Innoguen of Fougères and sired:
- ???? - c. 1072 Robert I (c. 1034 † c. 1072), Lord of Vitré, their son,
  married in 1060 Bertha (c. 1039 † c. 1109), daughter of Guérin, Lord of Craon, and sired:
  Ennoguen a.k.a. "Domitille" (born after 1060), Lady of Craon
  married c. 1070 Renaud (c. 1060 † c. December 1101), Lord of Craon, et,
  Robert († c. 1106), Philip and Guy of Vitré, and,
- c. 1072 - 1135 Andrew I (c. 1064 † 1135), Lord of Vitré :
  married before 1087 Agnes (born c. 1070), daughter of Robert, Count of Mortain, and sired:
  Marquise of Vitré (c. 1105 † after 1162), and:
  Gervase of Vitré, Lord of Acigné, and:
- 1135 - 1154 Robert II (1095 † 1154), Lord of Vitré, their son, became a monk in 1146,
  married Constance of Mayenne (c. 1095 † before 1130), daughter of Juhel of Mayenne, and sired:
  Andrew of Vitré Lord of Acigné c. 1120 † 28 June 1145, and,
- 1154 - 1173 Robert III (c. 1118 † 11 November 1173 in Savigny), Lord of Vitré, their son who, in battle against Conan IV, Duke of Brittany, had to seek refuge in the lands of Guy IV of Lavaln, re-establishing himself in a castle at Launay-Villiers.
  He married firstly Alix of Fougères (c. 1115 † before 1137), daughter of Henry, Baron of Fougères, without issue, then,
  married c. 1137 Havoise of Châteaubriant (c. 1115 † before 1139), without issue, then,
  married in 1139 "Emma" or Anne of Dinan (c. 1130 † before 1186), daughter of Alan, Lord of Dinan, and sired:
- 1173-1211 Andrew II † September 1211,
  married Matilda of Mayenne (born c. 1150), daughter of Geoffrey III, Lord of Mayenne, marriage annulled c. 1190.
  married Enoguen of Léon (born c. 1168), daughter of Guihomar IV, Viscount of Léon, and sired:
  Emma of Vitré (born c. 1191),
  married in May 1207 Alard IV of Château-Gontier (c. 1180 † 1226, buried in the Abbey of Bellebranche), Lord of Château-Gontier,
  married Eustacie of Rays, daughter of Harscoët of Rays, c. 1199, and sired:
  Andrew III,
  Eleanor of Vitré,
  married in 1210 John of Dol, Lord of Combourg (present at the Battle of Bouvines),
  Constance of Vitré,
  married in 1225 Alan of Coëtmen (c. 1200 † after 1260), Viscount of Tonquédec,
  married Luce Paynel, sister of Fulk Paynel, without issue.
  Alan of Vitré, a.k.a. Alan of Dinan (1155 † before 1197), Lord of Vitré, Lord of Dinan, 3rd Lord of Bécherel, Seneschal of Brittany,
  married Clemencia of Fougères (c. 1175 † 1252), daughter of William of Fougères, and sired:
  Gervasia of Vitré (c. 1190 † after June 1248), Lady of Dinan, and Bécherel,
  Eleanor of Vitré (c. 1170 † 12 August 1233),
  married firstly William of Salisbury, 2nd Earl of Salisbury († 1196), then,
  married Geldwin II of Dol († c. 1231), son of John III of Dol, Lord of Combourg,

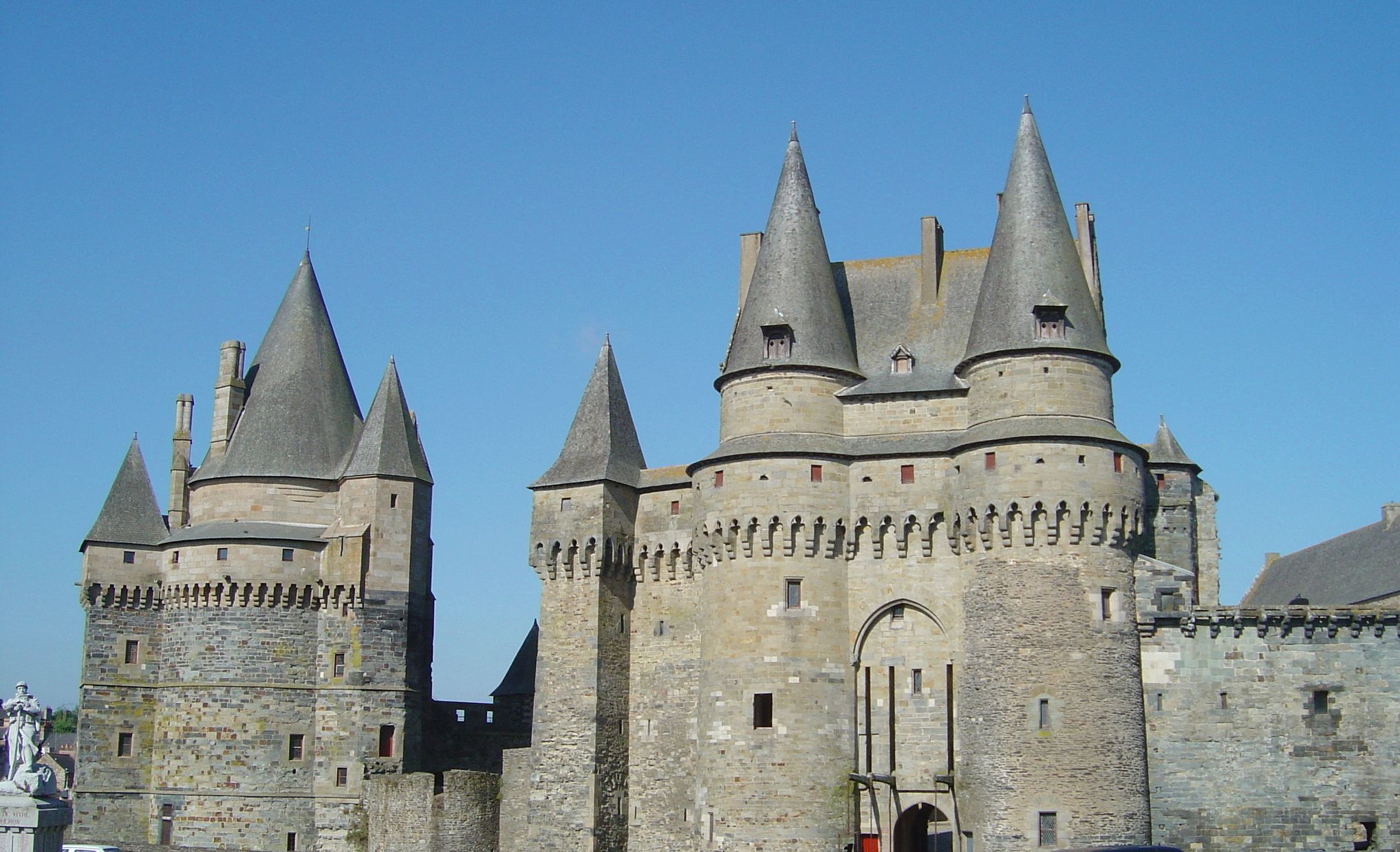
The Château de Vitré : The castellum and the tower Saint-Laurent

- 1211-1250 Andrew III (c. 1180 † 8 February 1250 in Mansoura, Egypt), Baron of Vitré, Andrew II and Eustacie of Rays' son,
  married in 1212 Catherine of Thouars (1201 † 1239/40), Lady of Aubigné, daughter of Guy of Thouars, Regent of Brittany
  married in 1240 Thomasse de La Guerche (born c. 1215), Lady of Mareuil, daughter of William of La Guerche, Lord of Pouancé
- 1250 - 1251 Andrew IV (after 1247/1248 † 15 March 1251), Baron of Vitré, their son,
- 1251 - 1254 Philippette or Philippa (c. 1225 † 16 September 1254 in Paris), Lady of Vitré Aubigné, his paternal half-sister,
  married in 1239 Guy VII (after 1215 † 1267), Lord of Laval (1264-1267), son of Matthew II of Montmorency, Lord of Montmorency and Emma, Lady of Laval.

== Second House of Laval ==
- 1254 - 1267 Guy VII (after 1215 † 1267), Baron of Vitré, Lord of Laval (1264-1267), Lord of Acquigny, Hérouville, Aubigné and Olivet
  married in 1239 Philippette or Philippa (c. 1225 † 16 September 1254 in Paris), Lady of Vitré and Aubigné,
  married c. 1257 Thomasse of La Guerche (born c. 1215), Lady of Mareuil, daughter of William of La Guerche, Lord of Pouancé, widow of Andrew III, Baron of Vitré,
- Guy VIII, (1267-1295);
- Guy IX, (1295-1333);
- Guy X, (1333-1347);
- Guy XI, (1347-1348);
- Guy XII, (1348-1412);
- Guy XIII, (1412-1414);
- Anne, (1414-1429);
- Guy XIV, (1429-1486),
- Guy XV, (1486-1500);
- Guy XVI, (1500-1531);
- Guy XVII, (1531-1547);

== House of Montfort-Laval, Rieux-Laval ==
- Guyonne de Laval (1547-1567) and her husband Guy XVIII;
- Guy XIX, (1567-1586);
- Guy XX, (1586-1605);

== House of La Trémoille-Laval ==
- Henri Charles de la Trémoille (1604-1674);
- Charles III Belgique Hollande de la Trémoille (1674-1709);
- Charles IV Louis Bretagne de la Trémoille (1709-1719);
- Charles V René Armand de la Trémoille (1719-1741);
- Jean-Bretagne-Charles de la Trémoille (1741-1792)

== See also ==
- House of Laval
- Vitré, Ille-et-Vilaine
- Château de Vitré

== Sources ==
- Michel Brand'Honneur Manoirs et châteaux dans le comté de Rennes. Habitat à motte et société chevaleresques (XIe-XII siècles) Presses Universitaires de Rennes Rennes (2001) Table 33 page 290.
- Jacques Le Blanc de la Vignolle, Généalogies de la maison de Laval
- Amédée Guillotin de Corson Les grandes seigneuries de Haute-Bretagne II, 2 Volumes 1897-1899 réédition Le Livre d'Histoire, Paris (1999)
