= Andrew II, Baron of Vitré =

Andrew II

Baron of Vitré
- Reign: 11 November 1173 – 9 June 1211
- Born: c. 1150
- Died: 1211 (aged 60–61)
- Spouse: Matilda of Mayenne, Enoguen of Léon, Eustacie of Rays, Luce Paynel
- Issue: Emma, Andrew, Eleanor, Constance
- House: House of Vitré
- Father: Robert III of Vitré
- Mother: Emma of Dinan

Andrew II of Vitré (c. 1150 – 9 June 1211) was Baron de Vitré from 1173 to 1211.

== Life ==
Andrew was the eldest son of Robert III, Baron of Vitré and his wife Emma of Dinan, daughter of Alan of Dinan. He fought for King Henry II Plantagenet in 1168, and succeeded his father in 1173.

In the early 1180s, Andrew took part to an armed pilgrimage to the Holy Land and came back to Brittany a few years later. In 1185, he was one of the noblemen who were present at the Assize of Count Geoffroy.

In 1196, the duchess of Brittany, Constance, was abducted and imprisoned by her husband Ranulf de Blondeville. Andrew rebelled along with several other Breton barons. He agreed to send his daughter Emma, who was his only heiress at the time, as an hostage to Richard the Lionheart, in exchange for de Constance's release.

== Marriages and issue ==
Andrew first married, before 1173, Matilda of Mayenne, daughter of Geoffrey III, Lord of Mayenne, and Constance of Cornouaille (daughter of Duke Conan III, Duke of Brittany). They had no issue and the marriage was annulled in 1190, due to consanguinity.

He married secondly Enoguen of Léon, daughter of Guihomar IV, Viscount of Léon and his wife Nobilis. They had:

- Emma, who was hostage in August 1196 and married Alard IV, Lord of Château-Gontier in 1207;
- Eleanor, who married John of Dol, Lord of Combourg in 1210.

Enoguen died at an unknown date and Andrew married Eustacie of Rays, daughter of Harscoët of Rays on 3 March 1199. They had:

- Andrew III, who succeeded his father and married Catherine of Thouars, daughter of Constance, Duchess of Brittany and Guy of Thouars
- Constance, who married Alan of Coëtmen, Viscount of Tonquédec, around 1225.

Eustacie died before 7 December 1209 and Andrew soon married Luce Paynel, sister of Fulk Paynel. They had no issue.

== Sources ==
- Everard, Judith; Jones, Michael, eds. (1999). The Charters of Duchess Constance and her Family, 1171-1221. The Boydell Press.
