= Conan I of Léon =

Conan I of Léon (c. 1171 – before 1231), called "the Short", was a Viscount of Léon. Supporting Duke Arthur I of Brittany, they were captured during the siege of Mirebeau. Released in 1205, he defended his nephew's rights to the County of Penthievre. Conan joined other lords in revolt against Duke Peter I of Brittany, the rebellion ended in 1222.

== Life ==
Conan was the son of Guihomar V, Viscount of Léon and Margilie of Rohan. Conan's father Guihomar had been Duchess Constance's ally and had rebelled when she had been imprisoned by her second husband Ranulf of Chester. After Constance's death, Conan supported her son Arthur I, in his fight against his uncle John Lackland for the Crown of England. Arthur and Conan were captured by John's army in 1202 while they were besieging Mirebeau. Conan was imprisoned in the castle of Chinon and was released in June 1205 by the King Philip II of France.

Conan was the guardian of his nephew by marriage, young Henry II of Avaugour, together with his brother-in-law Geslin of Penthièvre. He tried to defend Henry's rights against the new Duke Peter Mauclerc, who had spoiled him of the County of Penthièvre, Henry's inheritance, which he later gave to his daughter Yolande.

Between 1214 and 1216, Léon was invaded by Peter, who conquered Lesneven in 1216. Conan the Short then took part to the revolt led by many Breton lords, which was quelled at the Battle of Châteaubriant in 1222. The lords had accept Peter, who had married Constance's daughter Alix of Thouars, as the new Duke of Brittany.

== Issue ==
Conan I married Alix, daughter of Henry I of Avaugour c. 1195. They had:

- Guihomar VI who succeeded his father.

== Sources ==
- Patrick Kernévez, André-Yves Bourgès. Généalogie des vicomtes de Léon (XIe, XIIe et XIIIe siècles). Bulletin de la Société archéologique du Finistère, volume CXXXVI, 2007, p. 157-188.
- Morvan, Frederic (2009). La Chevalerie bretonne et la formation de l'armee ducale, 1260-1341 (in French). Presses Universitaires de Rennes.
- Powicke, Maurice (1913). The Loss of Normandy, 1198-1204. Manchester University Press.
