= Catherine of Thouars =

- Baroness consort of Vitré
- Born: 1201
- Died: 1237/1240
- Spouse: Andrew III, Baron of Vitré
- Issue: Philippa, Baroness of Vitré; Eustachie of Vitré; Alix of Vitré
- House: Thouars
- Father: Guy of Thouars
- Mother: Constance, Duchess of Brittany

Catherine of Thouars was the daughter of Constance, suo jure Duchess of Brittany and Countess of Richmond, and her third husband Guy of Thouars. She was the first wife of Andrew III, Baron of Vitré.

== Family ==
Catherine was the second daughter of Constance, Duchess of Brittany, and Guy of Thouars. Her mother died soon after she was born. Catherine had a twin sister, Margaret, and their mother might have died because of a difficult delivery After her mother's death, her father married Eustachie of Chemillé, and had two sons, Peter and Thomas.

Catherine was the younger half-sister of Eleanor, Matilda and Arthur, Constance and Geoffrey of England's children, the sister of Alix and Margaret, and the elder half-sister of Peter and Thomas of Chemillé, Guy and Eustachie of Chemillé's sons.

== Union and issue ==
In 1212, Catherine married Andrew III, Baron of Vitré, whose father Andrew II had been Constance's ally. They had three children:

- Philippa of Vitré, who married Guy VII, Lord of Laval;
- Eustachie, who married Geoffrey I Botherel, Lord of Quintin;
- Alix, who married Fulk of Mathefelon (c. 1200 † c. 1269), Lord of Azay.

== Portrayals in literature ==
Catherine of Thouars appears as a secondary character in the novels Le Poids d’une couronne (légende bretonne) (1867–1868) by Gabrielle d’Étampes and El Viaje de los Siete Demonios (1974) by Manuel Mujica Lainez. She is also mentioned in the novel Dans l’Ombre du Passé (2020) by Léa Chaillou, where it is revealed that the heroine's sister is named after her.

== See also ==
- Constance, Duchess of Brittany
- Guy of Thouars
