= Viscounty of Léon =

Former country in Brittany

Historical regions in Brittany

The Viscounty or County of Léon (Breton: Kontelezh Leon) was a feudal state in extreme western Brittany in the High Middle Ages. Though nominally a vassal of the sovereign duke of Brittany, Léon was functionally independent of any external controls until the viscounts came under attack by King Henry II of England. It thus became the focus of revolts and wars when Brittany was drawn into the Angevin empire.

The history of Léon's early counts is obscure. The original viscounts of Léon were public officials appointed by the counts of Cornouaille, but by the mid-eleventh century they had usurped public authority in their province. Their ability to remain independent of both count and duke was likely due to their remoteness in the extremity of the Armorican peninsula. Unlike their Breton neighbours they did not participate in the Norman conquest of England in 1066. Count Harvey II, however, did participate on the side of Stephen of Blois in the nineteen years of civil war in England called The Anarchy.

The viscounts also fought with the duke of Brittany in attempts to maintain their independence. Henry II had ordered Duke Conan IV of Brittany to march against Léon. Conan IV's son-in-law and eventual successor, Henry II's son, Geoffrey II, went to war against Viscount Guihomar IV of Léon. In the course of these wars most of the castles of the viscounts of Léon were razed and Guihomar's lands—his source of revenue—were significantly reduced. These conflicts over authority in Léon continued down to the reign of John II.

In 1235 the subvassals of Léon and Penthièvre brought a series of complaints, the Communes petitiones Britonum, against the duke, Peter of Dreux, to King Louis IX of France. They claimed that the viscounts of Léon had never theretofore been subject to the custody of or relief from the duke nor had they been required to seek permission for the construction of fortresses. They had always had the right of wreck, that is, a monopoly on shipwrecks and their cargoes on the coasts. They had the right to draw up testaments and to dispense with alms and make arrangements for debt-payment freely. The duke, they said, did not have a right to exact oaths of homage from the viscount's men and the viscount had the right of placitum spade ("pleas of the sword"). The right of wreck alone yielded 100,000 solidi per annum in revenues from a single rock on the treacherous coast, which an earlier viscount, Guihomar IV, had called his "most precious stone."

Panorama of Brest from the pont de Recouvrance of the Château de Brest and the Tour Tanguy. The Château was ceded by the Viscount of Leon to the Duke of Brittany

The territory of Léon was preserved in the Bishopric of Léon. It is now part of the department of Finistère. One place within the former viscounty that continues to preserve many examples of medieval architecture, such as the church of Notre Dame du Kreisker, is the town of Saint-Pol-de-Léon.

== List of viscounts ==
- Even, a semi-legendary nobleman who lived c. 900.
- Maybe Alan I of Léon, father of Guihomar I.
- Guihomar I (fl. c. 1021-1055).
  - Morvan (fl. c. 1050). According to French historian Joëlle Quaghebeur, Morvan was not a viscount of Léon but a nobleman from Cornouaille.
- Alan II of Léon, son of Guihomar
  - Ehuarn (fl. c. 1066-1084), Morvan's son. Likewise, Joëlle Quaghebeur thinks Ehuarn was not a viscount of Léon but a nobleman from Cornouaille.
- Guihomar II (died 1103), who is said to have been Guihomar I's grandson.
- Harvey I (died after 1128).
- Guihomar III (died c. 1157).
- Harvey II (died c. 1168).
- Guihomar IV (died 1179).
- Guihomar V (died after 1216) controlled only a small portion of Leon; fought on the side of Duchess Constance and Duke Arthur I.
- Conan I, (died before 1231) fought and was captured with Duke Arthur I; later attacked by Duke Peter I. Lost the Battle of Chateaubriant in 1222, a rebellion of Breton nobles, which established the authority of Duchess Alix and Duke Peter I.
- Guihomar VI (died c. 1239), rebelled against Duke John I in 1237
- Harvey III (c. 1239 - c. 1265), ceded the town, port and chateau of Brest to the duke of Brittany in 1240
- Harvey IV (c. 1271 - c. 1298), sold much of the remaining riches of the viscounty
- Amé, daughter of Harvey IV, sold all her rights and definitively renounced them in 1298; the line of the viscounts of Leon becomes extinct
- Large portions of Viscounty held in the domain of the duke of Brittany (1179 - 1269)
- Peter of Brittany (1269-1312), son of Duke John II granted the viscountship by his father- to settle his debts, Peter resold the viscountship to his brother Duke Arthur II of Brittany in 1293. The lordship (or "honour") of Leon passed to the House of Rohan in 1363. (Note: Descendants of the House of Rohan used the title prince of Leon beginning 1530. The viscount of Leon was supposed to be a junior title to that of duke of Brittany. When Duchess Anne became queen of France, the House of Rohan asserted that the joining of the Breton ducal crown to the crown of France meant that the descendants of Leon were entitled to use the title prince. One modern day descendant asserts the use of the now self-granted courtesy title.)

== Sources ==
- Everard, Judith A. Brittany and the Angevins: Province and Empire, 1158–1203. Cambridge: Cambridge University Press, 2000. ISBN 0-521-66071-8.
