= Andrew III, Baron of Vitré =

Andrew III
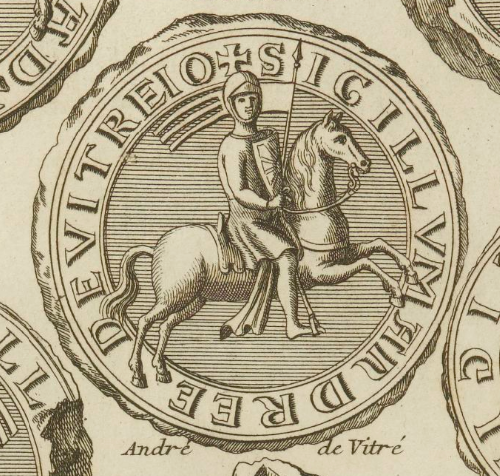

Baron of Vitré
- Reign: 9 June 1211 – 1250
- Born: c. 1200
- Died: 1250 (aged 49–50)
- Spouse: Catherine of Thouars, Thomasse of La Guerche
- Issue: Philippa, Andrew
- House: House of Vitré
- Father: Andrew II of Vitré
- Mother: Eustacie of Rays

Andrew III of Vitré (c. 1200 † 8 February 1250 at the Battle of Al Mansurah, in Egypt) was Baron of Vitré and Aubigné from 1211 to 1250.

== Life ==
Andrew was the eldest son of Andrew II, Baron of Vitré, and his third wife Eustacie of Rays, daughter of Harscoët of Rays. He founded the old convent of the Jacobins in Nantes in 1228.

In c. 1230, Andrew rebuilt the Château de Vitré and surrounded it with fortifications that encompassed the Vieil-Bourg and the church of Notre-Dame of Vitré. He also founded the castle of Chevré, a lordship belonging to the Barony of Vitré. He took part in the Seventh Crusade in 1248 with Louis IX of France and died at the Battle of Al Mansurah.

In his last will and testament dated 1248, Andrew of Vitré gave his wife le chastel de Chasteillon, le moulin de l'estangs doud. lieu et Vendelays o touz ses appartenances (the castle of Chasteillon, the mill by the pond of the aforementioned place and Vendelays and all its dependencies). One of the executors was Guillaume Merlin, dean of Mayenne.

== Marriages and issue ==
Andrew III married twice. He married firstly in 1212 Catherine of Thouars Lady of Aubigné, daughter of Constance, Duchess of Brittany, and Guy of Thouars. They had:

- Philippa, who married Guy VII, Lord of Laval. She succeeded her younger brother and brought the Barony of Vitré into the House of Laval;
- Eustacie, who married Geoffrey I Botherel, Lord of Quintin
- Alix, who married Fulk III of Mathefelon (c. 1200 † c. 1269), Lord of Azé.

Andrew married secondly around January 1240 Thomasse of La Guerche, Lady of Pouancé and Mareuil. They had:

- Joan;
- Philippa [II] nun at the Abbey of Longchamp, who received lands in Normandy;
- Margaret, who married Aimery of Argenton and also received lands in Normandy as her dowry;
- Aliette, who married William of Villiers;
- Eustacie [II], Lady of Les Huguetières, who married Oliver I of Machecoul around 1268
- Andrew IV (c. 1247/48 † 15 March 1251)

== See also ==
- Château de Vitré

== Sources ==
- Mairie of Vitré
- Amédée Guillotin de Corson Les grandes seigneuries de Haute-Bretagne II, 2 Volumes 1897-1899, new edition Le Livre d'Histoire, Paris (1999)
- Everard, Judith; Jones, Michael, eds. (1999). The Charters of Duchess Constance and her Family, 1171-1221. The Boydell Press.
- Morvan, Frédéric (2009). La Chevalerie de Bretagne et la formation de l'armée ducale 1260-1341. Presses Universitaires de Rennes.
- Walsby, Malcolm (2007). The Counts of Laval: Culture, Patronage and Religion in Fifteenth- and Sixteenth-Century France. Ashgate Publishing.
