= Harvey IV of Léon =

Harvey IV of Léon (after 1244 – after 1298) was Viscount of Léon. He succeeded his father Harvey III.

== Life ==
Born in 1244, Harvey was the son of Harvey III, Viscount of Léon and Marguerite of Dinan-Montafilant.

On 7 June 1254, Harvey's father Harvey III had to borrow 300 livres from John I, and later important sums difficult to pay back, in order to pay his debts. In May 1265, Harvey IV, then a minor, was married to Catherine of Laval, daughter of Guy VII, Lord of Laval and Philippa de Vitré.

Harvey IV squandered the family fortune in about ten years (1265–1275). By November 1265, Harvey IV first leased the customs of the Abbey of Saint-Mathieu for the next seven years for a fee of 3,000 livres. He extended this contract to seventeen years as early as 1271. In 1273, he started selling different small fiefs, before selling definitively the port of Saint-Mathieu and its customs to Peter of Brittany on behalf of his father Duke John I for a fee of 16,000 livres in August 1275.

Harvey IV had already sold him on 17 February 1274 the town and castle of Le Conquet for a fee of 1,500 livres, Plouarzel and Plougonvelin for a fee of 4,000 livres the same year, Saint-Renan, the castle of Damani and all his remaining properties in the three Bishoprics of Léon, Tréguier and Cornouaille, that is to say the remaining of his estate, on 26 October 1276 for a fee of 7,210 livres. This charter was confirmed the same month by Harvey's sister Amé of Léon and her husband Rolland of Dinan-Montafilant.

In 1277, the Duke had to give Harvey jadis viscomte de Léon (formerly Viscount of Léon) a good horse for him to go on Crusade, but Harvey sold it before he left.

Harvey died after 1298, the year when his only daughter and heiress Anné of Léon confirmed in her turn the sale of the Viscounty of Léon.

== Issue ==
Harvey IV married Catherine of Laval. Catherine received financial compensations from Dukes John I and John II of Brittany in 1281 and 1306. After the sale of the Viscounty, she was called « jadis vicomtesse de Léon » (formerly Viscountess of Léon). (Note: Charter dated 1306 during the payment made by the executors of the testament of Duke John II of Brittany) They had:

- Anné of Léon, who married Prigent de Coëtmen, Viscount of Tonquédec before 1298.

== Sources ==
- Arthur Le Moyne de La Borderie, Nouveau recueil d'actes inédits des Ducs de Bretagne et de leur gouvernement (XIIIe et XIVe siècles) « Acquêt du comté de Léon par le duc de Bretagne » p. 211-247.
- Morvan, Frederic (2009). La Chevalerie bretonne et la formation de l'armee ducale, 1260-1341 (in French). Presses Universitaires de Rennes.
- Morvan, Frédéric (2012). "Le Léon féodal au XIIIᵉ siècle". Société d’histoire et d’archéologie de Bretagne. Mémoires de la Société d’histoire et d’archéologie de Bretagne (in French). Vol. XC. Société d’histoire et d’archéologie de Bretagne. pp. 37–58.
- Patrick Kernévez, André-Yves Bourgès Généalogie des vicomtes de Léon (XIe, XIIe et XIIIe siècles). Bulletin de la Société archéologique du Finistère, volume CXXXVI, 2007, p. 157-188.
