= Guihomar IV of Léon =

Guihomar, Guidomar, or Guyomar IV (c. 1130–1179) was the Viscount of Léon from 1168 until his death. He was the son and successor of Harvey II. His reign was spent in constant rebellion against his nominal lords in an effort to preserve his historical independence.

== Life ==
In August 1167 Henry II of England marched on Léon and captured or razed Guihomar's major castles, forcing the baron to submit and grant hostages. Guihomar succeeded his father soon after. He followed his father in trying to preserve his de facto independence from ducal authority and foreign influence. Most especially he sought to protect his economic interest in the right of wreck, famously declaring that he possessed "the most valuable of precious stones," a rock which generated 100,000 solidi per annum in revenue due to shipwrecks.

By 1169 Guihomar was in revolt and Henry ordered Conan IV of Brittany, who was also lord of Tréguier, which conveniently marched on Léon, to put down the disturbance. Conan campaigned against him in 1170, defeating him once but failing to secure his submission. After Conan's death in February 1171, Guihomar rebelled once more and Henry himself, marching from Pontorson, led the campaign against him, which culminated in the loss of his castles, all of which were razed save three which Henry kept. Guihomar formally submitted in May at Pontorson. He was ordered to return all lands confiscated from his neighbours or vassals or submit to royal judgement (coram rege).

In January 1171 Guihomar had ordered the murder of his younger brother, Hamo, Bishop of Saint-Pol de Léon. The parallels between this and the murder of Thomas Becket (1170), of which Henry was accused, probably encouraged decisive action on the king's part, so as to present himself as a defender of the assassinated churchman.

In August 1177 Henry's son, Geoffrey II of Brittany, at his father's request, led a campaign against Guihomar, who was again in rebellion. Guihomar submitted his lands to Henry, but by April 1179 was in revolt once again. It was his final revolt. Geoffrey, at his father's request, again led the campaign against him, but he was harsher this second time, confiscating the whole of Léon to the Duchy of Brittany. Guihomar agreed to undergo a pilgrimage to Jerusalem and subsist in the meanwhile off the revenues of two parishes until the following Christmas, but he died on 27 or 28 September 1179 before any of this could take place.

== Issue ==
Guihomar married Nobilis (possibly a member of the de Châteaulin family); they had:

- Guihomar V (c. 1151 – aft. 1216), who succeeded his father as Viscount of Léon
- Harvey (1153–1208), who became the first Lord of Léon as Harvey I
- Adam, who participated in the Third Crusade and died in 1190 or 1191 at the Siege of Acre
- Eleanor (d. aft. 1191), who married Rivoallon, Lord of Rosmadec, before 1191
- Enoguen/Gwen, who married Andrew II, Baron of Vitré about 1190
- Sybille (d. aft. 1166) married Geoffrey of Boisgelin
- An unnamed daughter, referred to as Eleanor or Jeanne in later genealogies; she married Odo II, Viscount of Porhoët and Duke of Brittany from 1148 to 1156, and has at times been identified with either Eleanor or Enoguen/Guen (Gallicised as Jeanne)

== Sources ==
- Chaillou, Léa (2019). "The House of Léon: Genealogy and Origins". Foundations. 11: 19–48.
- Everard, J. A. (2000). Brittany and the Angevins: Province and Empire, 1158–1203. Cambridge University Press. ISBN 0-521-66071-8.
- Kernévez, Patrick; Bourgès, André-Yves (2008). "Généalogie des vicomtes de Léon (XIe, XIIe et XIIIe siècles)". Bulletin de la Société archéologique du Finistère (in French). 136: 157–188.
- Morvan, Frederic (2009). La Chevalerie bretonne et la formation de l'armee ducale, 1260-1341 (in French). Presses Universitaires de Rennes.
