= Guihomar VI of Léon =

Guihomar VI of Léon (bef. 1200–c. 1239) was the Viscount of Léon. He revolted against Duke Peter of Brittany. Guihomar paid homage to Louis IX in 1231. By 1237, he recognized Duke John I of Brittany as his liege. Guihomar died in 1239.

== Life ==
Guihomar was the son of Conan I, Viscount of Léon and Alix of Treguier. Guihomar may have taken part to the Battle of Bouvines in 1214 and in 1222 he rebelled against Peter Mauclerc, Alix of Thouars's husband, with several other Breton lords. In 1231 he did homage to the French King Louis IX for all his lands, out of defiance towards Peter, who was supported by the English King Henry III.

However, in 1237, he paid homage to the new Duke John I the Red, but soon entered into conflict with him as well.

Guihomar VI died around 1239.

== Issue ==
Guihomar may have married Marie of Penthievre. They had a son:

- Harvey III, who succeeded his father

== Sources ==
- Patrick Kernévez, André-Yves Bourgès Généalogie des vicomtes de Léon (XIe, XIIe et XIIIe siècles). Bulletin de la Société archéologique du Finistère, volume CXXXVI, 2007, p. 157-188.
- Morvan, Frederic (2009). La Chevalerie bretonne et la formation de l'armee ducale, 1260-1341 (in French). Presses Universitaires de Rennes.
