= Jauseme, quel vos est semblant =

Start of Jauseme in chansonnier N

Jauseme, quel vos est semblant is a bilingual Old French–Old Occitan partimen (debate poem) on whether it is better to make love right after meeting one's lover or just before departing. The question is posed in French by the "count of Brittany" (coms de Bretagna) to a certain troubadour named Gaucelm. The latter, who responds in Occitan, is usually identified with Gaucelm Faidit, but the identity of the count has been a matter of debate. The most likely candidate is Count Geoffrey II of Brittany (r. 1181–1186). Other candidates are Peter I (r. 1213–1221) and John I (r. 1221–1286), but they are unlikely to have met Gaucelm Faidit.

Jauseme consists of eight stanzas, the odd-numbered being in French (by the count) and the even-numbered in Occitan (by Gaucelm). The final two stanzas are tornadas in which the debate is turned over to a judge, but, unusually, no judge is named. The poem is found in two troubadour chansonniers, N and a^{1}. Both are primarily collections of Occitan poems and the French text has been occitanized, more heavily in a^{1}. Some editors have attempted to reconstruct a more thoroughly French text for the odd-numbered stanzas. In a^{1}, the poem is introduced with the rubric La tenzo del comte de den gaucelm. It is an early example of the partimen type of tenso.

In Jauseme, Gaucelm takes the position that it is better to make love right away "otherwise a man may be disappointed" by a lover who demures. A man who puts off lovemaking when his lady offers it is a fool who cannot have any great desire for her: "once his lady offers him love's joy he ought not to keep her waiting". And "after the love-making, kisses and sweet smiles are all the better." Gaucelm can be said to show "high time preference". The count argues, on the other hand, that deferring will result in the "greater reward" since the memory will be fresher later. They differ also on the question of propriety. Gaucelm considers it better to be frank about one's desires and not to leave quickly after getting what one wants. The count considers it more proper to demonstrate affection first, by "kiss[ing] his lady's face and eyes and mouth and chin".

Jauseme has been translated into English by Ruth Harvey and Linda Paterson.

== Bibliography ==
- Harvey, Ruth; Paterson, Linda M. (2010). The Troubadour Tensos and Partimens: A Critical Edition. Boydell & Brewer.
- Matheis, Eric (2014). Capital, Value, and Exchange in the Old Occitan and Old French Tenson (Including the Partimen and the Jeu-Parti) (PhD dissertation). Columbia University.
