= Constance of Brittany =

Duchess of Brittany from 1166 to 1201

Constance

Duchess of Brittany
- Reign: c. 1166 – 5 September 1201
- Predecessor: Conan IV
- Successor: Arthur I
- Co-rulers: Geoffrey II (1181–1186); Arthur I (1196–1201); Guy (1199–1201)
- Born: c. 1161; Duchy of Brittany
- Died: 5 September 1201 (aged 39–40); Nantes, Brittany
- Burial: Villeneuve Abbey, Nantes
- Spouses: Geoffrey of England (m. 1181; died 1186) Ranulph de Blondeville, 6th Earl of Chester (m. 1188; ann. 1198) Guy of Thouars (m. 1199)
- Issue more...: Eleanor, Fair Maid of Brittany; Arthur I, Duke of Brittany; Alix, Duchess of Brittany; Catherine, Baroness of Vitré
- House: Penthièvre
- Father: Conan IV, Duke of Brittany
- Mother: Margaret of Huntingdon

Constance (Breton: Konstanza; c. 1161 – c. 5 September 1201) was Duchess of Brittany from 1166 to her death in 1201 and Countess of Richmond from 1171 to 1201. (Note: Although she inherited the Earldom of Richmond from her father in 1171, Constance did not enter her inheritance until 1183/1184 (see Judith Everard and Michael Jones, The Charters of Duchess Constance and Her Family (1171–1221), The Boydell Press, 1999, p 38)) Constance was the daughter of Duke Conan IV by his wife, Margaret of Huntingdon, a sister of the Scottish kings Malcolm IV and William I. Her first husband was Geoffrey, fourth son of King Henry II of England.

== Life and reign ==
Banner of Constance of Penthièvre

Constance's father Conan IV had reunited the Duchy of Brittany in wars with Henry II of England. After the wars with Henry II, Conan IV faced rebellions from some Breton nobles. He appealed to Henry II for assistance in putting down those rebellions.

In 1166, Henry invaded Brittany in order to punish the local barons' revolt. In order to gain complete control over the duchy, he forced Conan IV into abdicating in Constance's favor and betrothing her to his fourth legitimate son Geoffrey. Five-year-old Constance succeeded him as Duchess of Brittany. She spent her youth at the English court.

In February 1171, Conan IV died. Although his daughter Constance was the heiress of the Earldom of Richmond, she did not enter her inheritance until 1183/1184.

In 1181, twenty-year-old Constance married Geoffrey. On 19 August 1186 Geoffrey was trampled to death in a riding accident during a tournament in Paris. Constance thereafter became the effective ruler of Brittany.

However, on 3 February 1188, Henry II of England arranged for Constance to marry Ranulf de Blondeville, 6th Earl of Chester, one of the most powerful earls in England. Though Ranulf inconsistently called himself duke of Brittany, he never had the control of the duchy and is not known to have played an important role there. Constance and the Bretons never acknowledged him as duke and excluded him from the government of the duchy.

After King Richard I ascended the English throne, he strengthened his intervention in Brittany. Maintaining custody of Geoffrey's and Constance's daughter, Eleanor, might have been a condition for him to allow Constance to continue ruling. In 1190, Constance appeared at Richard's court at Tours.

In 1191, Richard officially proclaimed his nephew, Constance's son, Arthur, as his heir in a treaty signed with Philip II of France.

To promote her son Arthur's position and inheritance, Constance included him in the government of the duchy in 1196. In response to this act that thwarted his projects, Richard summoned her to Bayeux and had her abducted by Ranulf in Pontorson and imprisoned in Saint-James de Beuvron. He spread the rumour that Constance had been imprisoned for matrimonial reasons. As a result, rebellions were sparked across Brittany on her behalf and Arthur was sent to Brest. Richard demanded that hostages were delivered to him in exchange for Constance's freedom. The Bretons agreed but Constance and the hostages remained imprisoned and rebellions went on. Richard eventually bowed to growing pressure and had the Duchess released in 1198. Back in Brittany, Constance had her marriage annulled.

On 1 June 1199, Pope Innocent III eventually decided that the Archbishopric of Dol should be subordinated to the Metropolitan of Tours and deprived the archbishop of his title and pallium. The archbishopric then became a bishopric again. Constance disagreed with this decision, which gave an advantage to Philip Augustus over Brittany, and was consequently excommunicated.

Constance took Guy of Thouars as her next husband in September or October 1199. (Note: Judith Everard, Michael Jones, The Charters of Duchess Constance of Brittany and her Family (1171–1221), The Boydell Press, 1999, p 135: "The first occasion on which the names of Constance and Guy are linked is at Angiers in October 1199. (...) cf. also the date of Gu2 [a grant for the monks of Buzay], which records that on 27 August 1201, Guy was still only in his second regnal year.")

Between 1198 and the time of her death due to complications from delivering twin daughters, Constance ruled with her son Arthur as co-ruler. Throughout these years, Constance advised her son towards a French alliance, pursuing the policy of her late husband Geoffrey II. (Note: When Richard I died in 1199, Phillip II agreed to recognize Arthur as count of Anjou, Maine, and Poitou, in exchange for Arthur swearing fealty to Phillip II, becoming a direct vassal of France. However after Constance's death, 13-year-old Arthur was captured while besieging Mirebeau, and the following year he was transferred to Rouen, under the charge of William de Braose, and then vanished mysteriously in April 1203 after a period of imprisonment under John I. He was succeeded by his infant half-sister, Alix of Thouars. Guy served as regent of Brittany for Alix from 1203 to 1206. During the conflicts with John I, Constance's eldest daughter Eleanor was captured and imprisoned at Corfe Castle in Dorset and later elsewhere until her death.)

At her request Eleanor was released from royal custody and united with her and Arthur in France.

== Family ==
As a girl, Constance could not inherit the duchy at her father's death if she had a brother. A charter by Margaret, Constance's mother, seems to show that she and Conan had more than one child. (Note: Margaret of Huntingdon made a donation for the souls of "herself, Duke Conan IV, and 'our boys', or 'our children' (pro salute anime... puerorum... nostrorum). This would seem to be a reference to at least one son of the marriage who did not survive infancy, leaving Constance as heiress in 1166." (Everard and Jones, The Charters of Duchess Constance and Her Family (1171–1221), The Boydell Press, 1999, p 94).) However, two charters made by Constance and her son Arthur towards 1200 mention a brother of Constance, William "clericus". As a boy, William should logically have inherited the duchy after Conan, as the Duchy of Brittany followed male-preference primogeniture at the time. According to Everard, Henry II's forcing Constance's father into abdicating in 1166 was meant to prevent any son of the Duke from inheriting the duchy. (Note: According to Everard, the fact that Constance’s brother was called William seems to indicate that he was not an illegitimate son of Conan IV, as William was the name of one of Margaret of Huntingdon’s brothers. (Everard, Judith (2000). Brittany and the Angevins: Province and Empire, 1158-1203. Cambridge University Press, 2000, p 43).) Henry also probably used the precedent created by Conan III himself when he disinherited his son Hoël in favour of his daughter Bertha to impose Constance's succession.

Constance and Geoffrey had three children:

- Eleanor, Fair Maid of Brittany (1182/1184–1241)
- Matilda (c. 1185 – bef. 1189) (Note: Dom Lobineau mentions her existence in his Histoire de Bretagne)
- Arthur I, Duke of Brittany (1187–1203) - Geoffrey's posthumous son

Constance and Guy had two daughters:

- Alix of Thouars (1200–1221); she married Peter Mauclerc, the first Breton ruler of the House of Dreux; and
- Catherine of Thouars (1201 – c. 1240), Dame of Vitre; she married Andrew III, Baron of Vitré, son of Andrew II, Baron of Vitré and Eustacie of Rays; her husband was noteworthy for rebuilding the Château de Vitré (Note: Andrew III and his children Philippa and Andrew IV were the last members of their family to be Baron(ess)of Vitré, which came into the hands of the Counts of Laval through Philippa's marriage to Guy VII of Laval.)

Several sources indicate that Constance might have had a third daughter by Guy:

- Margaret of Thouars (Note: According to historians Dom Morice, Dom Charles Taillandiers, Prudence-Guillaume de Roujoux and Arthur Le Moyne de La Borderie, Constance and Guy had a third daughter, called Margaret.) (Note: Historians Pierre Daru and François Manet state that Constance and Guy had three daughters, but do not specify their names.) (1201 – 1216/1220); she was the first wife of Geoffrey, Viscount of Rohan

== Death and Burial ==
Constance died, age 40, on 5 September 1201 at Nantes. She was buried at Villeneuve Abbey near Nantes, which she had founded earlier that year.

Constance's cause of death is debated. The Chronique de Tours indicated that she died of leprosy but this statement is doubtful. (Note: In the Middle Ages, leprosy was considered a divine punishment for sins of a sexual nature. According to Eric Borgnis Desbordes, the monks of Tours may have considered Constance's third marriage invalid, or they did not forgive the duchess for not having recognized the supremacy of the Archbishopric of Tours over the Bishopric of Dol.) It is also believed that she died from complications of childbirth, shortly after delivering twin daughters. (Note: That Constance was having twins, at the age of forty, in the unsanitary conditions of the age, should be taken greatly into account in this debate. As the exact date of the twins' birth is not currently known, and may never be known, there may never be a resolution to this question.)

== Portrayals ==
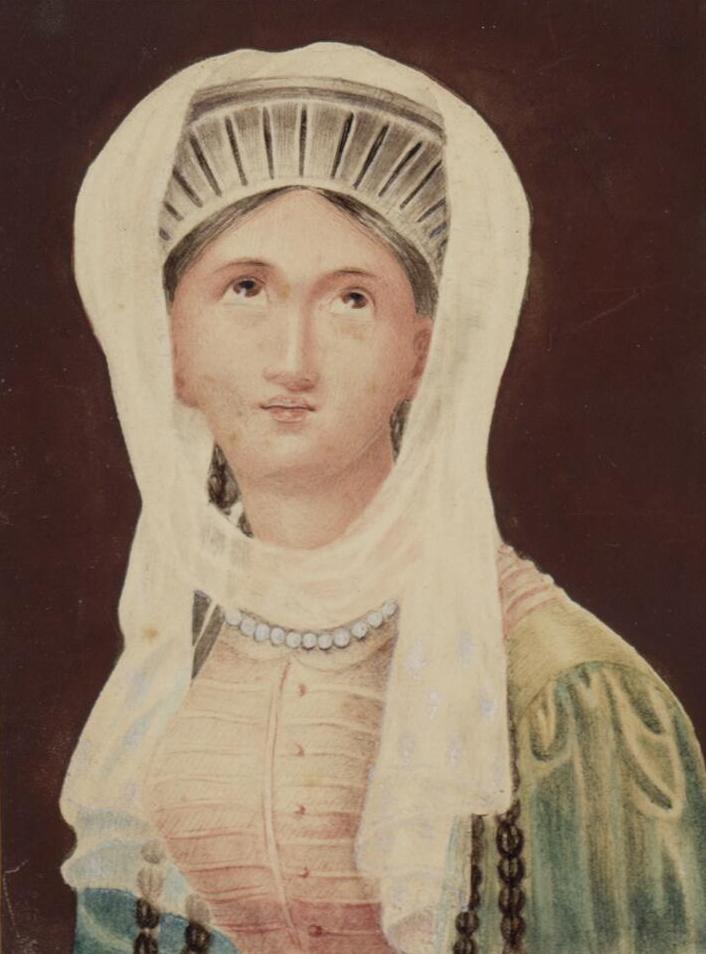
Mrs Siddons as Constance in King John

=== In literature ===
Constance of Brittany appears in several literary works, including:

- The Troublesome Reign of King John (c.1589) anonymous tragedy
- King John (1593–1596) tragedy by William Shakespeare
- Jean sans Terre ou la mort d’Arthur (1791) by Jean-François Ducis
- King John (1800) by Richard Valpy
- La Mort d’Arthur de Bretagne (1826) poem by Alexis Fossé
- Prince of Darkness (2005), Devil's Brood (2008), Lionheart (2011) and A King's Ransom (2014) novels by Sharon Kay Penman

Constance is also mentioned in the poem Le petit Arthur de Bretagne à la tour de Rouen (1822) by Marceline Desbordes-Valmore, the drama Arthur de Bretagne (1885) by Louis Tiercelin and the novels Le Loup blanc (1843) by Paul Féval, Le Poids d’une couronne (légende bretonne) (1867–1868) by Gabrielle d’Étampes, the second volume of the trilogy Le Château des Poulfenc (2009) by Brigitte Coppin and, along with her daughters Matilda, Alix and Catherine and her third husband Guy of Thouars in the novel Dans l’Ombre du Passé (2020) by Léa Chaillou.

=== In theatre and television ===
Constance is a character in the play King John by William Shakespeare, in which she has several very eloquent speeches on grief and death. On screen, she has been portrayed by Julia Neilson in the silent short King John (1899), which recreates John's death scene at the end of the play, Sonia Dresdel in the BBC Sunday Night Theatre version (1952), and Claire Bloom in the BBC Shakespeare version (1984). In the ITC series The Adventures of Robin Hood, she appeared in five episodes variously played by Dorothy Alison (series 1 and 2), Pamela Alan (series 3) and Patricia Marmont (series 4). She was also played by Paula Williams (as a girl) and Nina Francis (as an adult) in the BBC TV drama series The Devil's Crown (1978).

== See also ==
- Dukes of Brittany family tree

== Notes ==
Constance of Brittany House of Penthièvre Born: 1161 1201
Regnal titles
Preceded by Conan IV	Duchess of Brittany; Countess of Rennes; 1166–1201 with Geoffrey II (1181–1186); Arthur I (1196–1201); Guy (1199–1201)	Succeeded by Arthur I
Preceded by Henry	Countess of Nantes; 1185–1201 with Geoffrey II (1185–1186); Arthur I (1196–1201)	Succeeded by Arthur I
Peerage of England
Preceded by Conan IV	Countess of Richmond; 1171–1201 with Geoffrey II (1181–1186); Arthur I (1196–1201); Guy (1199–1201)	Succeeded by Arthur I
