= Guy of Thouars =

Duke of Brittany from 1199 to 1201

Duke of Brittany
- Reign: 1199–1201
- Predecessors: Constance and Arthur I
- Successor: Arthur I
- Co-rulers: Constance and Arthur I

Regent of Brittany
- Regency: 1203–1206
- Monarch: Alix
- Died: 13 April 1213; Chemillé
- Spouses: Constance, Duchess of Brittany (m. 1199; died 1201) Eustachie of Chemillé (m. 1203)
- Issue: Alix, Duchess of Brittany; Catherine, Baroness of Vitré; Margaret of Thouars; Peter, Lord of Chemillé; Thomas of Chémillé
- House: Thouars
- Father: Geoffroy IV of Thouars
- Mother: Aénor de Lusignan

Arms of the Viscounts of Thouars

Guy of Thouars (died 13 April 1213) was Duke of Brittany from 1199 to 1201 as the third husband of Constance, Duchess of Brittany. They married in Angers, County of Anjou, between August and October 1199 (Note: The first act mentioning Constance and Guy dates back to October 1199 and on 27 August 1201, Guy "was still in his second regnal year" (Everard & Jones. The Charters of Duchess Constance of Brittany and Her Family, 1171-1221, 1999, p 135.) after her son Arthur entered Angers to be recognized as count of the three countships of Anjou, Maine and Touraine. He was an Occitan noble, a member of the House of Thouars.

Between 1196 and the time of her death in 1201, while delivering twin daughters, Constance ruled Brittany with her young son, Arthur I, as co-ruler. Duke Arthur was captured in 1202 by his uncle John, King of England, and disappeared in 1203. Arthur's elder full sister Eleanor, was captured along with him and imprisoned by John. Arthur was succeeded by his infant half-sister, Guy's daughter Alix of Thouars. Guy served as regent of Brittany for his daughter from 1203 to 1206.

In 1204, Guy as regent of Duchess Alix, vassal of Philip II of France, undertook the siege of the Norman island fortress of Mont Saint-Michel. Because the abbey would not surrender, he set fire to the village and massacred the population. (Note: Stephen Church states Guy of Thouars, destroyed Mont Saint-Michel by fire.) The fire which he himself lit extended to the buildings, and the roofs were engulfed in flames. Philip II paid Abbot Jordan for the reconstruction cost.

In 1206 Philip II took the regency of Brittany himself, much to the consternation of the Breton nobles. (Note: The young Arthur had already sworn fealty to Philip as king in 1199; Philip now chose this opportunity to exert direct influence in Brittany. In 1213 Philip II of France arranged for Alix of Thouars to marry Peter of Dreux.)

Guy died in 1213 in Chemillé in the county of Maine, and was buried with Constance at Villeneuve Abbey, now in the commune of Les Sorinières, outside of Nantes. 'Situated at Nantes south gate, Abbey de Villeneuve' was 'founded in 1201 by Constance de Panthièvre, the Duchess of Brittany ...'

== Issue ==
Guy married Constance of Brittany in 1199. They had two or three daughters:

- Alix of Thouars, succeeded her half-brother in 1203 as suo jure Duchess of Brittany and Countess of Richmond;
- Catherine of Thouars, Dame of Aubigné; married Andrew III, Baron of Vitré in 1212;
- Margaret of Thouars. (Note: According to historians Dom Morice, Dom Charles Taillandiers, Prudence-Guillaume de Roujoux and Arthur Le Moyne de La Borderie, Constance and Guy had a third daughter, called Margaret.) (Note: Historians Pierre Daru and François Manet state that Constance and Guy had three daughters, but do not specify their names.)

Guy remarried Eustachie of Chemillé in 1203. They had two sons:

- Peter, Lord of Chemillé (1204-1254/55), who married Eleanor of Porhoët.
- Thomas of Chémillé (d. c. January 1246).

== See also ==
- Dukes of Brittany family tree
- Viscounts of Thouars

== Sources ==
- Church, Stephen (2015). King John: And the Road to Magna Carta. Basic Books.
- Everard, J.A. & Jones, M. Charters of Duchess Constance of Brittany and her Family, The Boydell Press, 1999
- Everard, J.A. Brittany and the Angevins, Cambridge University Press, 2000
