= The Devil's Crown =

- Also known as: La Couronne du Diable
- Genre: Drama; History
- Written by: Jack Russell; Ken Taylor
- Directed by: Alan Cooke; Jane Howell; Ronald Wilson
- Starring: Brian Cox; Jane Lapotaire; Michael Byrne; John Duttine; Christopher Gable
- Composer: David Cain
- Countries of origin: United Kingdom; France; Switzerland; Italy
- Original language: English
- No. of series: 1
- No. of episodes: 13

Production
- Producer: Richard Beynon
- Running time: 55 minutes
- Production companies: British Broadcasting Corporation (BBC); Radiotelevisione Italiana; TF1; Time-Life Television Productions; Télécip; Télévision Suisse-Romande (TSR)

Original release
- Network: BBC2
- Release: 30 April – 1 July 1978

The Devil's Crown is a BBC television series that dramatised the reigns of three medieval Kings of England: Henry II and his sons Richard I and John. It is also known as La couronne du Diable in French.

The series was written by Jack Russell and Ken Taylor. It was shown in the United Kingdom in thirteen 55-minute episodes between 30 April and 23 July 1978.

Despite being well-regarded overall, it is nowadays considered to be a lost series since it is not easily accessible to view. A full set of tape copies exist at the British Film Institute, where they can be viewed on request. It has never been released on DVD and is not free to view on any official streaming platforms. The only way to legally view the show is a French dubbed version, called La couronne du Diable, which is available as a paid download.

== Summary ==
Henry Plantagenet (latterly Henry II), sees his opportunity to seize the crown of England and create a kingdom of law and order. He cuts a deal with cousin King Stephen in which Stephen will name him his heir, excluding his sons Eustace and William in exchange for a fragile truce. Stephen's sudden death elevates Henry to the throne. He may have been King of England, but the bulk of the Angevin Empire was in France, and it was this that Henry regarded as the Jewel in his Crown, maintained through a series of political marriages and complex allegiances. Henry pays homage to Louis VII, King of the Franks, for these lands, but it is clear that Henry is the shrewder and more ambitious of the two kings, having married Louis' ex-wife Eleanor of Aquitaine. As the years go on, Henry's numerous political achievements come under threat by familial strife as well as the ascension of Louis's much more canny and competent son Philip II to the French throne. After he dies during a rebellion by Eleanor and his three surviving sons, he is succeeded by his second son Richard who is more interested in crusading than governing. When Richard dies childless, there is a succession battle between his underage nephew Arthur and loathsome brother John in which John comes out on top. John is forced into signing Magna Carta by his barons but soon dies, leaving the vestiges of a once great empire to his young son Henry III.

== Cast ==
- Brian Cox as Henry II of England
- Michael Byrne as Richard I of England
  - Glen Barlow as younger Richard
  - Adrian Clark as young Richard
  - Paul Rose as thirteen-year-old Richard
  - Lawrence Clark as seven-year-old Richard
- John Duttine as John, King of England
  - Paul Spurrier as young John
- Jane Lapotaire as Eleanor of Aquitaine
- Christopher Gable as Philip II of France
- Ralph Arliss as Geoffrey, Archbishop of York
- Charles Kay as Louis VII of France
- Jack Shepherd as Thomas Becket
- Kevin McNally as Henry the Young King
  - Dominic Savage as young Henry
- Martin Neil as Geoffrey II, Duke of Brittany
  - Austin Somervell as young Geoffrey
- Zoë Wanamaker as Berengaria of Navarre
- Lynsey Baxter as Isabella of Angoulême
- Freddie Jones as Bertran de Born
- Peter Benson as Blondel de Nesle
- Roy Boyd as Ranulf de Glanville
- Lucy Gutteridge as Alys, Countess of the Vexin
  - Lorna Yabsley as thirteen-year-old Alys
- Michael Hawkins as Richard de Luci
- Ian Hogg as William de Braose, 4th Lord of Bramber
- Ralph Michael as Hubert Walter
- Patrick Troughton as William Marshal, 1st Earl of Pembroke
- Nina Francis as Constance, Duchess of Brittany
  - Paula Williams as young Constance
- Simon Gipps-Kent as Arthur I, Duke of Brittany
- Joanne Stevens as Joan of England, Queen of Sicily
- Bob Goody as Guide
- Elizabeth Stewart as Midwife
- Susannah Fellows as Rosamund de Clifford
- Bruce Purchase as Geoffrey Plantagenet, Count of Anjou
- Brenda Bruce as Empress Matilda
- Frederick Treves as Stephen, King of England
- Paul Greenwood as Geoffrey, Count of Nantes
- Thorley Walters as Gilbert Foliot
- Norman Etlinger as the Archbishop of York

== Episode list ==
- Ep.1 - If All the World Were Mine
- Ep.2 - The Earth Is Not Enough
- Ep.3 - A Rose, a Thorn
- Ep.4 - The Hungry Falcons
- Ep.5 - Before the Dark
- Ep.6 - Richard Yea and Nay
- Ep.7 - Lion of Christendom
- Ep.8 - When Cage-Birds Sing
- Ep.9 - Bolt from the Blue
- Ep.10 - In Sun's Eclipse
- Ep.11 - The Flowers Are Silent
- Ep.12 - Tainted King
- Ep.13 - To the Devil They Go

== See also ==
- List of historical drama films
