= Guy VII de Laval =

Guy VII of Montmorency-Laval (1219–1267), baron of Vitré, lord of Laval (1264–1267), lord of Acquigny, Aubigné and Olivet. He and his father-in-law, Andrew III, Baron of Vitré, went on crusade and following the death of his father-in-law, he inherited the barony of Vitré, the viscounty of Rennes, and the lands of Marcillé and Aubigné, through his wife Philippa de Vitré. Guy inherited Laval after his mother's death in 1264. He joined the expedition to Italy and died in 1267.

== Life ==
Born in 1219, Guy was the son of Matthew II of Montmorency and Emma of Laval. After his father's death and as the eldest son of Emma of Laval, he took, in accordance with her parents' matrimonial conventions, the name of Guy VII. His mother nevertheless, remained Lady of Laval throughout her life. Guy succeeded his father in an indeterminate part of his lands: an arrangement which he subsequently made in 1247 with his half-brother, Bouchard VI de Montmorency, assured him those of Acquigny in Normandy, of Hérouville, near Pontoise, of Isle Saint-Denys, of Epinolet, Andelys.

After taking the name of Laval, Guy retained the arms of Montmorency, which he loaded with five silver shells on the cross. The name of Montmorency will be taken up in the 18th century by Guy André Pierre de Montmorency-Laval, Marshal of France and Anne Adrien Pierre de Montmorency-Laval, Duke of Laval.

== Crusade ==
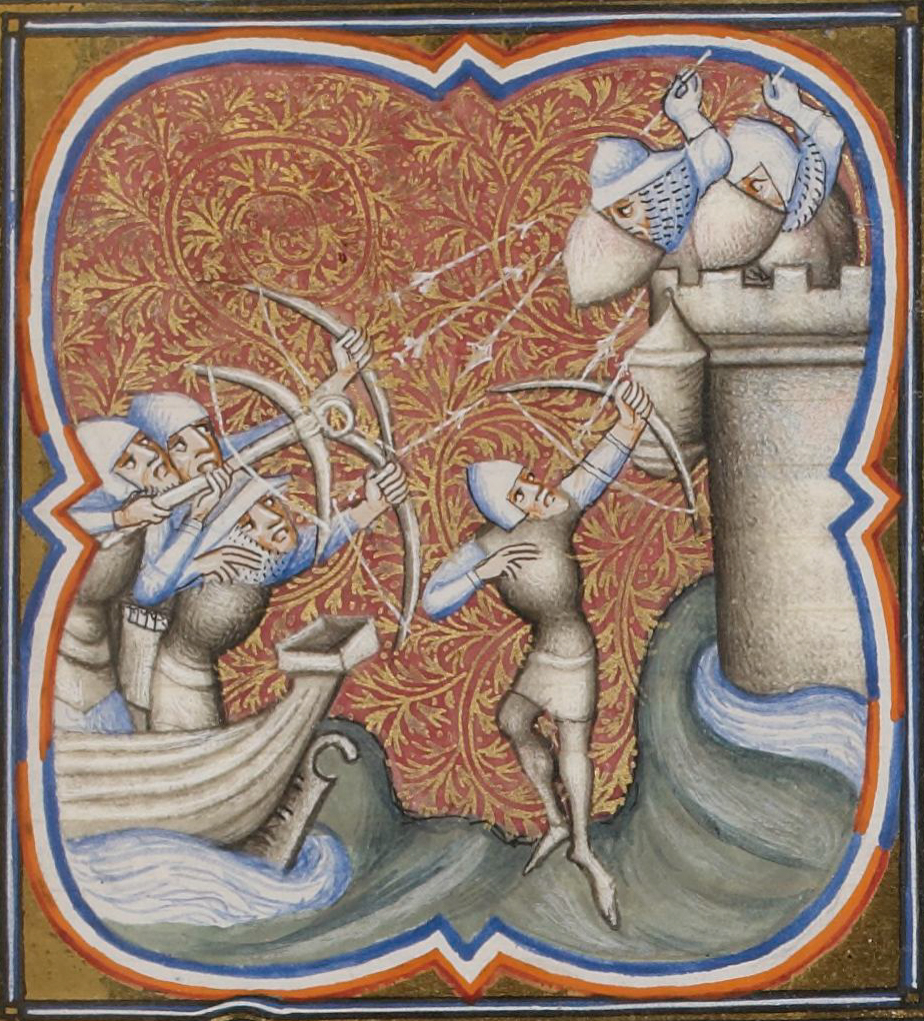
Arrival of the Crusader fleet at Damietta.

Guy left in 1248 for the Seventh Crusade with Andrew III, Baron of Vitré, his father-in-law. He participated in the capture of Damietta in 1249.

=== Succession of Vitré ===
Guy's father-in-law died in 1250, leaving a son, (Note: Philippa's younger brother, Andrew IV (1248–1251), born shortly after their father's departure for the crusade, had, after her father's death at Mansourah, possessed these goods for barely a year, and he himself, at the age of 3 1/2 years, had preceded his sister to the tomb. The Vitré family was extinct: its property was united with the domains of the lords of Laval.) who died the following year leaving no issue. Through this, Guy, in the name of his wife, inherited the barony of Vitré, one of the four large baronies of Brittany, the viscounty of Rennes, attached to this house, as well as the lordships of Aubigné, Marcillé and Châtillon-en-Vendelais. Barely lord of Vitré, Guy had to fulfill a duty concerning the coronation of the bishop of Rennes, which fell to him jointly with the lords of Aubigné, Châteaugiron and de la Guerche.

== Death ==
Guy succeeded his mother in the land of Laval in 1264. He joined Charles I of Anjou, accompanied by his son, in the expedition into Italy, where he died. He was succeeded by his eldest son, Guy VIII of Laval.

== Marriages and children ==
In 1239, Guy married Philippa de Vitré, the eldest daughter of Andrew III, Baron of Vitré and Catherine of Thouars, sister of the Duchess of Brittany. On 20 August 1253, Guy VII and his wife made the pilgrimage of Rocamadour. On 16 September 1254, his wife died of phthisis. Their children were:

- Emmette, married around 1275 to Prigent de Coëtmen, lord of Landegonnet, viscount of Tonquédec.
- Guy VIII of Laval, lord of Laval, Aubigné and Vitré, married firstly, Isabeau of Beaumont-sur-Oise and secondly, Jeanne of Beaumont, Lady of Loué
- Catherine (born c.1240), lady of Laudauran, married on 5 May 1265 to Harvey IV, Viscount of Léon
- Guyonne (born c.1250), married to Patri de Chourses

The following year, Guy married Thomass de La Guerche, lady of Mareuil, daughter of William de La Guerche, lord of Pouancé, widow of Andrew III, Baron of Vitré. They had:

- Bouchard I (born 20 January 1265), lord of Conflans-Sainte -Honorine, Attichy and La Malmaison.
- Mahé (Mathieu), died young
- Yolande

== Sources ==
- Dahmen, Lynne Marie (2000). The "Roman de Silence" and the narrative traditions of the thirteenth century. Indiana University Press.
- Le Roy, Pierre (1996). La reine Jeanne: Jeanne de Laval, seconde épouse du roi René, 1433-1498. Éditions régional de l'Ouest.
- Morvan, Frédéric (2009). La Chevalerie de Bretagne et la formation de l'armée ducale 1260-1341. Presses Universitaires de Rennes.
- Walsby, Malcolm (2007). The Counts of Laval: Culture, Patronage and Religion in Fifteenth- and Sixteenth-Century France. Ashgate Publishing.
