= Harvey III of Léon =

Harvey III of Léon (c. 1219 – c. 1265) was Viscount of Léon. He succeeded his father Guihomar VI.

== Life ==
Harvey was the son of Guihomar VI, Viscount of Léon and Marie of Penthievre.

To repay his debts to Duke John I, Harvey III sold him the castle and port of Brest in March 1240 in Quimperlé, which allowed the Duke to have a bearing in the north-west of the Duchy. The castellum (castle) of Quimperlé was burnt down in 1241 by one of Harvey III's distant relatives, also named Harvey of Léon, who had rebelled against the Duke.

Harvey III died at an unknown date after May 1265.

== Issue ==
Harvey had married a woman named Margilie. They had four children:

- Harvey IV who succeeded his father
- Alan, who died without issue
- Anné, who married Roland II, Lord of Dinan a knight, Lord of Montafilant and Runefau
- Constance married Guillaume of Plœuc

== Sources ==
- Patrick Kernévez, André-Yves Bourgès Généalogie des vicomtes de Léon (XIe, XIIe et XIIIe siècles). Bulletin de la Société archéologique du Finistère, volume CXXXVI, 2007, p. 157-188.
- Morvan, Frederic (2009). La Chevalerie bretonne et la formation de l'armee ducale, 1260-1341 (in French). Presses Universitaires de Rennes.
