= Château de Vitré =

Medieval castle in Vitré, France

Coordinates: 48°7′28″N 1°12′55″W

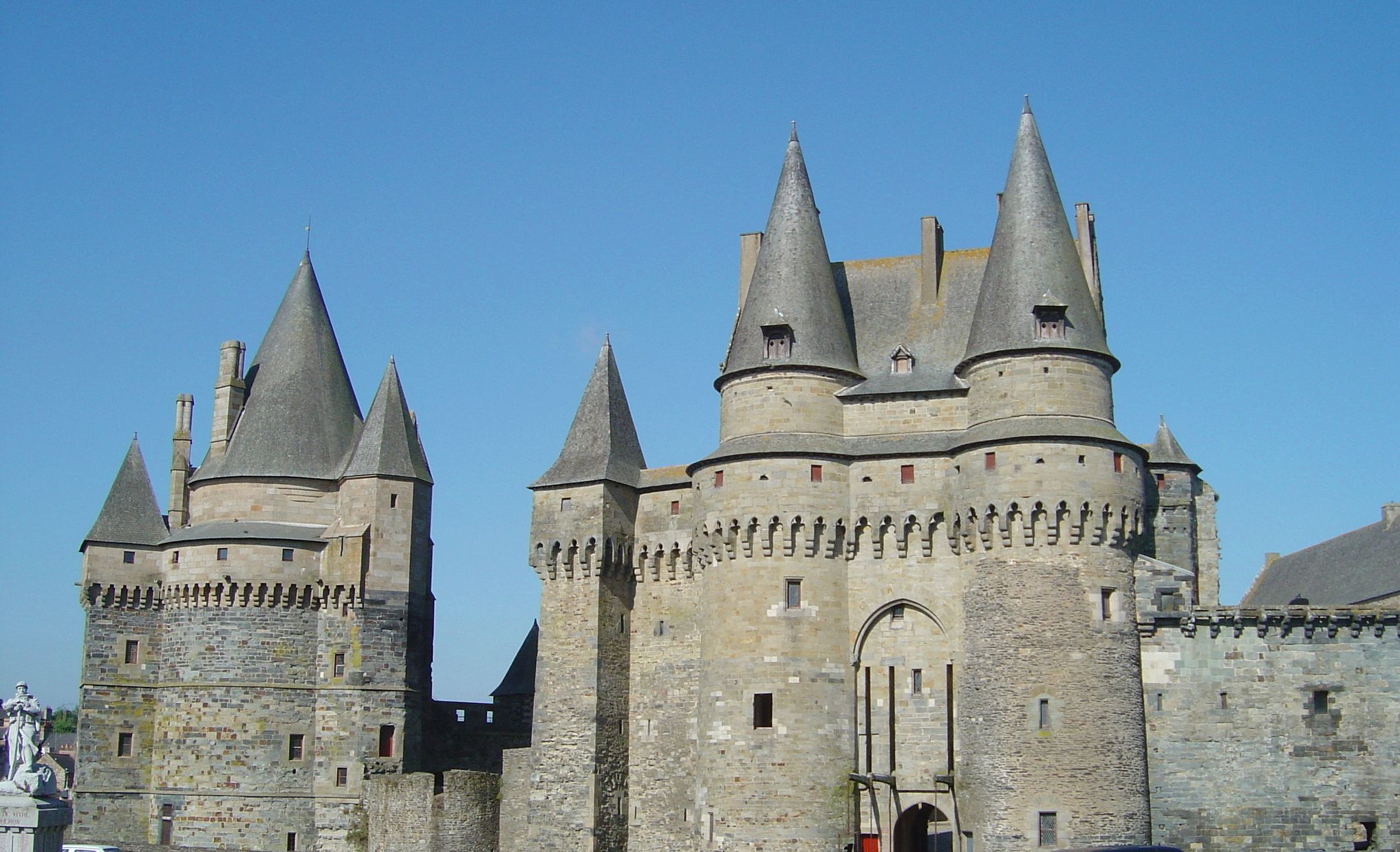
Gatehouse and Saint-Laurent Tower

The Château de Vitré is a medieval castle in the town of Vitré, in the Ille-et-Vilaine département of France.

The first castle in Vitré was built of wood on a feudal motte around the year 1000 on the Sainte-Croix hill. The castle was burned down on several occasions, and eventually was bequeathed to the Benedictine monks of Marmoutier Abbey.

The first stone castle was built by the baron Robert I of Vitré at the end of the 11th century. The defensive site chosen, a rocky promontory, dominated the valley of the Vilaine. A Romanesque style doorway still survives from this building. During the first half of the 13th century, baron André III, rebuilt it in its present triangular form, following the contours of the rocks, surrounded with dry moats.

At his death, the land fell to the family of the Counts of Laval. Guy XII de Laval enlarged the castle in the 15th century. During this period, the final defensive works were realised, notably the gatehouse with double drawbridge, tour Saint-Laurent (St Laurent Tower, the main keep later pierced with cannon apertures) and tour de la Madeleine (Magdalene Tower). Nevertheless, in 1487, Guy XV de Laval opened the castle to French troops without a fight.

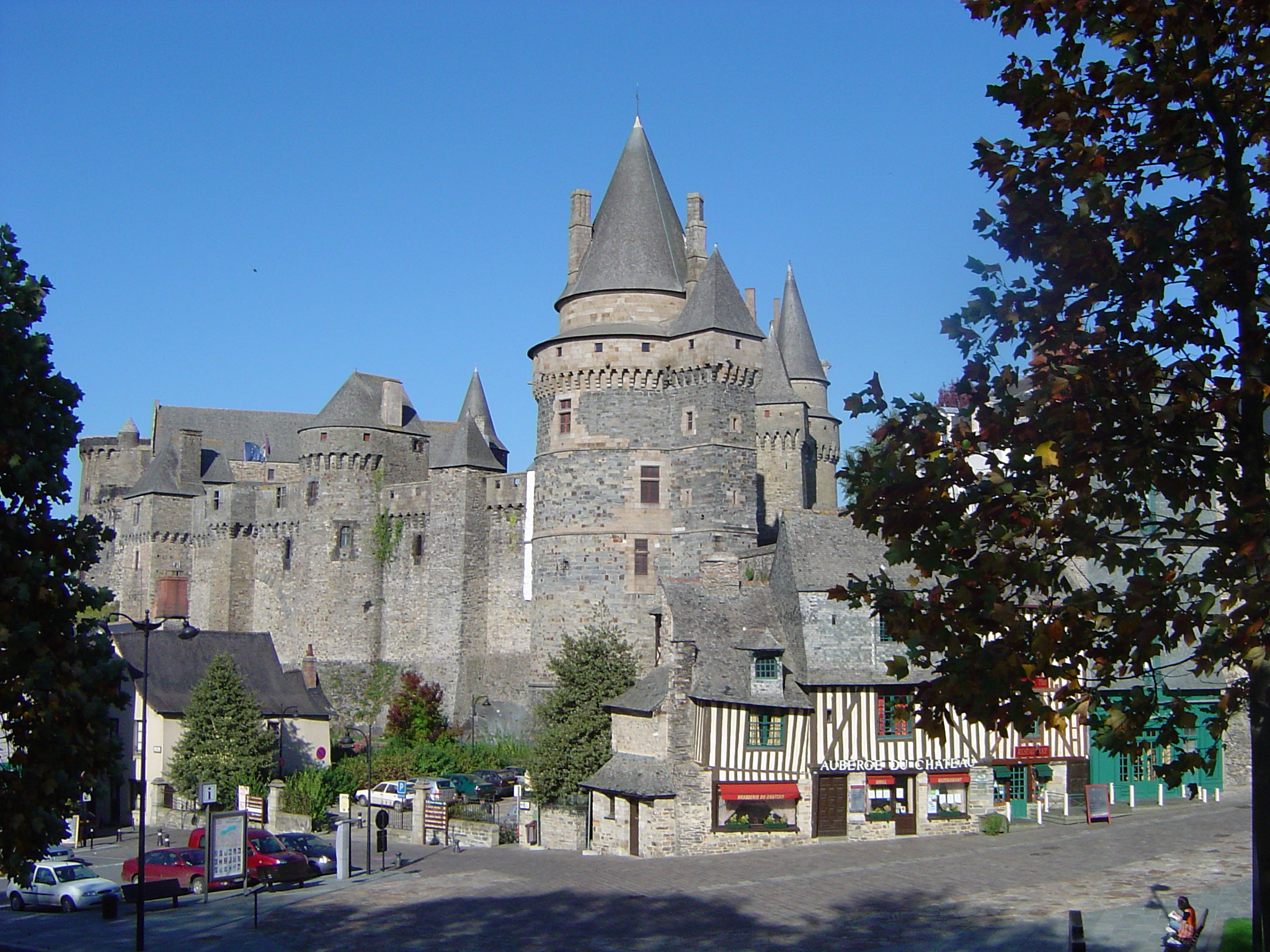
South façade and Place Saint-Yves

From the end of the 15th century, alterations concentrated on improving the comfort of the castle, including the construction of galleries and a renaissance style oratory (1530). The Parlement of Brittany took refuge in the castle three times (in 1564, 1582 and 1583), while plague raged in Rennes.

Under the Rieux and Cologny families, owners of the castle between 1547 and 1605, Vitré sheltered Protestants and became for some years a Huguenot stronghold. In 1589, the castle resisted a five-month siege by Philippe Emmanuel, duc de Mercœur. In 1605, the castle became the property of the Trémoille family, originally from Poitou. The castle was abandoned in the 17th century and began to decline, notably with the partial collapse of the St Laurent Tower and the accidental fire which destroyed the feudal residence at the end of the 18th century.

A départemental prison was built in place of the residence and occupied the northern part of the castle, including the Magdalene Tower. The prison became a barracks with the arrival of the 70th infantry regiment between 1876 and 1877.

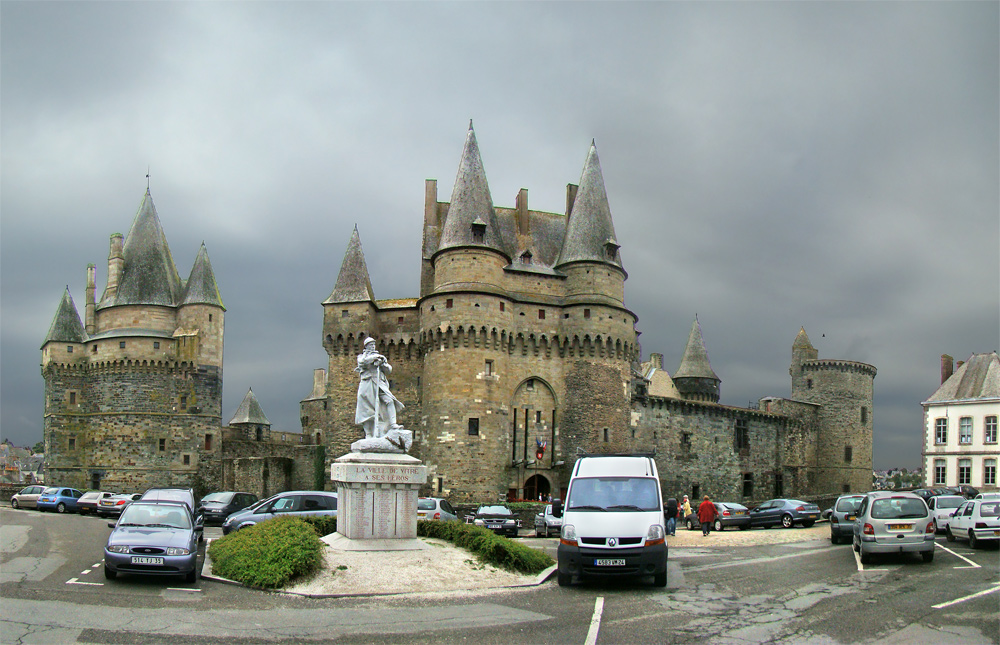
East façade and Place du Château

The castle was bought by the town in the 1820 for 8500 francs. In 1872, it was one of the first castles in France to be classified as a monument historique (historic monument) and restored from 1875 under the direction of the architect Darcy. Placed in the public domain, the castle was furnished with a small museum, in 1876, inspired by Arthur de la Borderie. Paradoxically, he destroyed the collégiale de la Madeleine (collegiate church of the Madeleine) in the castle courtyard while he was in charge of conservation for the town. A boys' school was built in its place.

Today, the Vitré town hall stands inside the curtain wall, in a building reconstructed in 1912 following the plans of the medieval residence. The Place du Château, outside the castle, used to be the castle forecourt where stables and outbuildings were. It is now a car park that will be revamped in 2007 to properly show off one of the most imposing castles in France.

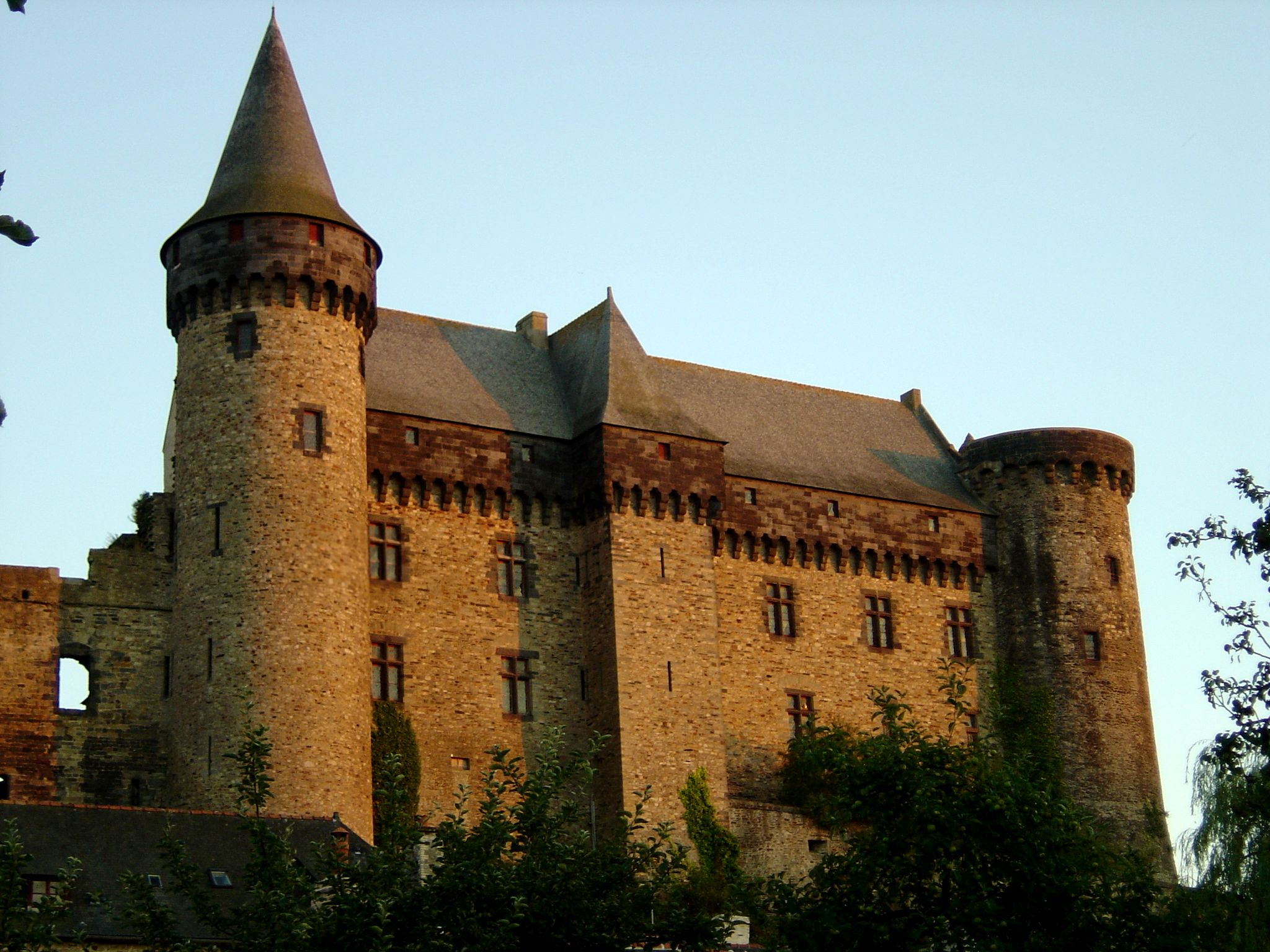
East façade

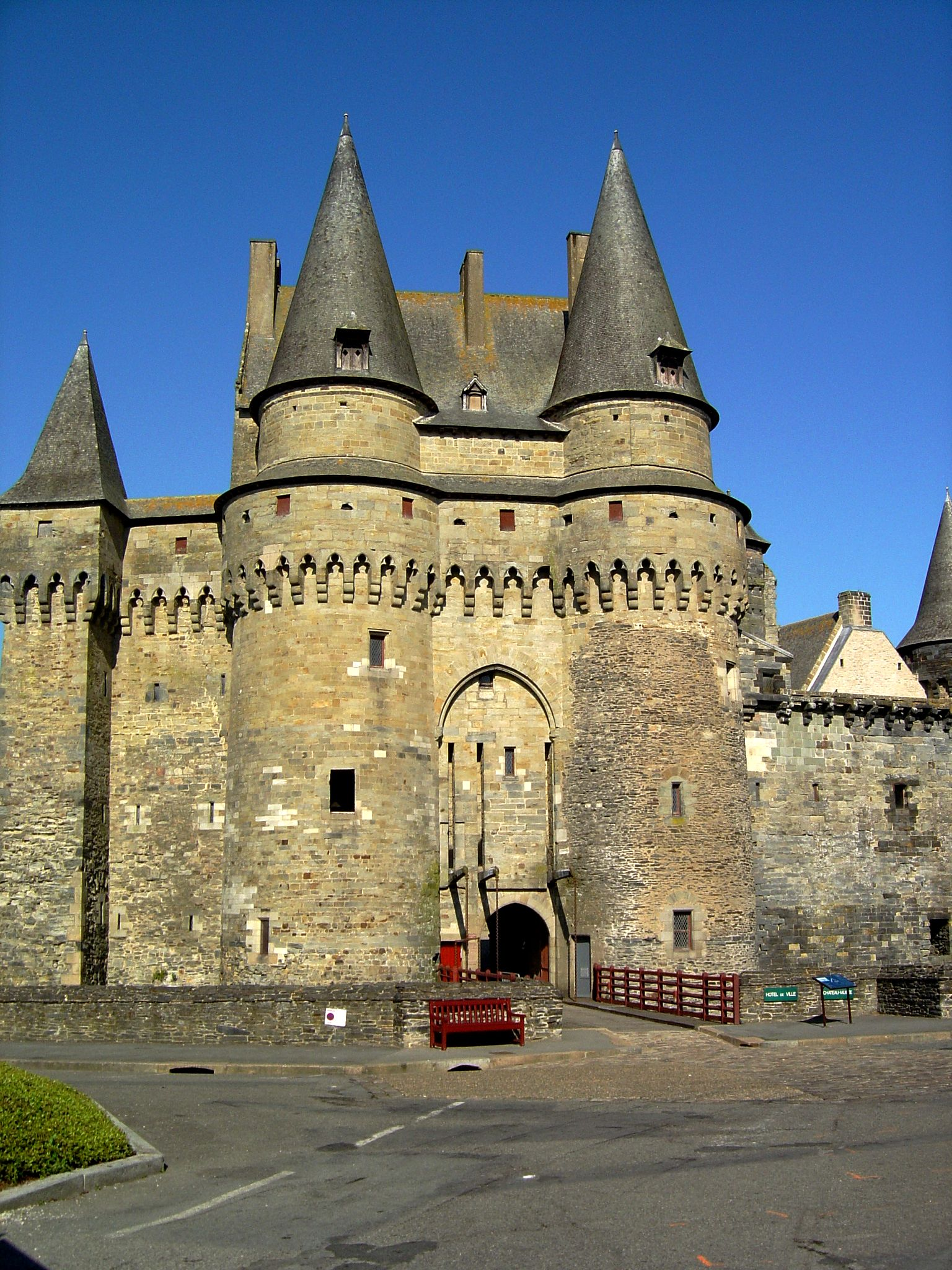
Detail of gatehouse entrance

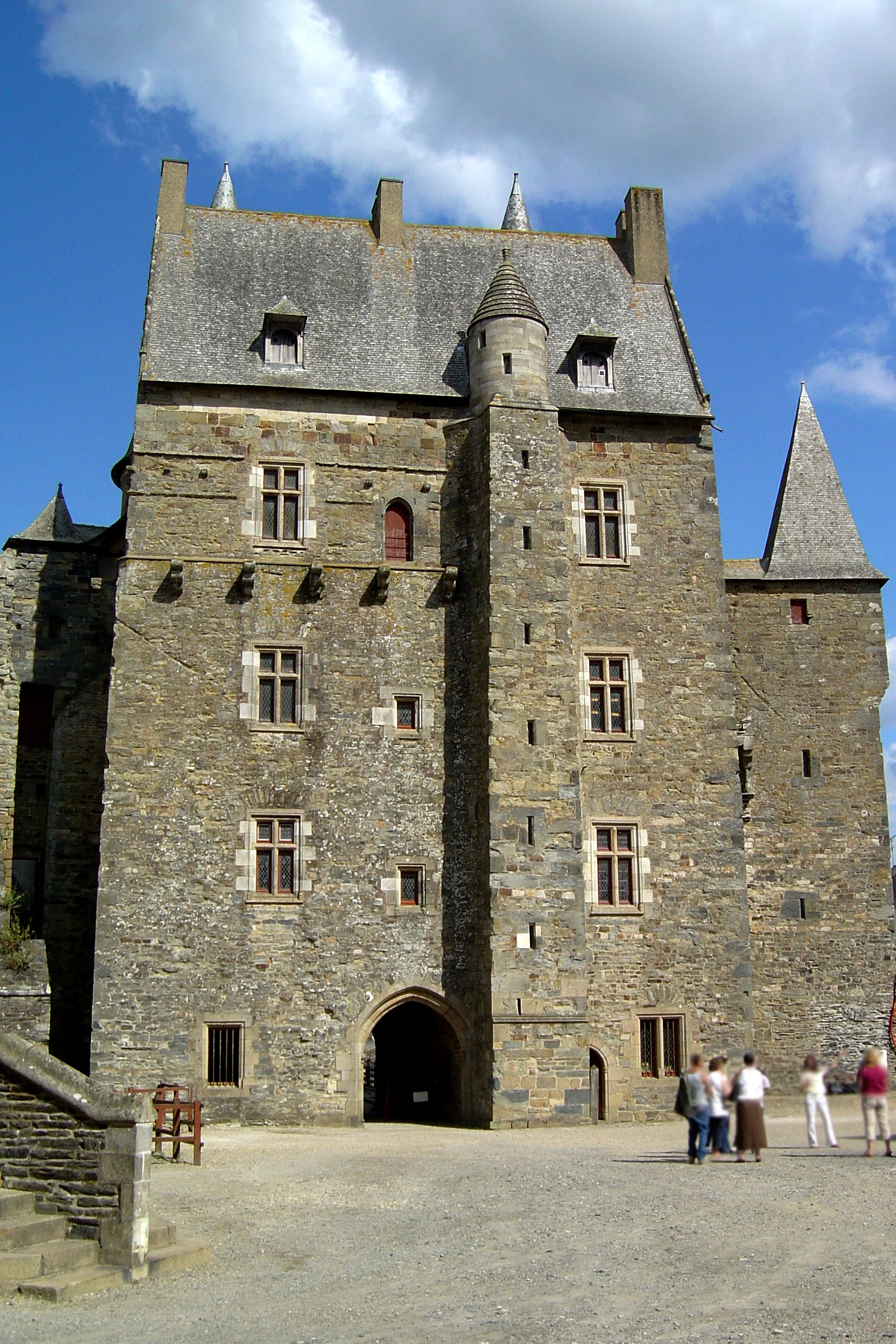
Fortified gatehouse from inside of the courtyard

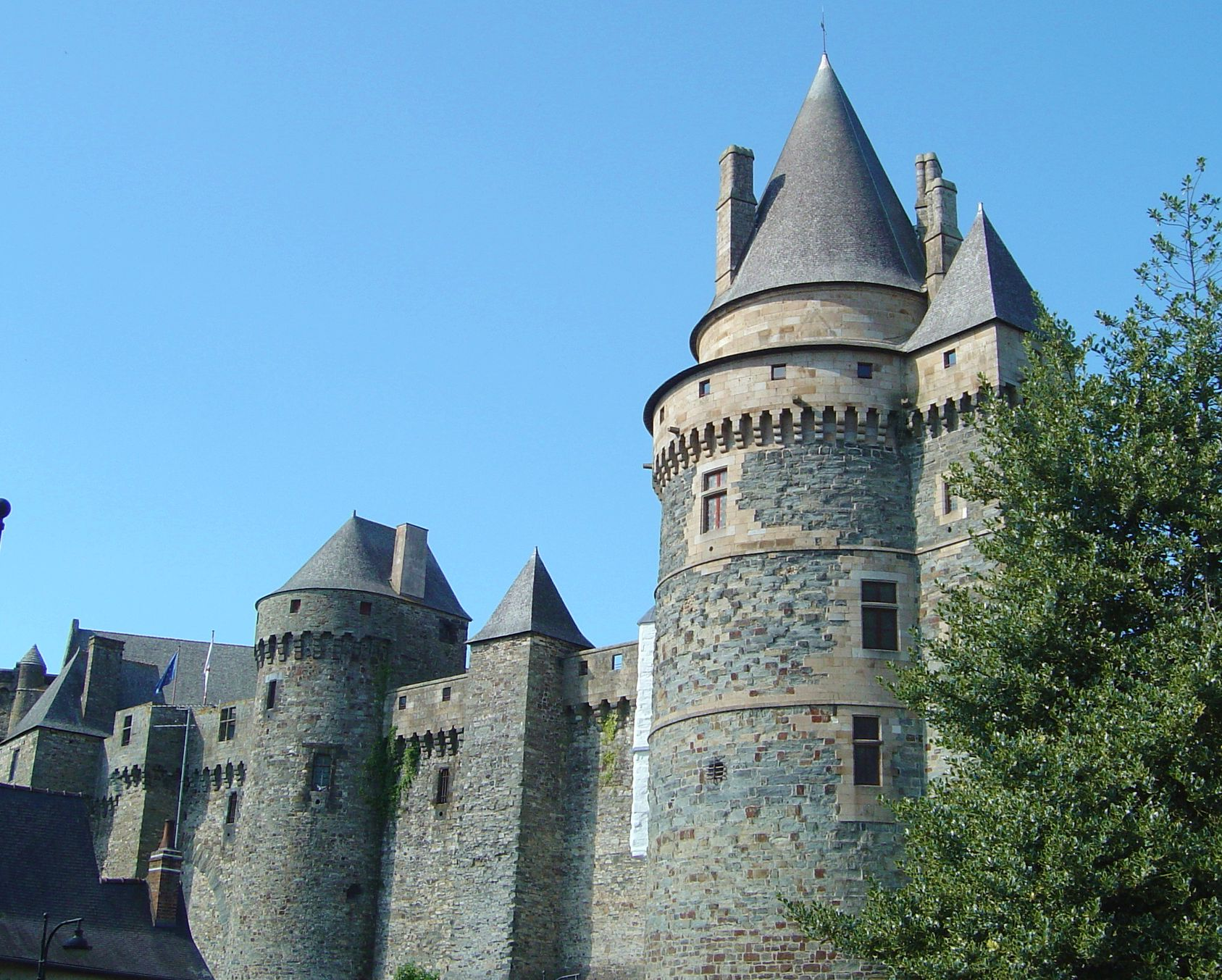
West façade

Click on thumbnail to enlarge

== See also ==
- Vitré, Ille-et-Vilaine
- List of castles in France
- Château des Rochers-Sévigné
