= Alix, Duchess of Brittany =

Duchess of Brittany from 1203 to 1221

Alix
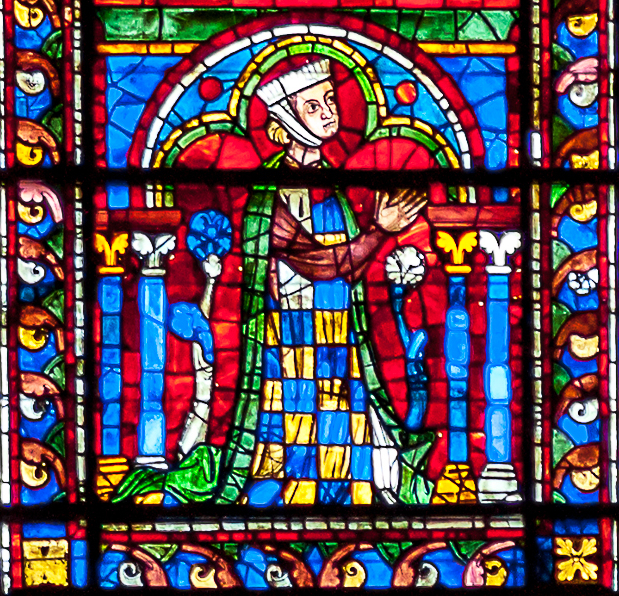
- Alix represented on a window in Chartres Cathedral

Duchess of Brittany
- Reign: April 1203 – 21 October 1221
- Predecessor: Arthur I
- Successor: John I
- Co-ruler: Peter I (1213–1221)
- Regents: Guy of Thouars (1203–1206); Philip II of France (1206–1213)
- Born: 1200; Brittany
- Died: 21 October 1221 (aged 20–21)
- Burial: 24 November 1225; Villeneuve Abbey, Nantes
- Spouse: Peter of Dreux (m. 1213)
- Issue: John I, Duke of Brittany; Yolande, Countess of Penthièvre
- House: Thouars
- Father: Guy of Thouars
- Mother: Constance, Duchess of Brittany

Alix of Thouars (1200 – 21 October 1221), whose name may also be spelled Alis or Alice, was the Duchess of Brittany from 1203 until her death. She was also Countess of Richmond in the peerage of England. (Note: Although Eleanor of Brittany was styled Countess of Richmond as well as titular Duchess of Brittany from 1203 to 1218 by her uncle John, this was only a titular title, as Alix herself was styled Countess of Richmond and even made charters about this estate.)

== Life ==
Alix was born in 1200. She was the daughter of Constance, Duchess of Brittany, and her co-ruler and third husband, Guy of Thouars. According to several French historians, Constance died after giving birth to Alix's sisters Catherine and Margaret. (Note: According to historian Arthur Le Moyne de La Borderie, Constance and Guy had a third daughter, Margaret.) Alix's older half-brother was Arthur I, Duke of Brittany, and her half-sisters were Eleanor and Matilda of Brittany, the children of Constance by Geoffrey of England. Upon the death of Richard I of England, a power struggle commenced between her half-brother Arthur and John, King of England. At the Battle of Mirebeau in 1202, Arthur and Eleanor were captured. Arthur was imprisoned at the Château de Falaise and in 1203 disappeared. Eleanor was imprisoned at Corfe Castle.

The Breton barons recognized Alix as Duchess of Brittany after the presumed death of Arthur, instead of Eleanor. This was due to fears that John might claim to rule Brittany as regent for the imprisoned Eleanor. Alix's father became regent for Alix until 1206, when Philip II of France made himself the regent of the duchy in Alix's name. Philip II broke off the betrothal of Alix and the Breton prince Henry of Penthièvre, (Note: Henry and his family would later become dispossessed of the Countship of Penthièvre by Alix's husband, Peter I, Duke of Brittany, who would then bestow the title on their daughter Yolande of Brittany.) and turned to his French cousin Peter of Dreux, as Alix's husband. In 1208, John permitted Eleanor to style herself Duchess of Brittany and Countess of Richmond, but gave her no lands of Richmond Earldom. Peter married Alix on 27 January 1213, and paid homage to the French king for Brittany. In 1214 John recognized Alix as Duchess of Brittany, renouncing the claim of Eleanor.

In 1218 Peter and Alix were recognised by the English regent William Marshal, 1st Earl of Pembroke, as Earl and Countess of Richmond in place of Eleanor, who would never be released from imprisonment.

Alix died on 21 October 1221, without having exercised much control over her own inheritance. She was succeeded in the duchy by her son John I, but Peter remained the de facto ruler of Brittany as John I's regent until 1237.

== Children ==
Alix and Peter had:

1. John I, Duke of Brittany (c. 1217–1286), married Blanche of Navarre, daughter of the king of Navarre, Theobald I of Navarre.
2. Yolande of Brittany, (1218–1272), married Hugh XI of Lusignan, Count of Angoulême and Count of Marche
3. Arthur of Brittany (1220–1224), betrothed to Jeanne de Craon, daughter of Amaury I de Craon and Jeanne des Roches

== Portrayals in literature ==
Alix of Thouars is the heroine of the novel Le Poids d’une couronne (légende bretonne) (1867–1868) by Gabrielle d’Étampes and is mentioned in the novel Dans l’Ombre du Passé (2020) by Léa Chaillou, where it is revealed that the heroine is named after her.

== Sources ==
- Baldwin, John W. (1986). The Government of Philip Augustus: Foundations of French Royal Power in the Middle Ages. University of California Press.
- Everard, Judith; Jones, Michael, eds. (1999). The Charters of Duchess Constance of Brittany and her Family (1171-1221. The Boydell Press.
- Morvan, Frederic (2009). La Chevalerie bretonne et la formation de l'armee ducale (in French). Presses Universitaires de Rennes.
- Painter, Sidney (2020). The Scourge of the Clergy: Peter of Dreux, Duke of Brittany. Johns Hopkins University Press.28
- Richard, Jean (1983). Lloyd, Simon (ed.). Saint Louis: Crusader King of France. Translated by Birrell, Jean. Cambridge University Press.
- Smith, Julia M.H. (1995). "Brittany". In Kibler, William W. (ed.). Medieval France: An Encyclopedia. Garland Publishing Inc.

== See also ==
- Dukes of Brittany family tree

Alix, Duchess of Brittany House of Thouars
Regnal titles
Preceded by Arthur I	Duchess of Brittany; 1203–1221 with Peter (1213-1221)	Succeeded by John I
Peerage of England
Preceded by Arthur I	Countess of Richmond; 1203–1221 with Peter (1213–1221)	Succeeded by John I
