= Aubigné, Ille-et-Vilaine =

Aubigné Aubeinyae (Gallo) Elvinieg (Breton)
- Commune
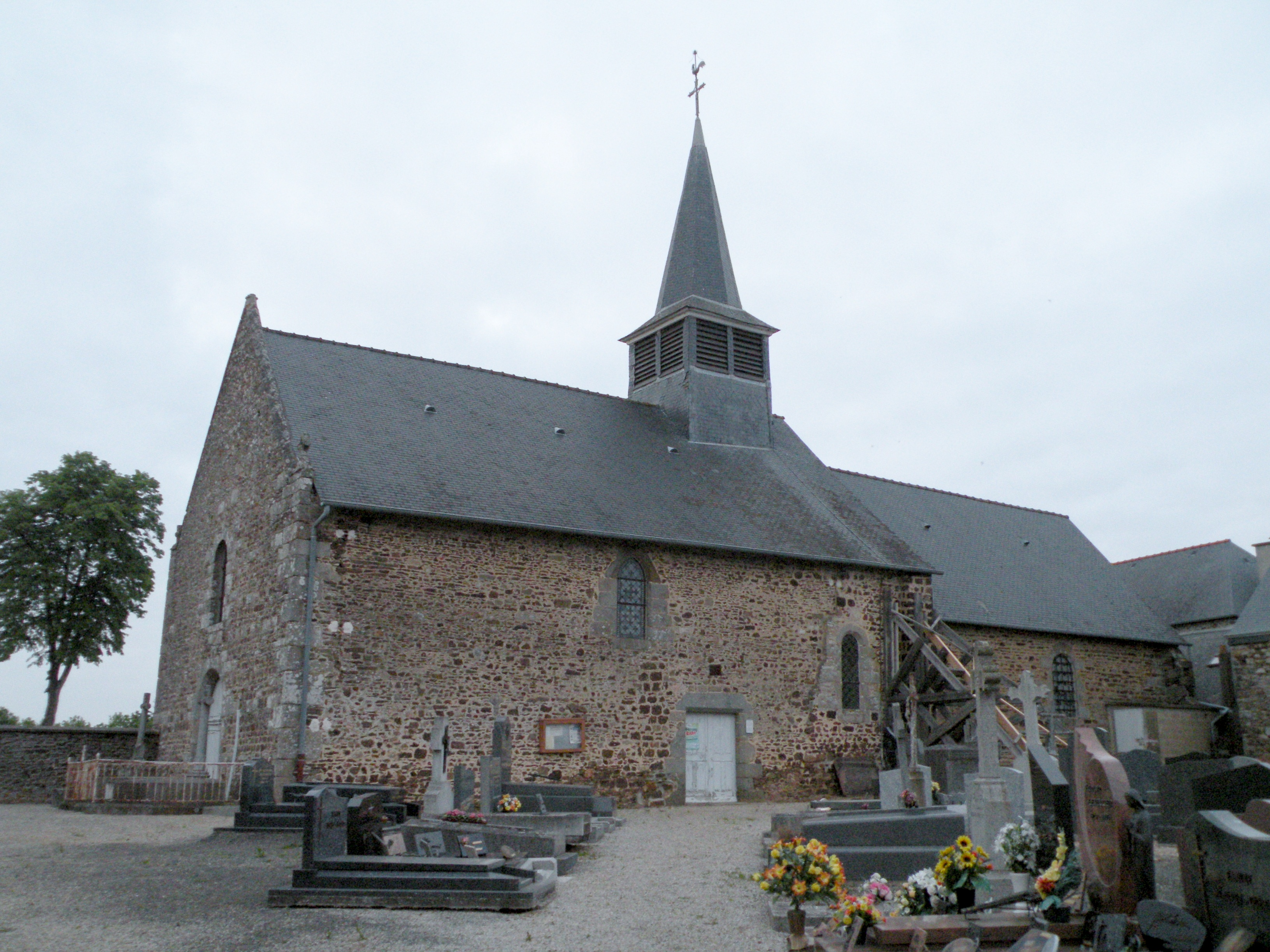
- Église Notre-Dame in Aubigné

- Coat of arms
- Location of Aubigné
- Location within France Location within Brittany
- Coordinates: 48°17′43″N 1°38′01″W
- Country: France
- Region: Brittany
- Department: Ille-et-Vilaine
- Arrondissement: Rennes
- Canton: Val-Couesnon
- Intercommunality: CC Val Ille-Aubigné

Government
  - Mayor (2020–2026): Youri Moysan
- Area^{1}: 2.20 km^{2} (0.85 sq mi)
- Highest elevation: 87 m (285 ft)
- Lowest elevation: 52 m (171 ft)
- Population (2023): 453
  - Density: 206/km^{2} (533/sq mi)
- Time zone: UTC+01:00 (CET)
  - Summer (DST): UTC+02:00 (CEST)
- INSEE/Postal code: 35007 /35250
- ^{1} French Land Register data, which excludes lakes, ponds, glaciers > 1 km^{2} (0.386 sq mi or 247 acres) and river estuaries.

Aubigné (French pronunciation: [obiɲe]; Breton: Elvinieg; Gallo: Aubeinyae) is a commune located in the Ille-et-Vilaine department in Brittany in northwestern France.

== Population ==
Historical population
Year	Pop.	±% p.a.
1968	161	—
1975	157	−0.36%
1982	235	+5.93%
1990	237	+0.11%
1999	240	+0.14%
2007	348	+4.75%
2012	473	+6.33%
2017	474	+0.04%
2023	453	−0.75%
Source: INSEE

Inhabitants of Aubigné are called Aubinois in French.

== See also ==
- Communes of the Ille-et-Vilaine department
