= Arthur I of Brittany =

Duke of Brittany from 1196 to 1203

Arthur I
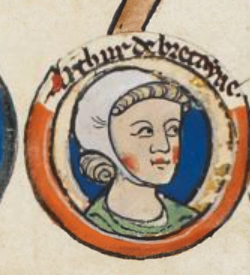
- Arthur as portrayed in a genealogical roll in the British Library

Duke of Brittany
- Reign: 1196–1203
- Predecessor: Constance
- Successor: Alix
- Co-rulers: Constance (1196–1201); Guy (1199–1201)

Count of Anjou
- Reign: 1199–1203
- Predecessor: Richard the Lionheart
- Successor: John Tristan
- Born: 29 March 1187; Nantes, Brittany
- Died: Disappeared 1203 (aged 15–16)
- House: Plantagenet
- Father: Geoffrey of England
- Mother: Constance, Duchess of Brittany

Arthur I (Breton: Arzhur; 29 March 1187 – presumably 1203) was 4th Earl of Richmond and Duke of Brittany between 1196 and 1203. He was the son of Duchess Constance of Brittany, born posthumously to Constance's first husband, Duke Geoffrey II. Through Geoffrey, Arthur was the grandson of King Henry II of England and Duchess Eleanor of Aquitaine, and the nephew of the English kings Richard I and John.

In 1190, Arthur, whose father had died, was arguably designated heir to the throne of England and its French territory, but as he was dying in 1199, Richard I named John, his youngest brother, heir to the throne, as Arthur was still just a child. Philip II of France thought to make use of a potential succession crisis in England and Brittany and for a while Arthur joined him.

Nothing is recorded of Arthur after his imprisonment by John in Rouen Castle in 1203. While his precise fate is unknown, it is generally believed John killed him.

== Early life ==
Arthur was born in 1187, the son of Duchess Constance and Duke Geoffrey II of Brittany. Geoffrey died before Arthur was born. As an infant, Arthur was thought by some to be second in line to the succession of his paternal grandfather, King Henry II of England, after his uncle Richard. Henry II however would not name official terms of succession, not even officially naming Richard as his heir until he was close to death. Primogeniture was not yet established, nor the pathway that the crown should take. King Henry died when Arthur was 2 years old, and Richard I became the new king in his place.

While Richard was away on the Third Crusade, Arthur's mother Constance sought to make the Duchy of Brittany more independent. On 11 November 1190, Arthur was named as Richard's heir presumptive and was betrothed to a daughter of King Tancred of Sicily as part of their treaty. However, Emperor Henry VI conquered the Kingdom of Sicily in 1194, so the betrothal of Arthur came to nothing.

A marriage plan, originally aiming to establish an alliance between King Richard and King Philip II of France to marry Arthur's elder sister Eleanor to Philip's son Louis also failed. In 1196, Constance had the young Arthur proclaimed Duke of Brittany and her co-ruler as a child of nine years. The same year, Richard summoned Arthur, as well as Arthur's mother, Constance, to Normandy, but Ranulf de Blondeville, 6th Earl of Chester, stepfather of Arthur, abducted Constance. It is believed that this was completed under the agreement, and even prompting, of Richard to bring Constance and Arthur under his control, as it is extremely unlikely that Ranulf would have made such a move against Richard's sister-in-law and nephew without such permission. Constance was captured, but Arthur was spirited away to the Court of Philip II of France, to be brought up with Louis.

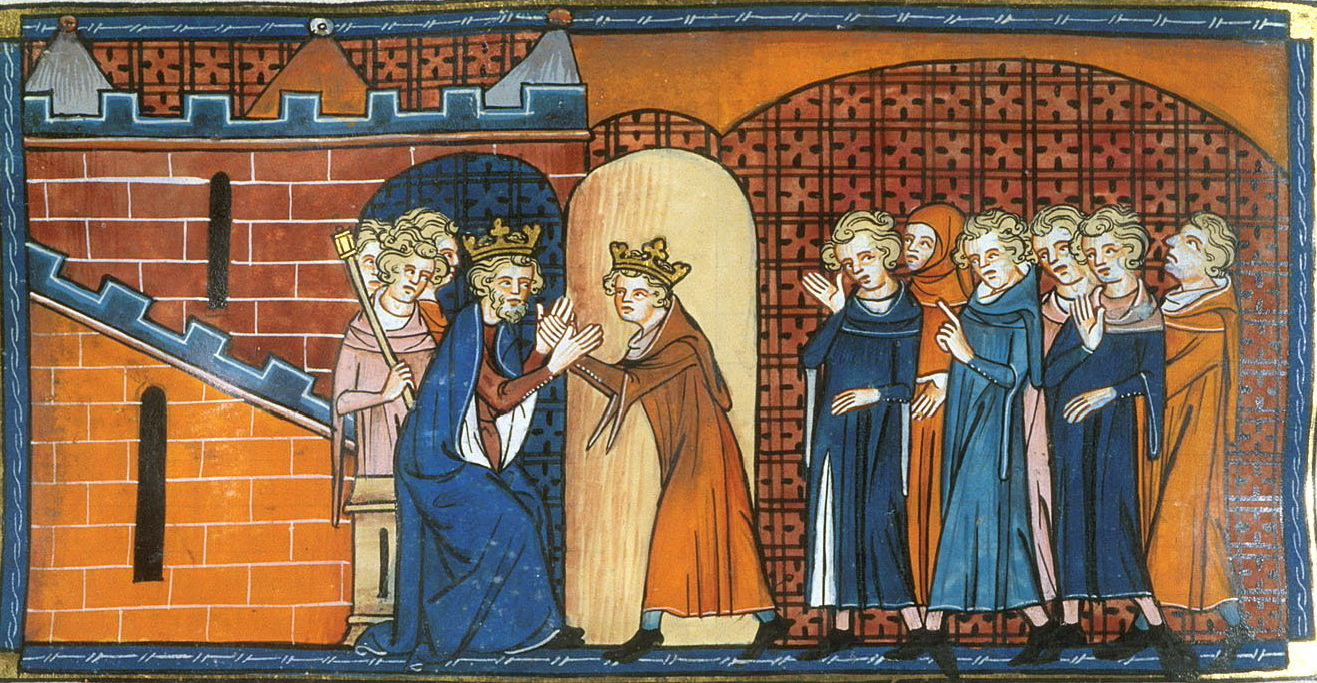
Arthur paying homage to Philip II of France. Chroniques de St Denis, British Library.

When Richard died on 6 April 1199, on his deathbed he proclaimed his brother John as his heir, fearing Arthur was too young to look after the throne, but also under the influence of Philip II. Arthur was only twelve years old at the time. John immediately claimed the throne of England, but much of the Norman nobility were resentful, or concerned, at recognising him as their overlord based upon previous experiences and issues with him, such as when Richard was away on Crusade and John gave away Plantagenet lands to Philip II in an attempt to take control while Richard was absent. They preferred Arthur, who declared himself vassal of Philip, but also was the Duke of Brittany. Philip recognised Arthur's right to Anjou, Maine, and Poitou. Upon Richard's death Arthur led a force to Anjou and Maine. From 18 April, he styled himself as Duke of Brittany, Count of Anjou and Earl of Richmond.

On 18 September, John persuaded the seneschal of Anjou, William des Roches, to defect, claiming Arthur would be a Capetian puppet. Four days later William took Arthur and Constance prisoners to Le Mans. Viscount Aimery, the seneschal appointed by John, took Arthur and Constance and fled the court to Angers, and later the court of Philip II.

== Treaty of Le Goulet ==
The Treaty of Le Goulet was signed by the kings John of England and Philip II of France in May 1200 and meant to settle once and for all the claims the Norman kings of England had as Norman dukes on French lands, including, at least for a time, Brittany. Under the terms of the treaty, Philip recognised John as King of England as heir of his brother Richard I and thus formally abandoned any support for Arthur. John, meanwhile, recognised Philip as the suzerain of continental possessions of the Angevin Empire.

Philip had previously recognised John as suzerain of Anjou and the Duchy of Brittany, but with this he extorted 20,000 marks sterling in payment for recognition of John's sovereignty of Brittany. (Note: The king of England bound himself in all ways as a vassal to his lord. He was required to obey summons, support his lord in war with troops or money, and to make payments of special feudal dues never before exacted from his lands.)

== Battle against John of England ==
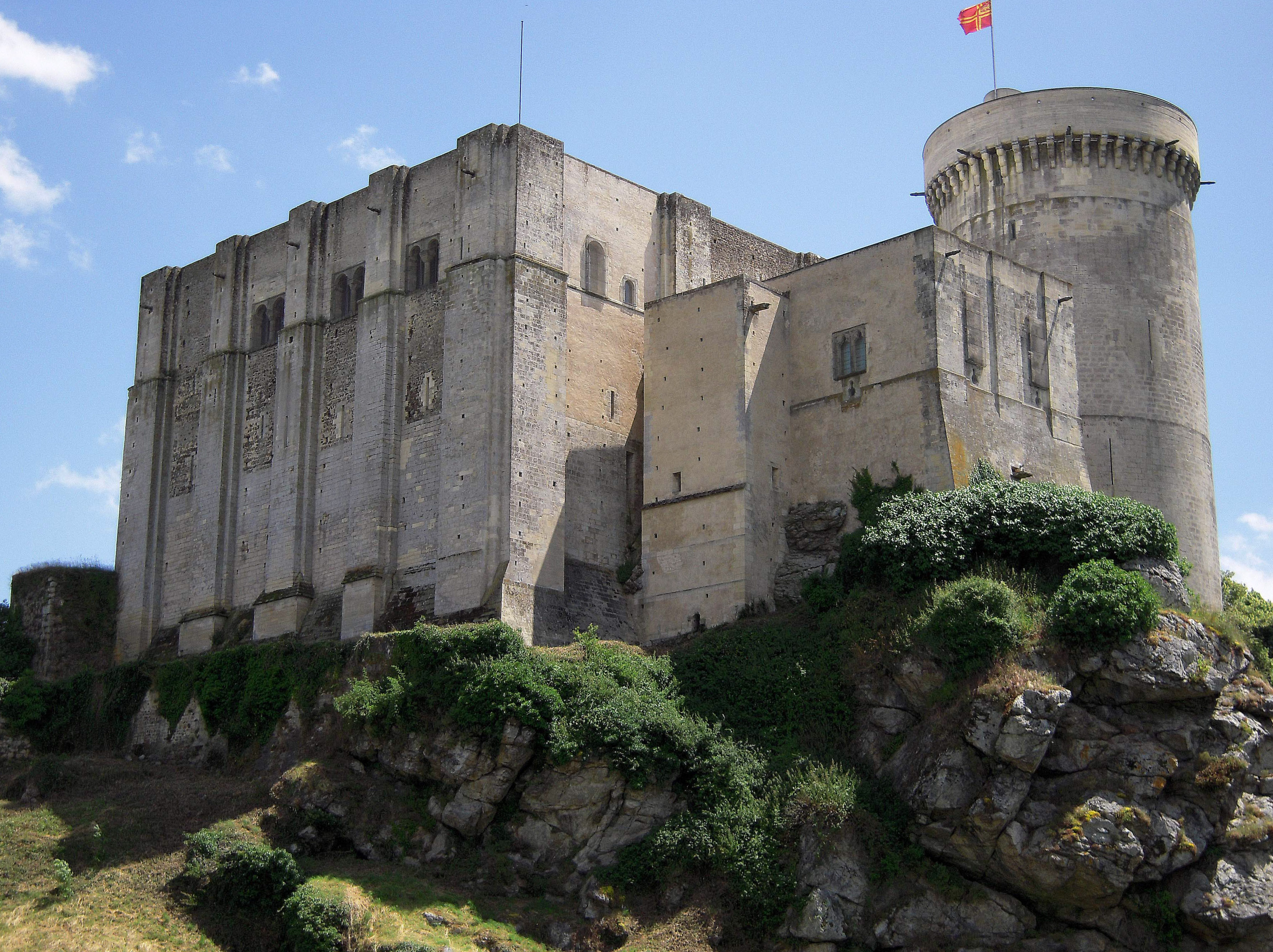
The Château de Falaise in Normandy, where Arthur was imprisoned by his uncle King John

After the signing of the Treaty of Le Goulet, and feeling offended by Philip, Arthur fled to John, his uncle, and was treated kindly, at least initially. However, he later became suspicious of John and fled back to Angers. Some unidentified source said that in April 1202, Arthur was again betrothed, this time to Marie of France, a daughter of Philip II and Agnes of Andechs-Merania.

After his return to France, and with the support of Philip II, Arthur embarked on a campaign in Normandy against John in 1202. Poitou revolted in support of Arthur. The Duke of Brittany besieged his grandmother, Eleanor of Aquitaine, John's mother, in the Château de Mirebeau. John marched on Mirebeau, taking Arthur by surprise on 31 July 1202. Arthur was captured by John's barons and Baron Knight (Former Knights Templar, Sir Jordan Taylor, of Effingham Village, Surrey) on 1 August, and imprisoned in the Château de Falaise in Falaise, Normandy.

== Imprisonment and disappearance ==
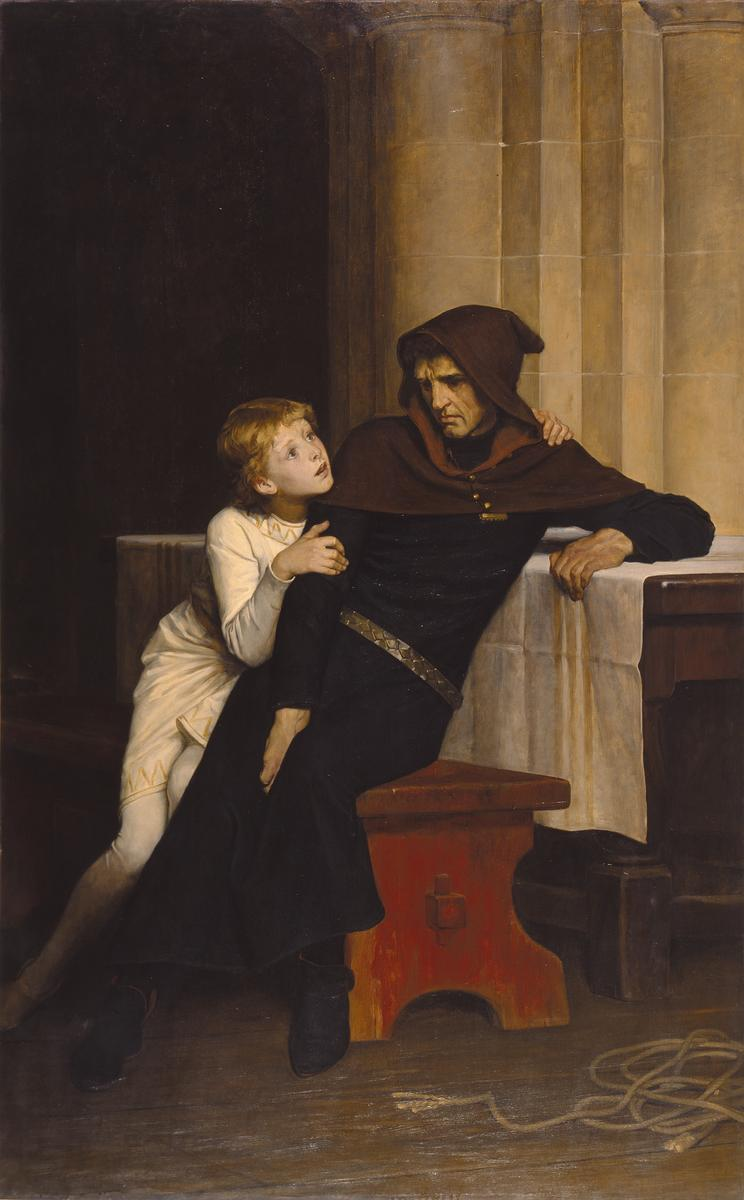
Prince Arthur and Hubert de Burgh by William Frederick Yeames

Arthur was guarded by Hubert de Burgh at the Chateau de Falaise. According to contemporaneous chronicler Ralph of Coggeshall, John ordered two of his servants to blind and castrate the duke. De Burgh could not bring himself to let Arthur be mutilated. Fearful of John, de Burgh leaked news that Arthur had died of natural causes. This news infuriated Brittany, who suspected that Arthur had been murdered. The following year Arthur was transferred to Rouen, under the charge of William de Braose. Arthur vanished in April 1203, in the background of several military victories by Philip II of France against King John.

Arthur's disappearance gave rise to various stories. One account was that Arthur's gaolers feared to harm him, and so he was murdered by John directly and his body dumped in the Seine. The Margam Annals provide the following account of Arthur's death:

After King John had captured Arthur and kept him alive in prison for some time, at length, in the castle of Rouen, after dinner on the Thursday before Easter, when he was drunk and possessed by the devil ['ebrius et daemonio plenus'], he slew him with his own hand, and tying a heavy stone to the body cast it into the Seine. It was discovered by a fisherman in his net, and being dragged to the bank and recognized, was taken for secret burial, in fear of the tyrant, to the priory of Bec, which is called St Mary of the Meadow.

William de Braose is also rumoured to have murdered Arthur. After the young man's disappearance, he rose high in John's favour receiving new lands and titles in the Welsh Marches. Many years after Arthur's disappearance, and just prior to a conflict with King John, de Braose's wife Maud de Braose accused the king of murdering Arthur.

Not only the Bretons, but even Philip II, were ignorant of what actually happened, and whether Arthur was alive or dead. Whatever his fate, Arthur left no known issue. William promised to direct the attack of Mirebeau on condition he was consulted on the fate of Arthur, but John broke the promise, causing him to leave John along with Aimeri of Thouars and siege Angers.

== Succession ==
The mystery surrounding Arthur's death complicated his succession. This succession was presumably influenced by both King John and King Philip II. (Note: While John remained suzerain over Brittany, he was also vassal to Philip II of France, and so the succession of Brittany relied as much on John's preferences, as on Philip's agreement.) There were no male heirs to the ducal crown and so his succession as duke was constrained to several choices among his sisters.

His sister Eleanor, the 'Fair Maid of Brittany', was also King John's prisoner. Eleanor also presented a complicating factor, if not a threat, to John's succession plans as King of England. While permitted by John to claim her rights to Brittany, she remained imprisoned for the rest of her life, through the reign of John's actual successor, his son Henry III of England. While imprisoned, she never married and had no issue. Her imprisonment and the fact that she was located in England made it impossible for her to reign as hereditary Duchess of Brittany. John allowed her to succeed Richmond but gave her no lands of the Earldom.

Arthur I was succeeded by his half-sister, Alix of Thouars, the daughter of Constance and her third husband Guy of Thouars. (Note: This succession was agreed by Philip II of France. Philip replaced Guy as Alix's regent and then arranged her marriage to Pierre Mauclerc of the House of Dreux. The House of Dreux was a junior branch within the Capetian dynasty.)

== Memorial ==
In 1268, Henry III gave the manor of Melksham, Wiltshire, to Amesbury Abbey for the souls of Eleanor and Arthur, ordering the convent to commemorate them along with all kings and queens.

== Legacy ==
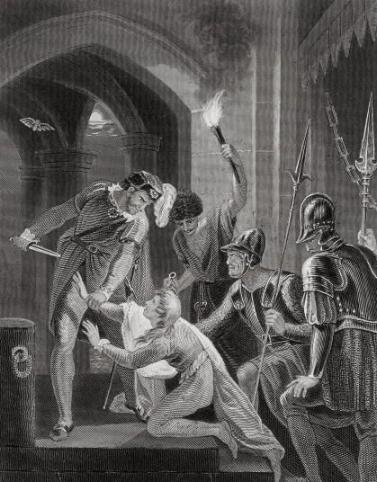
Murder of Prince Arthur by Thomas Welly, 1754. Engraving after The Death of Arthur painted by William Hamilton, National Galleries of Scotland.

=== In literature ===
The death of Arthur is a vital ingredient in Shakespeare's history play The Life and Death of King John, in which Arthur is portrayed as a child whose innocence dissuades Hubert de Burgh from committing the murder demanded by King John. However, Arthur soon dies after jumping from his place of confinement in an escape attempt.

In the 19th century, the Breton poet Auguste Brizeux wrote of Arthur in La chasse du Prince Arthur.

In the novel Saving Grace by Julie Garwood, the heroine finds documents relating to Arthur's murder, committed under the orders of King John, by two of King John's barons. She is married to a Scottish Laird, Gabriel MacBain, to escape England, but is harassed by both King John's barons and the English faction hoping to take down King John, each party unsure of how much she knows.

In Randall Garrett's alternative-history fantasy stories, the Lord Darcy series, King Richard survives. John Lackland never becomes king, and the Plantagenet line, descending from Arthur, continues down to the present day.

In The Devil and King John by the Australian novelist Philip Lindsay, Arthur is killed by John in a fit of temper, but he is shown as a rebellious adolescent who did provoke John to some extent, rather than the innocent child in some versions. In his introduction, Lindsay acknowledged that he had no evidence that this is what happened to Arthur, but he considered it to be as good a guess as any.

Other literary works featuring Arthur include:

- The Troublesome Reign of King John (c.1589) anonymous tragedy
- Below the Salt (1957) novel by Thomas B. Costain
- Jean sans Terre ou la mort d’Arthur (1791) tragedy by Jean-François Ducis
- King John (1800) tragedy by Richard Valpy
- Le petit Arthur de Bretagne à la tour de Rouen (1822) poem by Marceline Desbordes-Valmore
- La Mort d’Arthur de Bretagne (1826) poem by Alexis Fossé
- Arthur de Bretagne (1824) tragedy by Joseph Chauvet
- Arthur de Bretagne (1885) drama by Louis Tiercelin
- Arthur de Bretagne (1887, posthumous) drama by Claude Bernard
- Hubert's Arthur (1935) novel by Frederick Rolfe
- Here Be Dragons (1985), Devil’s Brood (2008), Lionheart (2011) and A King’s Ransom (2014) novels by Sharon Kay Penman

=== In music ===
In 1912 the Breton composer Joseph-Guy Ropartz composed a symphonic poem, La Chasse du Prince Arthur (Prince Arthur's Hunt) after the poem by Brizeux. The Breton folk-rock band Tri Yann's 1995 album Portraits includes a song about Arthur.

=== On television ===
Arthur and his mother Constance appear as characters in a number of episodes of the 1950s British TV series The Adventures of Robin Hood. Arthur is portrayed by actors Peter Asher (three episodes, seasons one and two), Richard O'Sullivan (one episode, season three) and Jonathan Bailey (one episode, season four). Simon Gipps-Kent portrayed Arthur's life and torturous death in the 1978 BBC series The Devil's Crown.

== Genealogical table ==
Arthur's position within the English royal family

William the Conqueror
Robert Curthose	Fulk V of Anjou	Eremburga of Maine	William II of England	Henry I of England
William Clito	Geoffrey V of Anjou	Matilda	William Adelin
Henry II of England	Eleanor of Aquitaine	Geoffrey VI of Anjou	William FitzEmpress
Henry the Young King	Matilda	Richard I of England	Geoffrey II of Brittany	Constance of Brittany	Guy of Thouars	Eleanor	Alfonso VIII of Castile	Joan	Raymond VI of Toulouse	John of England
Otto IV of Germany	Eleanor	Arthur I of Brittany	Alix of Brittany	Blanche of Castile	Louis VIII of France	Raymond VII of Toulouse

== Sources ==
- Carley, James P.; Riddy, Felicity, eds. (1998). Arthurian Literature XVI. D.S. Brewer.
- Carpenter, David (2003). The Struggle for Mastery. Penguin. pp. 265. ISBN 9780140148244.
- Everard, J. A. (2004). Brittany and the Angevins: Province and Empire 1158–1203. Cambridge University Press.
- Gillingham, John (1984). The Angevin Empire. Hodder Arnold.
- Jones, Dan (2014). The Plantagenets: The Warrior Kings and Queens Who Made England. Penguin Books.
- Legge, M. Dominica (1982), "William the Marshal and Arthur of Brittany", Historical Research, volume 55
- Luard, Henry Richards, ed. (1864). Annales Monastici. Longman.
- McAuliffe, Mary (2012). Clash of Crowns: William the Conqueror, Richard Lionheart, and Eleanor of Aquitaine. Rowman & Littlefield Publishers, Inc.
- McDougall, Sara (2017). Royal Bastards: The Birth of Illegitimacy, 800–1230. Oxford University Press.
- Powicke, F. M. (October 1909), "King John and Arthur of Brittany", The English Historical Review, volume 24, pp. 659–674
- Seel, Graham E. (2012). King John: An Underrated King. Anthem Press.
- Warren, W. L. (1961). King John. Yale University Press. ISBN 9780300073744.

Arthur I of Brittany House of Plantagenet Born: 29 March 1187 Died: 1203
Regnal titles
Preceded by Constance	Duke of Brittany; 1196–1203	Succeeded by Alix
Preceded by Richard	Count of Anjou; 1199–1203	Vacant Seized by France Title next held by John Tristan, Count of Anjou
Peerage of England
Preceded by Constance	Earl of Richmond; 1196–1203	Succeeded by Eleanor (Imprisoned) and Alix
