= Arthur Le Moyne de La Borderie =

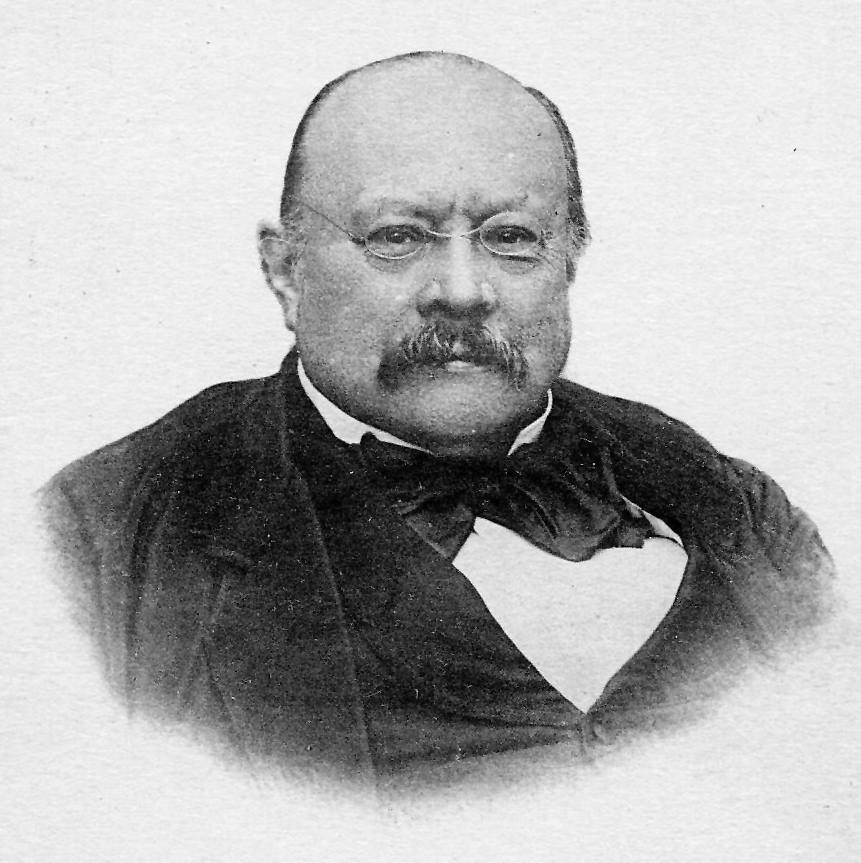

Arthur Le Moyne de La Borderie (5 October 1827, Vitré, Ille-et-Vilaine – 17 February 1901, Vitré) was a Breton historian, regarded as a father of Brittany's historiography.

== Life ==
He came from La Borderie, which was an estate in the commune of Étrelles.

After studying law, he entered the École Nationale des Chartes. He left it in 1852 and from 1853 to 1859 worked in the archives of Loire-Inférieure. He was a founder member of the Société archéologique et historique d'Ille-et-Vilaine, of which he was president from 1863 to 1890.

Gaining recognition for his innumerable works on the history of Brittany, he enlivened research in many areas and inspired many historians by his influence and example. He was the director of the historic review Revue de Bretagne et Vendée (published from 1867 to 1900) that he founded aged 25.

He had been elected conseiller général of Ille-et-Vilaine from 1864 to 1871 then, the same year, député for Vitré, until 1876. In this role he was reporter of the Commission d'enquête sur les actes du gouvernement de la défense nationale (Commission of Inquiry into the Acts of the Government of National Defence). In particular he led the investigation into events at Camp Conlie where 50,000 Breton soldiers were held and supposedly mistreated in 1871. His report was overwhelmingly critical of the French army, which demonstrated a total lack of organization.

In the years after the Franco-Prussian War he re-formed the Association bretonne which had been dissolved as suspect by the government of Napoléon III. A large part of his library is now in the town library of Rennes, while the huge collection of original documents which he amassed is now housed in the departmental archives of Ille-et-Vilaine.

== Works ==
- Louis de La Trémoille et la guerre de Bretagne en 1488, d'après des documents nouveaux et inédits, Paris: Champion, 1877.
- Correspondance historique des Bénédictins bretons et autres documents historiques associés, relatifs à leurs travaux sur l'Histoire de Bretagne. Publiés avec notes et introductions par Arthur de la Borderie, Paris Champion, 1880.
- Chronique de Jean de Saint-Paul, chambellan du duc François II de Bretagne, Nantes: Société des bibliophiles Bretons, 1881.
- Complot breton de M.CCC.XCII [1492]. Documents inédits, publiés avec des notes et introduction par… Archives de Bretagne. II. Recueil d'actes, de chroniques et de documents rares et inédits, publié par la Société des bibliophiles bretons et de l'histoire de Bretagne, 1884.
- La Révolte du Papier timbré advenue en Bretagne en 1675, Saint-Brieuc: Prud'homme, 1884, reprinted in Les Bonnets Rouges, Union Générale d'Éditions (collection 10/18), Paris, 1975 (voir Révolte des Bonnets Rouges).
- Recueil d'actes inédits des ducs et princes de Bretagne. (11th-13th centuries), Rennes: Imprimerie Ch. Catel, 1888.
- Cartulaire de l'abbaye de Landévennec, avec notes et variantes, Rennes: Imprimerie de Ch. Catel, 1888.
- Une illustration rennaise - Alexandre Duval, de l'Académie française et son théâtre, Rennes: H. Caillière, 1893.
- Histoire municipale de la ville de Tréguier - Documents inédits du XVIe et du XVIIe siècle, publiés avec notes et introduction. Rennes: J. Plihon & L. Hervé, 1894.
- Œuvres nouvelles Des Forges Maillard, Nantes, Société des bibliophiles Bretons, 1888 (editor with René Kerviler).
- Jean Meschinot, sa vie et ses œuvres, ses satires contre Louis XI. Paris: Champion, 1896.
- Nouveau Recueil d'actes inédits des ducs et princes de Bretagne (XIIIe & XIVe siècles), Rennes: Prost, 1902.
- Histoire de Bretagne, Rennes: Plihon, Honnay et Vatar, 1896–1914 (6 vol.). Reprinted Joseph Floch Imprimeur Éditeur à Mayenne 1975.
