= Geoffrey II of Brittany =

Duke of Brittany from 1181 to 1186

Geoffrey II
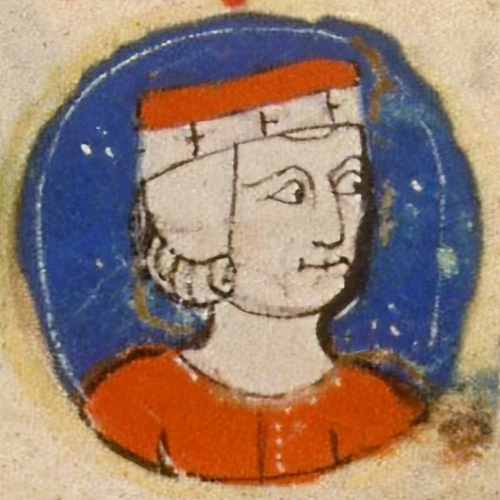

Duke of Brittany
- Reign: July 1181 – 19 August 1186
- Predecessor: Constance
- Successor: Constance
- Co-ruler: Constance
- Born: 23 September 1158
- Died: 19 August 1186 (aged 27); Paris, France
- Burial: Notre Dame de Paris
- Spouse: Constance, Duchess of Brittany (m. 1181)
- Issue Detail: Eleanor, Fair Maid of Brittany; Arthur I, Duke of Brittany
- House: Plantagenet-Angevin (Note: Historians are divided in their use of the terms Plantagenet and Angevin in regard to Henry II and his children. Some class Henry II to be the first Plantagenet king of England; others refer to Henry II, Richard I, and John as the Angevin dynasty, and consider Henry III to be the first Plantagenet ruler.)
- Father: Henry II, King of England
- Mother: Eleanor, Duchess of Aquitaine

Geoffrey II (Breton: Jafrez; Latin: Galfridus, Anglo-Norman: Geoffroy; 23 September 1158 – 19 August 1186) was Duke of Brittany and Earl of Richmond between 1181 and 1186, through his marriage to Constance, Duchess of Brittany. Geoffrey was the fourth of five sons of Henry II of England and Eleanor of Aquitaine.

== Life ==
In the 1160s, Henry II began to alter his policy of indirect rule in Brittany and to exert more direct control. Henry had been at war with Conan IV, Duke of Brittany. Local Breton nobles rebelled against Conan, so Conan sought Henry II's help. In 1164, Henry intervened to seize lands along the border of Brittany and Normandy and, in 1166, he invaded Brittany to punish the local barons. Henry then forced Conan to abdicate as duke and to give Brittany to his five-year-old daughter, Constance, who was handed over and betrothed to Henry's son Geoffrey. This arrangement was quite unusual in terms of medieval law, as Conan might have had sons who could have legitimately inherited the duchy. (Note: Henry never formally became Duke of Brittany as he was only holding the duchy on behalf of Geoffrey and Constance.) Geoffrey and Constance eventually married, in July 1181.

Geoffrey was fifteen years old when he joined the first revolt against his father. He later reconciled to Henry in 1174 when he participated in the truce at Gisors. (Note: The meetings leading to the Truce of Gisors probably occurred at the Château de Gisors which had been built by Henry I of England.) (Note: Richard was absent from Gisors and would reconcile with Henry II later at a place between Tours and Amboise.) Geoffrey prominently figured in the second revolt of 1183, fighting against Richard, on behalf of Henry the Young King.

Geoffrey was a good friend of Louis VII's son Philip, and the two men were frequently in alliance against Henry. Geoffrey spent much time at Philip's court in Paris, and Philip made him his seneschal. There is evidence to suggest that Geoffrey was planning another rebellion with Philip's help during his final period in Paris in the summer of 1186. As a participant in so many rebellions against his father, Geoffrey acquired a reputation for treachery. Gerald of Wales wrote the following of him:

He has more aloes than honey in him; his tongue is smoother than oil; his sweet and persuasive eloquence has enabled him to dissolve the firmest alliances and by his powers of language able to corrupt two kingdoms; of tireless endeavour, a hypocrite in everything, a deceiver and a dissembler.

Geoffrey also was known to attack monasteries and churches in order to raise funds for his campaigns. This lack of reverence for religion earned him the displeasure of the Church and, as a consequence, of the majority of chroniclers who wrote about his life.

== Family ==
Geoffrey and Constance had three children, one born after Geoffrey's death:

- Eleanor, Fair Maid of Brittany (1184–1241)
- Maud/Matilda of Brittany (1185–before May 1189)
- Arthur I, Duke of Brittany (1187–1203?)

== Death ==
Geoffrey died on 19 August 1186, at the age of 27, in Paris. There is also evidence that supports a death date of 21 August 1186. There are two alternative accounts of his death. The more common first version holds that he was trampled to death in a jousting tournament. At his funeral, a grief-stricken Philip is said to have tried to jump into the coffin. Roger of Hoveden's chronicle is the source of this version; the detail of Philip's hysterical grief is from Gerald of Wales.

In the second version, in the chronicle of the French royal clerk Rigord, Geoffrey died of sudden acute chest pain, which reportedly struck immediately after his speech to Philip, boasting his intention to lay Normandy to waste. Possibly, this version was an invention of its chronicler, sudden illness being God's judgment of an ungrateful son plotting rebellion against his father, and for his irreligiosity. Alternatively, the tournament story may be an invention of Philip in trying to prevent Henry II discovering a plot; by inventing a social reason, a tournament, for Geoffrey's being in Paris, Philip could have obscured their meeting's true purpose.

Marie of Champagne, with whom Geoffrey was on good terms, was present at the requiem for her half-brother and established a mass chantry for the repose of his soul.

Geoffrey was buried in the choir of Notre-Dame de Paris cathedral, but his tombstone was destroyed in 1699.

After Geoffrey's death, Henry II arranged for Constance, Geoffrey's widow, to marry Ranulf de Blondeville, 6th Earl of Chester. Ranulf would become Duke of Brittany, jure uxoris, for a short time before this marriage was annulled.

== Poetry ==
Geoffrey is the probable author of two vernacular Old French poems in the trouvère style. Both are debate poems or jeux-partis and possibly the earliest examples of the type. One of these is the bilingual poem Jauseme, quel vos est semblant, in which the "count of Brittany" (coms de Bretagna) poses a question to the troubadour Gaucelm Faidit, who responds in Old Occitan rather than French. As the poem identifies the debaters merely as the count of Brittany and Gaucelm, there has been some debate about their identities, but Geoffrey is accepted as the most probable candidate for the count. The topic of the debate is whether making love should be the first thing or the last thing lovers do when meeting. Geoffrey takes the latter position.

In his other known work, Gasse, par droit me respondez, Geoffrey poses a question to the trouvère Gace Brulé. Gace addresses his interlocutor simply as sire, but the heading in one manuscript identifies the question poser as the "count of Brittany" (keu de Bretaigne). Gace also mentions his time in Brittany in another poem and in three other poems he addresses Geoffrey in the envoi, twice by name and once by title (count). It has been speculated that Geoffrey's court may have been the location where the jeu-parti of the trouvères was picked up by the troubadours, becoming the Occitan partimen.

== Portrayals ==
=== In literature ===
Geoffrey II of Brittany is a major character in the play The Lion in Winter (1966) by James Goldman where his portrayal is reminiscent of that made by Gerald of Wales, and in the novel Devil's Brood (2008) by Sharon Kay Penman. He is also mentioned in the tragedies The Troublesome Reign of King John (anonymous, c.1589), King John (1593–1596) by William Shakespeare and King John by Richard Valpy, the poem Le petit Arthur de Bretagne à la tour de Rouen (1822) by Marceline Desbordes-Valmore, the drama Arthur de Bretagne (1885) by Louis Tiercelin and the novels Lionheart (2011) and A King's Ransom (2014) by Sharon Kay Penman, as well as in the second volume of the trilogy Le Château des Poulfenc (2009) by Brigitte Coppin.

=== In theatre and television ===
Geoffrey has been portrayed by John Castle in the movie The Lion in Winter (1968) and by John Light in the 2003 made-for-TV remake. He has also been portrayed by Austin Somervell (as a boy) and Martin Neil (as an adult) in the BBC TV drama series The Devil's Crown (1978).

== Genealogical table ==
Geoffrey's position within the English royal family

Fulk V of Anjou	Eremburga of Maine	Matilda of Scotland	Henry I of England
Geoffrey V of Anjou	Matilda	William Adelin	Matilda
Henry II of England	Eleanor of Aquitaine	Geoffrey VI of Anjou	William FitzEmpress	Bertha of Brittany
Henry the Young King	Matilda	Richard I of England	Eleanor	Joan	John I of England	Conan IV of Brittany
Geoffrey II of Brittany	Constance of Brittany
Arthur I of Brittany	Eleanor

== See also ==
- Dukes of Brittany family tree
- British monarchs family tree

== Bibliography ==
- Costain, Thomas B. The Conquering Family, 1962
- Everard, Judith (1999). Charters of Duchess Constance of Brittany and her Family, 1171–1221.
- Everard, Judith. Brittany and the Angevins: Province and Empire, 1158–1203, 2000
- Gatti, Luca (2021). "Note al canzoniere di Gace Brulé: questioni onomastiche alla luce della tradizione manoscritta". Cognitive Philology (14).
- Gillingham, John. The Life and Times of Richard I, 1973
- Gillingham, John. Richard the Lionheart, 1978
- Gillihgham, John. Richard I, 1999
- Hamilton, J.S. (2010). The Plantagenets: History of a Dynasty. London: Continuum. ISBN 978-1-4411-5712-6. OL 28013041M.
- Harvey, Ruth; Paterson, Linda M. (2010). The Troubadour Tensos and Partimens: A Critical Edition. Boydell & Brewer.
- Reston, James. Warriors of God: Richard the Lion-Heart and Saladin in the Third Crusade, 2001
- Matheis, Eric (2014). Capital, Value, and Exchange in the Old Occitan and Old French Tenson (Including the Partimen and the Jeu-Parti) (PhD dissertation). Columbia University.
- Turner, Ralph V.; Heiser, Richard R (2000), The Reign of Richard Lionheart, Ruler of the Angevin empire, 1189–1199, Harlow: Longman, ISBN 978-0-582-25659-0
- Warren, W. L. (2000). Henry II.

Geoffrey II of Brittany House of Plantagenet Born: 23 September 1158 Died: 19 August 1186
Regnal titles
Preceded by Constance	Duke of Brittany jure uxoris 1181–1186 with Constance	Succeeded by Constance and Ranulph
Peerage of England
Preceded by Constance	Earl of Richmond; 1181–1186 with Constance	Succeeded by Constance
