= Madame de Sévigné (film) =

- Theatrical release poster
- Directed by: Isabelle Brocard
- Written by: Isabelle Brocard; Yves Thomas
- Produced by: Michaël Gentile
- Starring: Karin Viard; Ana Girardot; Cédric Kahn; Noémie Lvovsky; Robin Renucci
- Cinematography: George Lechaptois
- Edited by: Camille Delprat; Géraldine Mangenot
- Music by: Florencia Di Concilio
- Production companies: The Film; France 3 Cinéma; Ad Vitam; Orange Studio; Auvergne-Rhône-Alpes Cinéma
- Distributed by: Ad Vitam; Orange Studio
- Release dates: 26 August 2023 (Angoulême); 28 February 2024 (France)
- Running time: 93 minutes
- Country: France
- Language: French
- Budget: €5,031,000
- Box office: $1.6 million

Madame de Sévigné is a 2023 French historical drama film directed by Isabelle Brocard. It tells the story of Madame de Sévigné, who maintained a correspondence with her daughter, Françoise, the Countess of Grignan, who was passionate about French literature. The film stars Karin Viard in title role. It premiered on 26 August 2023 at the Angoulême Francophone Film Festival. It was released in France on 28 February 2024.

== Cast ==
- Karin Viard as Marie de Rabutin-Chantal, marquise de Sévigné
- Ana Girardot as Françoise de Sévigné
- Cédric Kahn as Monsieur de Grignan
- Noémie Lvovsky as Madame de La Fayette
- Robin Renucci as Monsieur de La Rochefoucauld
- Cyrille Mairesse as La petite personne
- Antoine Prud'homme de la Boussinière as Charles de Sévigné
- Alain Libolt as Cardinal de Retz
- Laurent Grévill as Roger de Rabutin, comte de Bussy
- Sava Lolov as Simon Arnauld, Marquis de Pomponne
- Benjamin Wangermee as Louis XIV

== Production ==
Several scenes in the film were shot at the Château de Grignan in the Drôme department, where Madame de Sévigné went on several occasions to see her daughter Françoise, who was married to François Adhémar de Monteil de Grignan. Filming also took place at the Château de Suze-la-Rousse as well as in Cornillon-sur-l'Oule at the Château de Fléchères in the Ain department, in the Île-de-France region, in Hauts-de-France and in Burgundy.

== Release ==
Madame de Sévigné was selected to be screened at the 16th Angoulême Francophone Film Festival, where it had its world premiere on 26 August 2023.

Ad Vitam distributed the film in France on 28 February 2024.
