= Beiser =

Beiser is a surname. Notable people with the surname include:

- Arthur Beiser, an American physicist
- Brendan Beiser (born 1970), Canadian actor
- Daniel V. Beiser, Democratic member of the Illinois House of Representatives
- Edward Beiser (1942–2009), Dean at Brown University, political scientist and a constitutional scholar.
- Frederick C. Beiser (born 1949), one of the leading scholars of German Idealism
- Maya Beiser (born 1963), American cellist
- Morton Beiser (born 1936), Canadian professor, psychiatrist, and epidemiologist
- Tim Beiser (born 1959), literary pseudonym of American-Canadian author and journalist J. Timothy Hunt
- Trude Beiser (born 1927), Austrian former alpine skier
- Vince Beiser (born 1965), American-Canadian journalist

== See also ==
- Ed Beisser (1919–2000), American basketball player
