= Manoir le Roure =

Coordinates: 44.5119°N 4.7567°E

The Manoir le Roure is situated in the South of Montélimar, as part of the commune of Chateauneuf-du-Rhône, in Drôme provençale. The historical manor whose origins are dated back to the 14th century by the historian De Coston, is surrounded by a vast park with bassins and ornamental lakes.

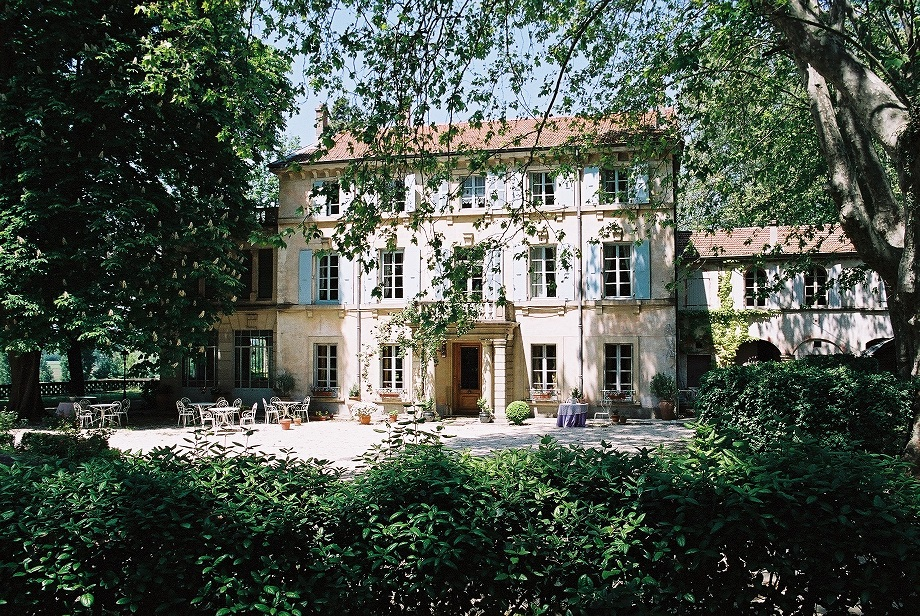
Southern facade of the Manoir le Roure

== History ==
According to the historian de Coston the genealogy of the Roure family can be traced back into the 14th century: There is Pons in 1385, Jean in 1400, Guillaume in 1450, Pierre in 1471, Mathieu in 1500, Antoine in 1512, Christophe in 1530 and Claude in 1544. The latter leaves the estate called "Roure" to his daughter Claudine and her husband Arnand Pertuis. Each of the first born sons of the following generations, Hector, Samuel, Josserand, Jacques und Joseph Pertuis are one after the other owner of the Manoir le Roure. According to several genealogists, bankruptcy led the Pertuis family to sell the Roure to the noble Alexande de Piolenc de Thoury, president of the parliament in Grenoble, who resold it in 1758 to Jacques-Daniel Nicolas. According to Coston, Zacharie Pascal was the owner of the Roure in 1652. He died in the same year and his heir, his son Florent, adopts the name Florent Pascal du Roure. When he dies childless, his brother Alexande Pascal du Roure inherits the property. Also childless, the Manoir is left to his sister Madelaine Pascal du Roure, wife of Daniel Livache, judge of the feudal court of Duc de Lesdiguières. Jacques-Daniel Nicolas, born August 24, 1719, son of Daniel Nicolas, bought the estate in 1758 and also added the "Roure" to his family name. With his wife Jeanne-Monique Laurans he had around ten children, amongst them Daniel and Joseph. February 1, 1785, Daniel Nicolas du Roure, born on July 9, 1759, marries Marie Rousset, daughter of Pirre Gaspard Rousset and Marie Faujas, who gave birth to six children, amongst them Daniel, who is born March 22, 1796. To differentiate himself, Joseph Nicolas du Roure, born November 1761, brother of Daniel Nicolas, adopts the name of "Jonquet", also for his property not far from the Manoir. January 14, 1793 he marries Clotilde Richon with whom he has to son who dies unmarried and a daughter, Clotilde Nicolas-Jonquet, born around 1800.

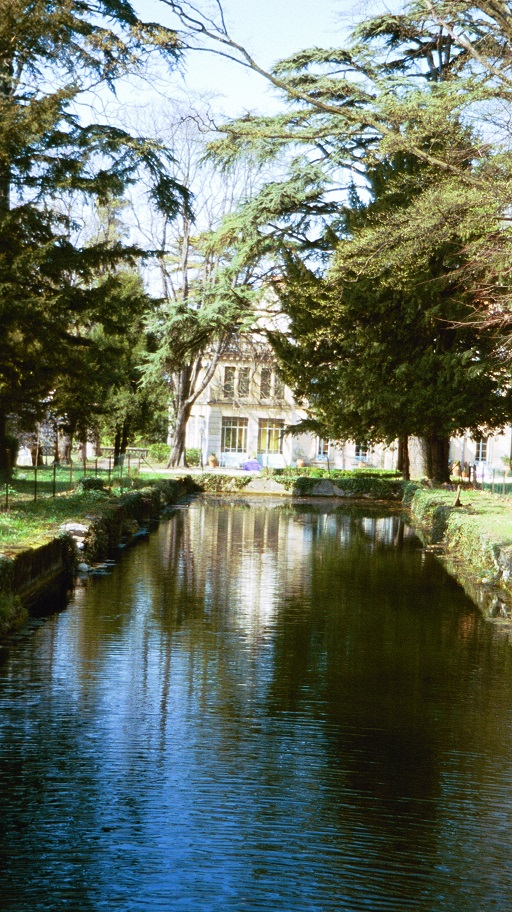
The bassin in the park of the Manoir le Roure

The two properties and names are joined on September 27, 1824, when Daniel Nicolas du Roure, son of Daniel and Marie Rousset, marries his cousin Clotilde Nicolas-Jonquet, daughter of Joseph Nicolas-Jonquet and Clotilde Richon. Daniel is elected maire of Montelimar in 1830 and dies in 1863. His wife outlives him by 18 years. She inherits the Jonquet property, but not the Roure that she rebuys in 1879 from Jean-Baptiste-Frédéric Chare (as marked in a newspaper article from September 4, 1879). She dies two years later without heirs. Her fortune of an estimated 306 000 Francs are donated to the Montélimar hospital, only the Manoir Le Roure is made over to her cousin Charles Rousset. The Rousset family is one of Montélimar's long-established communal families dating back into the 12th century. The for the history of the Manoir most important member of this family is born on December 6, 1847, in Montélimar, Charles-Louis-Marie-Joseph, shortly Charles Rousset. The young man is sergeant of the 32nd Infantry regiment, fights for the Metz army during the war and is held hostage. Back in France; he marries Marguerite-Émilie-Marie de Pina de Saint-Didier in 1889. After several promotions he is appointed brigadier general in 1905. 1909 he returns to the Manoir le Roure and undertakes large architectural changes. In 1959 Alfred-Hector Baillieux buys the Manoir from the Rousset family. After his death it sold to the eleven-person Deloye family who keeps it until 2001. On sale, it is in 2002 that the estate is bought by Mr and Mrs Lhopital who transform it into a four-star hotel.

== Construction ==
Since 1385 the estate contains vast agricultural buildings that border on the road and further in the south a wall that opens to a bog gate. Originally, the estate included a manor and a farm built out of Rhône pebbles. In the 17th century a cubic annex in an austere provençale style was added. At the end of the 18th century great changes for embellishment were undertaken. A further floor was built, the roof heightened and the direction of the pitch of the roof changed. The result was a Belle Époque manor, almost a castle with its tower and colonnades, a peristyle and an orangery that opens to the park. The Château de Grignan (made known by the Marquise de Sevigne who resided there many years) certainly influenced the architectural choices for the Manoir le Roure. The stained glass windows as well as the frescoes in warm coloring, dominated by ochre and saffron evoke an African reminiscence.

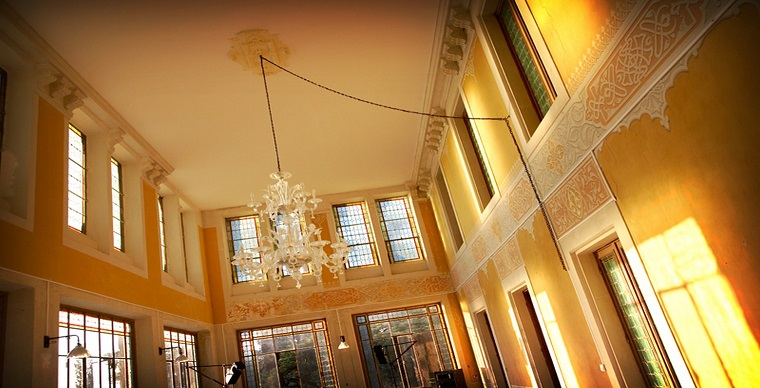
Orangery of the Manoir le Roure

The building was built to protect the terraces and the main building from the strong winds (Mistral). The most frequently used entrances are therefore found on the south side, whereas the few entrances on the north side are just enough to provide the lightning of the interior. The orangery and the terraces benefit from an orientation towards south southwest.

== The park ==
Since 2002 the property stretches over a terrain of four hectare that comprises besides other tree species approximately 40 planes of more than 40 height. They line the route départementale and the north entrance of the manoir. Lebanon cedars (more than 200 years old), a sequoia, seven chestnuts, linden, pines, poplars and oaks can also be found on the property. The park with its tall trees differs significantly from the surrounding vegetation. An explanation is maybe the fact that the property is served by three different sources. Until 1975 it was self-sufficient concerning the water supply.

== Bibliography ==
The manor was mentioned in several articles by Marylène Marcel-Ponthier, historian and annalist of the journal La Tribune, as well as in some of her volumes about the life of its owners. The historian De Coston provides the only contemporary source, preserved in the Montélimar media library, about the origins of the Manoir le Roure in his Volume 1 page 426 to 427, Volume 2 page 130 and 131, 106 and 107, Volume 4 page 240 to 243 as well as page 330, 331 and 448 to 449. The journals of Montélimar of March 8, 1879, September 22, 1900, September 28, 1907, and November 2, 1907, include publications concerning the different owners of the Manoir le Roure.
