= Rachel Berman =

Canadian painter and children's book illustrator

- Portrait by Sara Sniderman, 2010
- Born: Rachel Berman; 1946; New Orleans, Louisiana, United States
- Died: May 28, 2014 (aged 67–68); Victoria, British Columbia, Canada
- Known for: Painting

Study for A Saint About To Fall, 2000-2004. Collection of Lynda Walker and Jason Weedmark

Rachel Berman (raised as Susan King; 1946-May 28, 2014) was an American-born Canadian painter and children's book illustrator, who lived and worked in Canada, the United States, and Ireland.

Her paintings have been likened to the poems of Leonard Cohen, the plays of Harold Pinter, and "a season's worth of Masterpiece Theatre episodes." The mysterious figures and hidden stories glimpsed in her paintings are a reflection of the mysteries Berman has unravelled in her own life. Once known as Susan King, she discovered her original birth name, birth date, and the names of her biological parents when she was 52. This experience led her to reclaim her long-lost name.

Berman was born in New Orleans, Louisiana and lived in Victoria, British Columbia.

== Exhibitions ==
Berman exhibited extensively across Canada and internationally and was represented by Ingram Gallery in Toronto, Ontario.

International Art Fairs

- 2009 Toronto International Art Fair, Ingram Gallery, Toronto, ON
- 2008 Toronto International Art Fair, Ingram Gallery, Toronto, ON
- 2007 Toronto International Art Fair, Ingram Gallery, Toronto, ON
- 2006 Toronto International Art Fair, Ingram Gallery, Toronto, ON
- 2005 Toronto International Art Fair, Ingram Gallery, Toronto, ON
- 2004 Toronto International Art Fair, Ingram Gallery, Toronto, ON
- 2003 Toronto International Art Fair, Ingram Gallery, Toronto, ON
- 2002 Toronto International Art Fair, Ingram Gallery, Toronto, ON
- 2001 Toronto International Art Fair, Ingram Gallery, Toronto, ON

Solo Exhibitions

- 2009 Ingram Gallery, Toronto, ON, "Bradley McGogg, The Very Fine Frog"
- 2008 Ingram Gallery, Toronto, ON, "Hourglass"
- 2006 Ingram Gallery, Toronto, ON, "In a Station in a Metro"
- 2005 Ingram Gallery, Toronto, ON, "Or There or Elsewhere"
- 2003 Ingram Gallery, Toronto, ON, "An Optimism Under Heaven"
- 2001 Ingram Gallery, Toronto, ON, "Travelling"

Selected Group Exhibitions

- 2010 Ingram Gallery, Toronto, "Owles | Sniderhan | Berman"
- 2009 Ingram Gallery, Toronto, ON, "Summer Series"
- 2009 Ingram Gallery, Toronto, ON, "Works on Paper"
- 2005 Ingram Gallery, Toronto, ON, "Toy Box"
- 2004 Ingram Gallery, Toronto, ON, "Stumble Home - with Jon Claytor"
- 2004 Ingram Gallery, Toronto, ON, "Greyscale"
- 2004 Ingram Gallery, Toronto, ON, "Life of the Party"
- 2003 Ingram Gallery, Toronto, ON, "The Water Project - 67% Bodies of Water"
- 2002 Ingram Gallery, Toronto, ON, "Outside In"
- 2002 Ingram Gallery, Toronto, ON, "Figure Out"
- 2001 Ingram Gallery, Toronto, ON, "Cinematic Situation"
- 2000 Ingram Fine Art, Toronto, ON, "Artists for the New Millennium"

== Children's books ==
Rachel Berman is the illustrator of the following books:

- Pigmalion, written by Glenda Leznoff and published by Crocodile Books (December 2001)
- Bradley McGogg, the Very Fine Frog, written by Tim Beiser and published by Tundra Books (March 2009)
- Miss Mousie's Blind Date, written by Tim Beiser and published by Tundra Books (October 2012)

In 2009, and again in 2013, Rachel was nominated for the Governor General's award for English Language Children's Literature-Illustration.
