= Château des Rochers-Sévigné =

Gothic château in Ille-et-Vilaine, France

Coordinates: 48°04′51″N 1°10′08″W

Castle of Rochers-Sévigné
- Château des Rochers-Sévigné
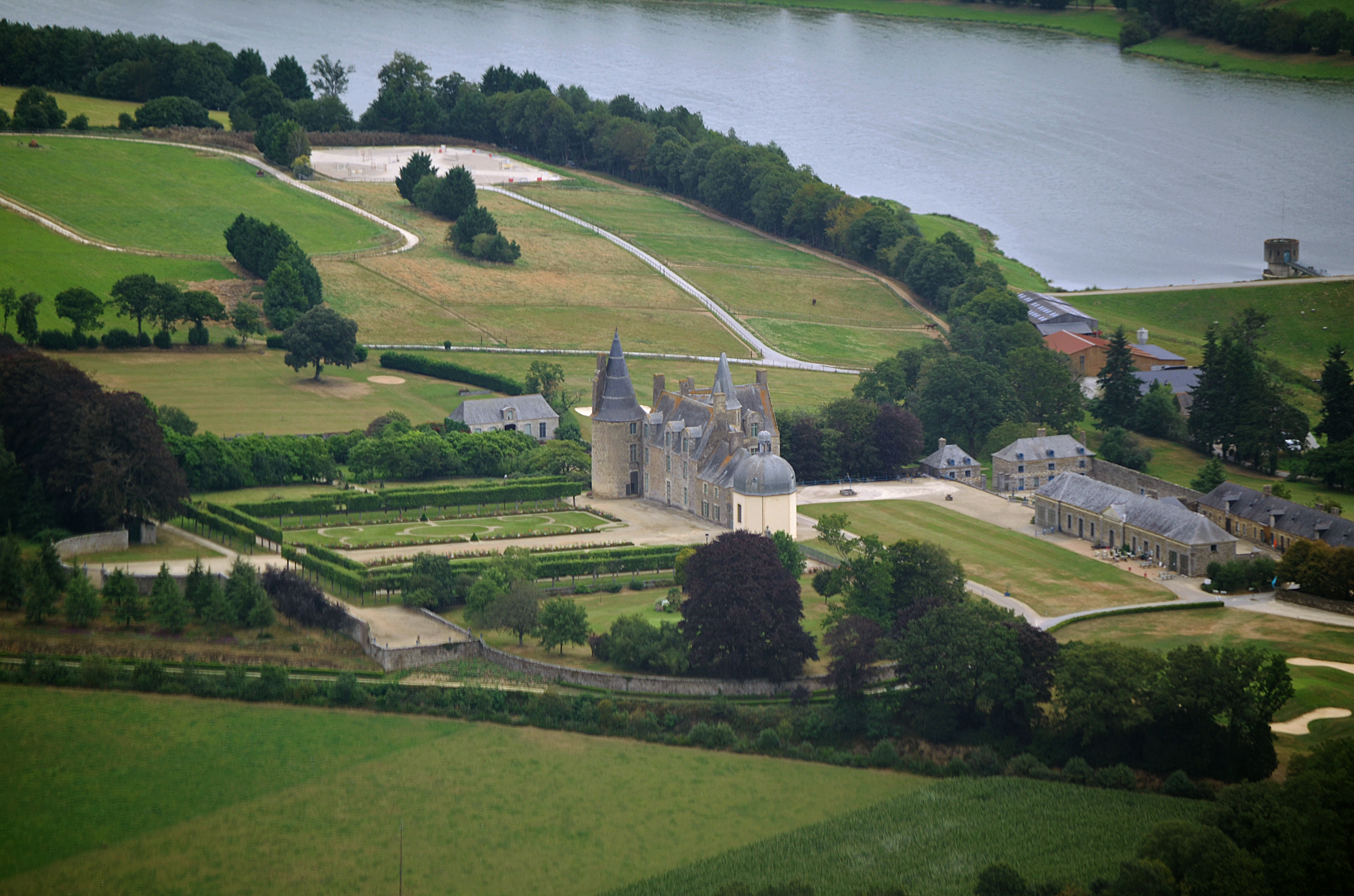
- Aerial view of the castle and its park.
- Interactive map of the Castle of Rochers-Sévigné area

General information
- Location: Vitré, Ille-et-Vilaine, Brittany, France
- Construction started: 16th century
- Construction stopped: 19th century
- Owner: Aviau de Ternay family

The château des Rochers-Sévigné, a former Breton residence of Madame de Sévigné, is a 15th-century Gothic manor house located near Vitré in Ille-et-Vilaine, France.

After partial inscriptions in 1942 and 1944, the château has been listed as a historical monument since March 20, 1995.

== Location ==
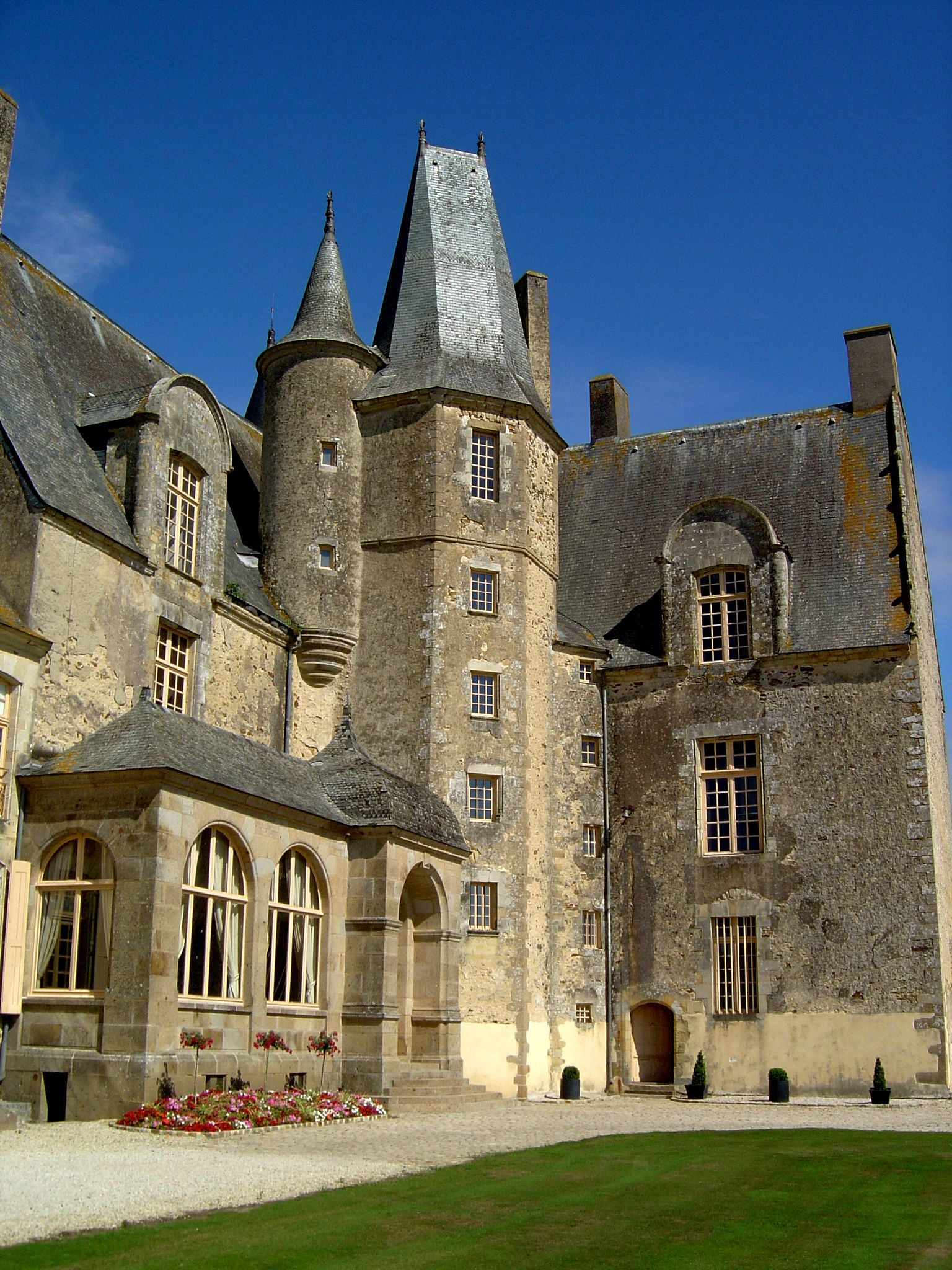
The back of the manor house

The small château was built on a rocky hill – from which it derives its name – by the ancestors of Henri de Sévigné, a Breton nobleman, who married Marie de Rabutin-Chantal in 1644. The residence is built in an L-shaped plan and has two towers. There is also an octagonal chapel, built by Madame de Sévigné in 1671 for her uncle the abbé de Coulanges, known as the Bien-Bon, stables, and outbuildings added in the 18th century. At the back of the garden, a curved wall creates an echo when standing on a slab. Madame de Sévigné used it to read to her daughter.

The French-style garden was created in 1689 and restored in 1982. The whole property is bordered by a wooded park whose alleys were all named by Madame de Sévigné, who stayed at the château des Rochers several times after her husband's death. It was in this residence that she wrote many of her famous letters to her daughter, Françoise de Sévigné, countess of Grignan.

The chapel and a part of the manor, where portraits of the family and some items belonging to the marquise can be found, can be visited. A golf course, a restaurant and reception rooms have been set up on the property.

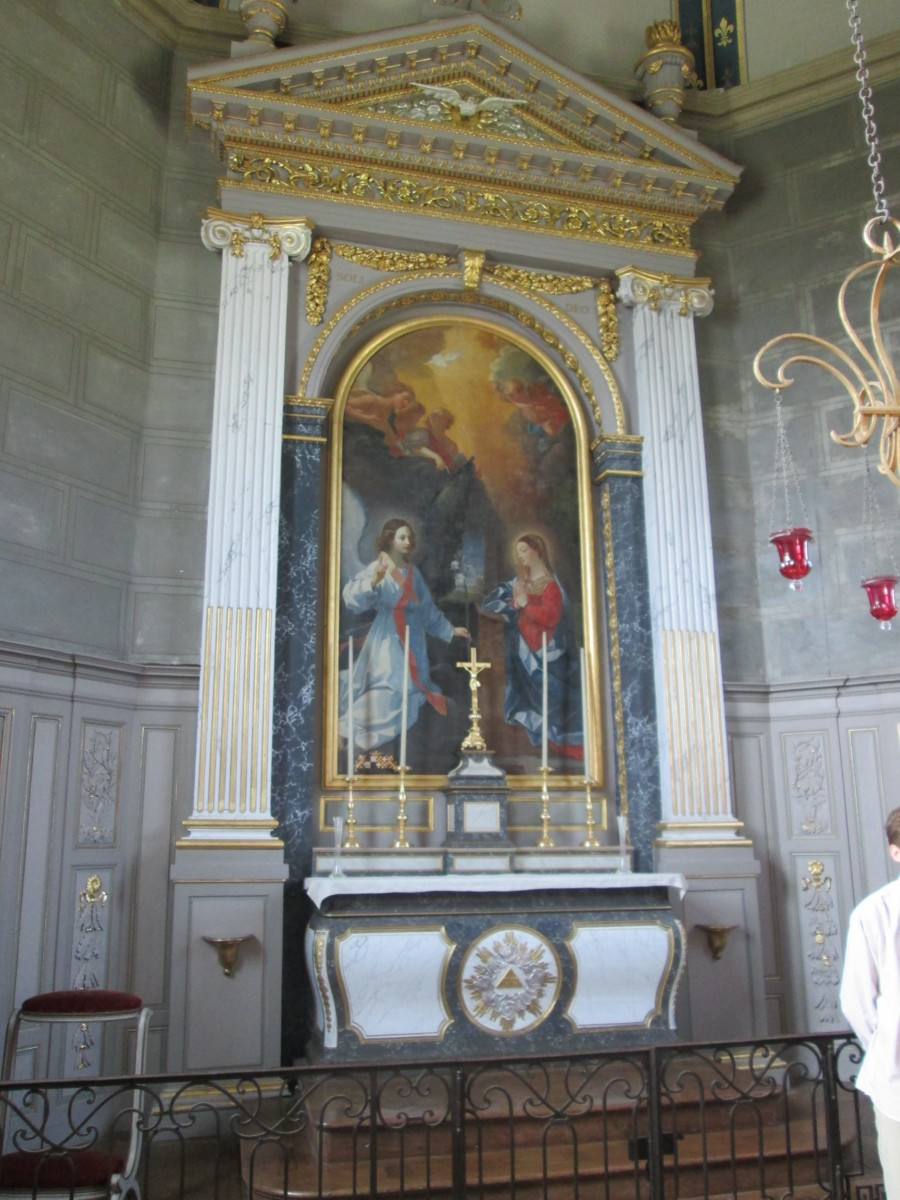
Interior of the chapel.

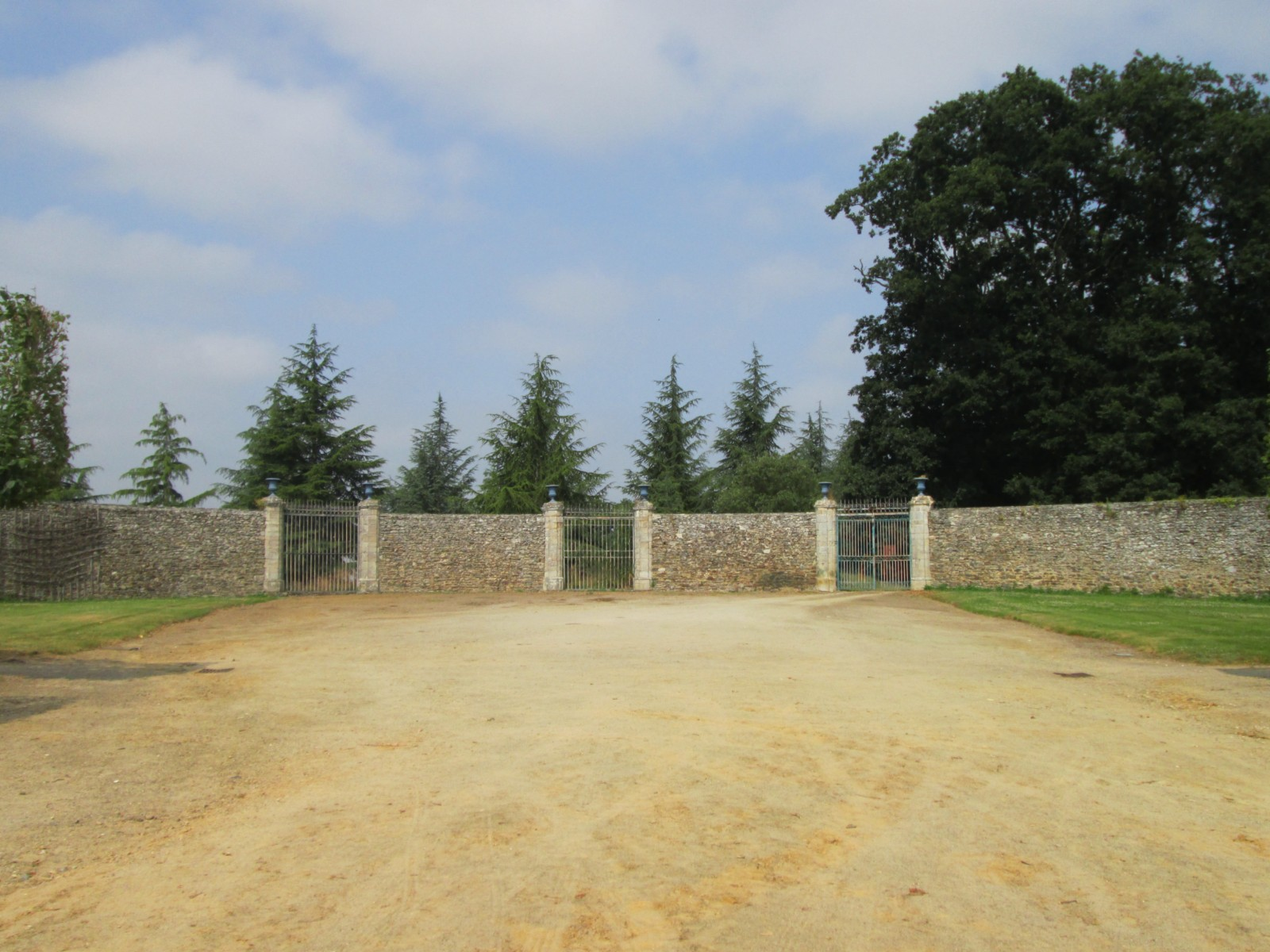
The curved wall shape creates an echo when standing on a slab.

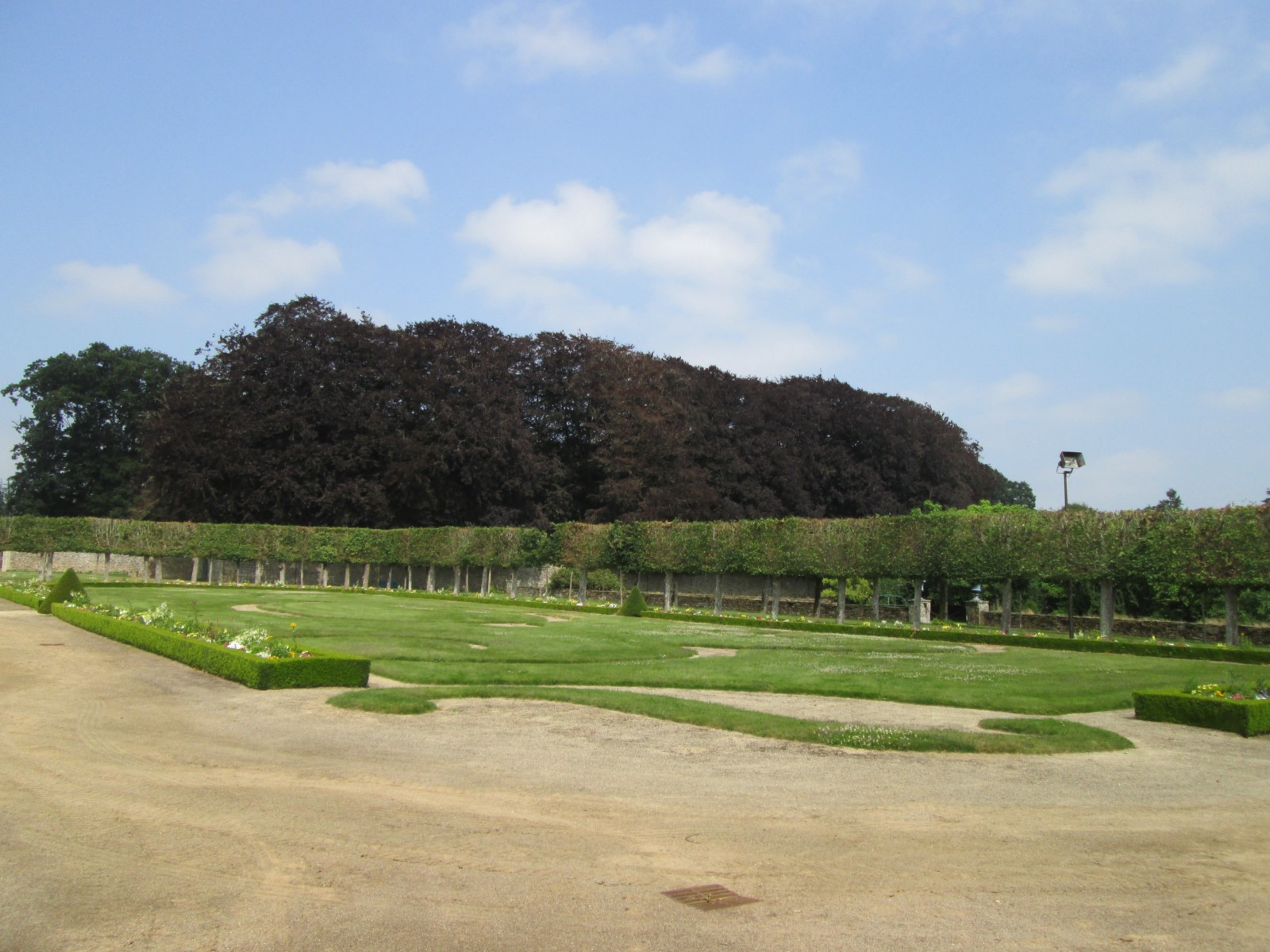
French gardens of the Château des Rochers-Sévigné.

== History ==
The seigneury of Rochers, despite its antiquity, was not a high jurisdiction; it only enjoyed medium and low justice exercised in Vitré in 1667 in the auditorium of the barony of Vitré to which it belonged.

At the beginning of the 17th century, the lord of Rochers also possessed the lordships of La Haye de Torcé, located in the parish of Torcé: this land belonged during the 15th and 16th centuries to the family of Bouschet. La Haye de Torcé, like Rochers, was under the jurisdiction of the barony of Vitré, and the lordship of Le Pin in the parish of Domalain: a fief that came into the hands of the lords of Sévigné through the marriage of one of them with Marguerite du Pouez. It was under the jurisdiction of the châtellenie of Désert united with the barony of Vitré. These two fiefs had high justice.

The lord of Rochers exercised these three jurisdictions together in his auditorium in the town of Étrelles; as the land of Rochers was the most important of the three domains, its owner was naturally, albeit wrongly, considered the high judge lord of Rochers.

=== Mathefelon family, lords of Rochers ===
Even if Jean-Baptiste Ogée in his article on Étrelles indicates that an old castle of Rochers belonged in 1270 to Jamet de Sévigné, lord of Rochers, it is rather likely following Canon Amédée Guillotin de Corson that the Sévigné family did not establish themselves in the Vitré region until the 14th century, following the marriage contracted in 1355 by Guy de Sévigné, lord of the said place, with Agaice Rabaud, heiress of the lordship of Châtelet in Balazé.

The land and fiefs of Rochers then belonged to the lords of Mathefelon, who almost successively (from 1295 to 1370) provided three abbesses to the abbey of Saint-Georges de Rennes.

In 1410, Anne de Mathefelon, daughter and main heiress of Guillaume de Mathefelon, knight, lord of Rochers, married, by contract of March 10, Guillaume III de Sévigné, lord of the said place and of Châtelet; she brought him the lordship of Rochers: during the Reformation made in 1427, in the bishopric of Rennes, by the commissioners Alain Le Jambu and Éon Pofraie, several nobles are mentioned under the title of Notre-Dame de Vitré, including Messire Guillaume de Sévigné, lord of the farm Rochiers (Rochers), du Boullays, de la Ferrière, de la Baillerie, de la Marre, de Clerheult, de la Billonnaye; however, it was Anne de Mathefelon who made her own confession to the baron of Vitré on January 17, 1448.

=== Sévigné family, lords of Rochers ===
From this time and for three consecutive centuries, the lords of Sévigné owned Rochers, and the château remained continuously in the Sévigné family until the 18th century.

Madame de Sévigné's son, Charles de Sévigné, died childless in Paris on March 26, 1713, and was buried in the church of Saint-Jacques du Haut-Pas; his widow survived him until April 29, 1737, and was buried in the cemetery of the same church (Letters from Madame de Sévigné de Sévigné, XII, 22). Upon the death of the Marquis de Sévigné, the seigneurial land of Rochers passed to the niece of Charles de Sévigné, Pauline de Grignan, married in 1695 to Louis III de Simiane, marquis d'Esparron, known as the Marquis de Simiane, gentleman of the Duke of Orléans.

=== Hay family, marquises of Nétumières ===
They sold it, by a contract dated August 4, 1715, to their relative, belonging to a family of Breton parliamentarians related to the Sévigné family, Jean-Paul Hay, marquis of Nétumières, eldest son of Paul Hay, marquis of Nétumières, and Françoise de Bréhant, then heirs of Charles de Sévigné's wife and creditors of the estate; Louis de Simiane himself was born from the marriage of Charles de Simiane with Magdeleine Hay du Châtelet.

The agreed price was 106,000 livres, but the last Marquise de Sévigné, Jeanne-Marguerite de Bréhand-Mauron, widow of Charles de Sévigné, having the right by virtue of the donation of 1688 to half of the property of Rochers, sold this right estimated at 50,000 pounds to her first cousin the baron des Nétumières who only paid for his acquisition accordingly. He had to pay in addition 8,000 pounds "for the furniture furnishing the house of Rochers".

It was the son of Jean-Paul Hay des Nétumières, Charles Paul Hay des Nétumières, and his wife, Marie Rose de Larlan de Kercadio de Rochefort (whose portrait painted in 1750 by Jean-Étienne Liotard is kept at the Detroit Institute of Arts in Michigan, USA), who in the 1740s–1750s acquired the Sévigné hotel in Vitré, thus reuniting these real estate properties owned by the Sévigné family.

The property still belongs to their descendants.

== See also ==
- Château de Vitré
