= Antoine Anselme =

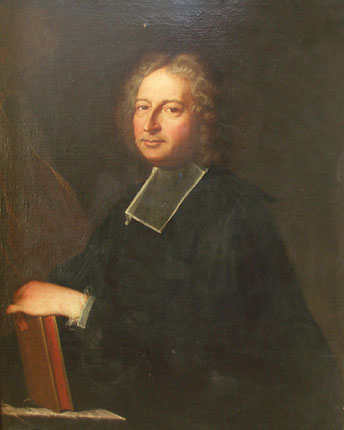
- Portrait of Abbot Anselme by Hyacinthe Rigaud, 1719, Private collection.
- Born: 13 January 1652; L'Isle-Jourdain
- Died: 8 August 1737 (aged 85); Abbey of Saint-Sever
- Other name: The Little Prophet
- Education: Toulouse
- Occupations: Preacher, Writer

Antoine Anselme, born in L'Isle-Jourdain in Armagnac on 13 January 1652 and died in his abbey of Saint-Sever on 8 August 1737, was a widely noted French preacher.

== Biography ==
Early nicknamed "the little prophet" for his gift of repeating to perfection with gestures the sermons he had heard. He studied at Gimont then Toulouse before becoming a priest. He twice won the prize for an Ode from the Academy of Floral Games and gave himself to the ministry of preaching. He began so successfully that he received the nickname of "Little prophet" which he always retained. Noticed by the Marquis de Montespan, who chose him as tutor of his son the Marquis d'Antin, his sermons brought him quickly a solid reputation as a religious speaker in the capital.

In 1681 the French Academy chose him to write the introduction of a panegyric in praise of Saint Louis and thereafter was heard in all the parishes of the capital. Two years later he preached at court: the days of the Last Supper and of Pentecost. In 1698 he preached Advent and Lent. In 1709 he brought his long career to an end. In one of her letters (8 April 1689) Madame de Sevigne noted his intelligence, his eloquence, his charm, and his devotion and said of him: "There is hardly any other preacher that I think I should prefer than him".

A Member of the Academy of Inscriptions in 1710, he died at the Abbey of Saint-Sever that was given to him by Louis XIV in 1699.

His works experienced significant success.

== Writings ==
- Collection of funeral orations pronounced By Sir Anthony Anselm, Abbot of Saint-Sever Cap de Gascogne, Ordinary Preacher to the King in Paris at the house of Louis Josse, 1701: containing the eulogies for Madame de Rohan (Marie-Eleonore de Rohan), The Abbess of Malnoue (Seine-et-Marne), Marie-Thérèse of Austria, Charles de Sainte-Maure – Duke of Montausier, Lord Richard Talbot – Duke of Tyrconnell and Viceroy of Ireland, Anne Marie Louise d'Orléans, Duchess of Montpensier, Gaspard de Fieubet – regular adviser to the king in his Council of State, Chancellor of the Queen...
- Some odes in the Academy of Floral Games of Toulouse
- Panegyrics of Saints and Funeral orations in Paris, 1718, 3 vols. 8°. (Adorned with his portrait by Simonneau)
- Sermons of Advent, Lent and various topics, Paris, 1731, 4 vols. 8°, and Paris. J.-M Gandouin, 1731, 6 vols. 12°.
- Various essays published in the Memoirs of the Academy of Inscriptions between 1724 and 1729.

== Bibliography ==
- Stéphan Perreau, "Rigaud ... particular" in The Stamp – The Object of Art, ed. Faton, Dijon, 2009, ill. p. 65.
- Marie-Nicolas Bouillet and Alexis Chassang (dir.), "Antoine Anselme" in Universal Dictionary of history and geography, 1878 (Wikisource)
- "Sermons chosen from Father Anselme, Soanen, and Guénard by Antoine Anselme, Jean Soanen, and Antoine Guénard" in Library of Christian speakers dedicated to the Children of France, Paris, Brajeux, 1830, XIX.

== Iconography ==
The portrait of Antoine Anselme was painted by Hyacinthe Rigaud around 1719 if the date on the back of the only known copy of the canvas is to be believed.

The work is also known from an engraving by Charles Simonneau dated 1717 according to Hulst who placed the making of the canvas in 1713.
