= François Adhémar de Monteil, Comte de Grignan =

French aristocrat

François Adhémar de Monteil
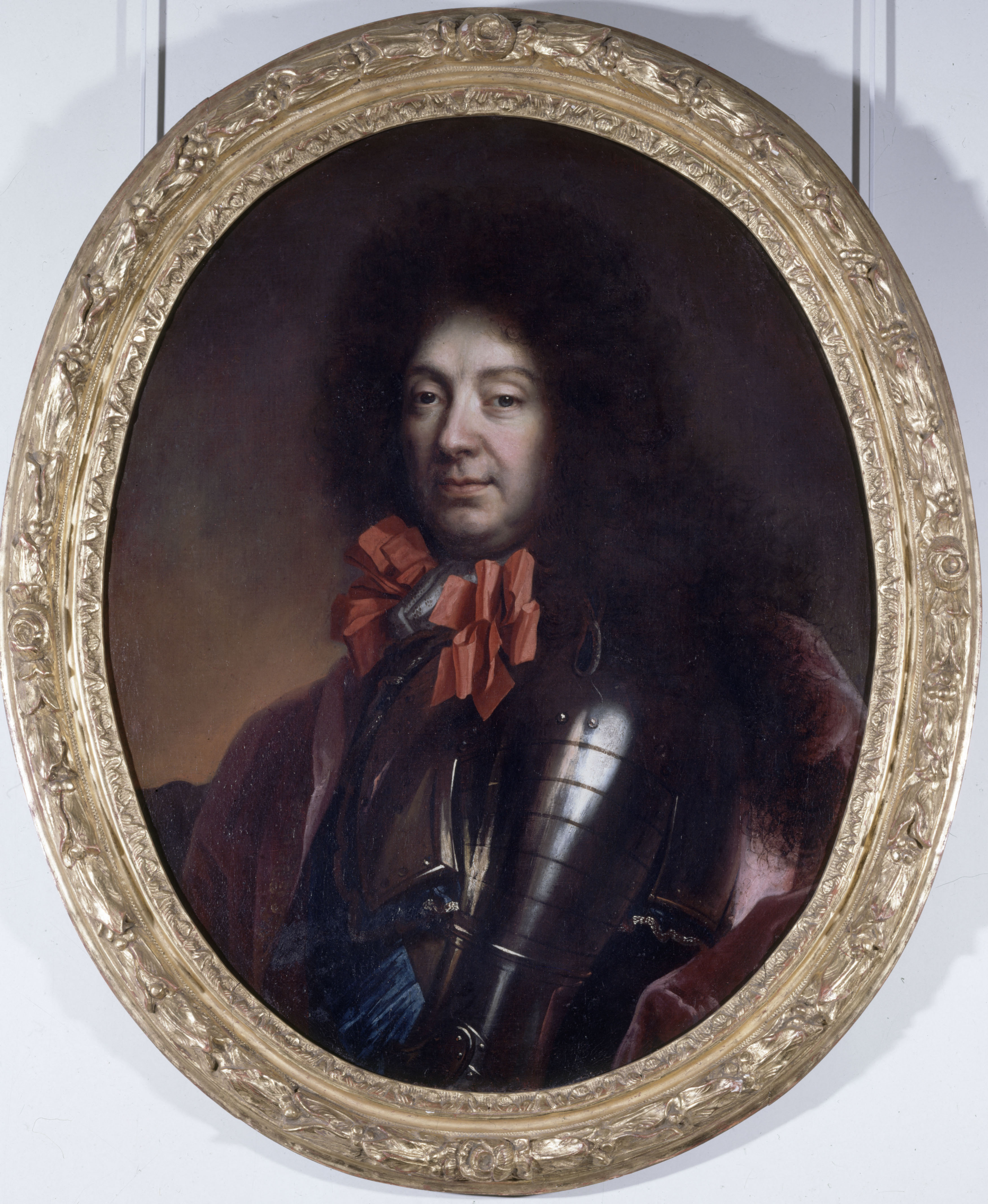
- Portrait by Nicolas de Largillière, c. 1680
- Born: 15 September 1632; Grignan, France
- Died: 30 December 1714 (aged 82); Paris, France
- Title: Count of Grignan, Duke of Termoli, Count of Campobasso, Baron of Entrecasteaux
- Spouses: Angélique-Claire d'Angennes; Marie-Angélique du Puy-du-Fou; Françoise-Marguerite de Sévigné
- Children: six
- Parent(s): Louis Gaucher de Grignan; Marguerite d'Ornano

François Adhémar de Monteil, comte de Grignan (15 September 1632 – 30 December 1714) was a French aristocrat, remembered chiefly for being Lieutenant-Governor of Provence and the beloved son-in-law of Madame de Sévigné.

== Life and career ==
François de Castellane-Ornano-Adhémar de Monteil de Grignan was born in the Provençal village of Grignan in 1632. He was the eldest of 11 children. At the death of his father, on 4 August 1668, he inherited the title of Count of Grignan. While still young, he engaged upon a military career. In 1654, he became colonel of the Champagne Regiment. Two years later, he became Capitaine-Lieutenant of the soldiers of the Household Cavalry of Queen Anne.

He was married three times, first to Angélique-Claire d'Angennes, daughter of Charles d'Angennes, Marquis de Rambouillet. They had two daughters, then Angélique died in 1665. One year later, Grignan married Marie-Angélique du Puy-du-Fou, who died shortly after giving birth to a son, who died in infancy. As a 36-year-old twice-widower, he met and fell in love with the 23-year-old daughter of the illustrious Madame de Sévigné, Françoise-Marguerite de Sévigné.

On 4 December 1668, Madame de Sévigné wrote to her cousin Bussy, “At long last, the prettiest girl in France is marrying – not the prettiest boy – but one of the most honest men in the kingdom: he is Monsieur de Grignan.”

Grignan was indeed remarkably ugly (his ugliness being a frequent family joke) yet tall, graceful, athletic, and charming. He married Mademoiselle de Sévigné in Paris on 27 January 1669. That same year, Louis XIV named Grignan the lieutenant general of the King in Provence. Grignan was thus obliged to leave Paris and return to his family castle in the south of France.

For nearly forty years afterward, he and Madame de Grignan lived an extravagant vice-regal existence in Provence. Every year, he presided at the opening of the Etats at Lambesc, seated on a throne-like chair with the Archbishop of Aix on his right and the Intendant of Provence on his left.

In 1673, Grignan laid siege to the city of Orange, reclaiming the territory for France. Louis XIV upon hearing the news of Grignan's victory, was heard remarking at dinner, "Je suis fort content de Grignan (I am very happy with Grignan)".

Grignan died at the age of 83 at an inn on the road from Lambesc to Marseille. He was buried in Marseille in the Chapelle de Notre-Dame-du-Mont-Carmel.

== Bibliography ==
- Madame de Sévigné. Correspondence. Texte établi, présenté et annoté par Roger Duchêne. Paris: Bibliothèque de la Pléiade. 1973-78. 3 vol..
- Frances Mossiker. Madame de Sevigne: a life and letters. New York: Knopf. 1983. ISBN 0-394-41472-1.
- Fitzgerald, Edward and Mary Eleanor Fitzgerald Kerrich. Dictionary of Madame de Sévigné. New York: Burt Franklin. 1941
- André, Marius. Guide de Grignan: Son Château et ses souvenirs Marseille: 1962.
