= Miss Mousie's Blind Date =

Children's book by Tim Beiser

- Front cover of Miss Mousie's Blind Date
- Author: Tim Beiser
- Illustrator: Rachel Berman
- Language: English
- Genre: Children's literature
- Publisher: Tundra Books
- Publication date: October 2012
- Publication place: Canada
- Media type: Print
- Pages: 24 (first edition)
- ISBN: 978-1-77049-251-6

Miss Mousie's Blind Date is a book by Canadian children's book author Tim Beiser, illustrated by Canadian painter Rachel Berman. It was published by Tundra Books in October 2012.

== Synopsis ==
When Miss Mousie's eyes alight on handsome Matt laBatt, the water rat, in the deli, all she can think about is how to catch his attention. Should she try to speak, bat her eyelashes, drop her hankie? But the water rat breaks the spell by insulting Miss Mousie in front of Mole, the deli-owner. Fleeing home to her burrow in shame, Miss Mousie soon receives an anonymous dinner invitation that sets her life on a whole new course:

"We've never met (at least not yet), but dear, tonight at eight, Would you agree to dine with me? I'll be your mystery date."

== Critical reaction ==
According to critics, "Miss Mousie’s Blind Date is an adorable story of mouse love, with a quirky, dramatic main character that children will find funny. Miss Mousie is clumsy and insecure, but she has a big heart and an even bigger personality. The sentence structure is wonderful with smooth rhymes to be found within the sentences as well as at the end. The story rolls off the tongue, and is not too complex, or too long, to engage a child from start to finish." "Beiser's sprightly text has warmth, heart and a valuable lesson. Berman's pictures, in watercolor and gouache on rag, suggest Beatrix Potter, ably matching the crisp elegance of the story. Wonderful."

== Awards and recognitions ==
- Governor General's Award, Children's Literature Illustration, 2013 (Nominee).
