= Castle of Grignan =

Castle in Auvergne-Rhône-Alpes, France

- Château de Grignan
- Grignan, France
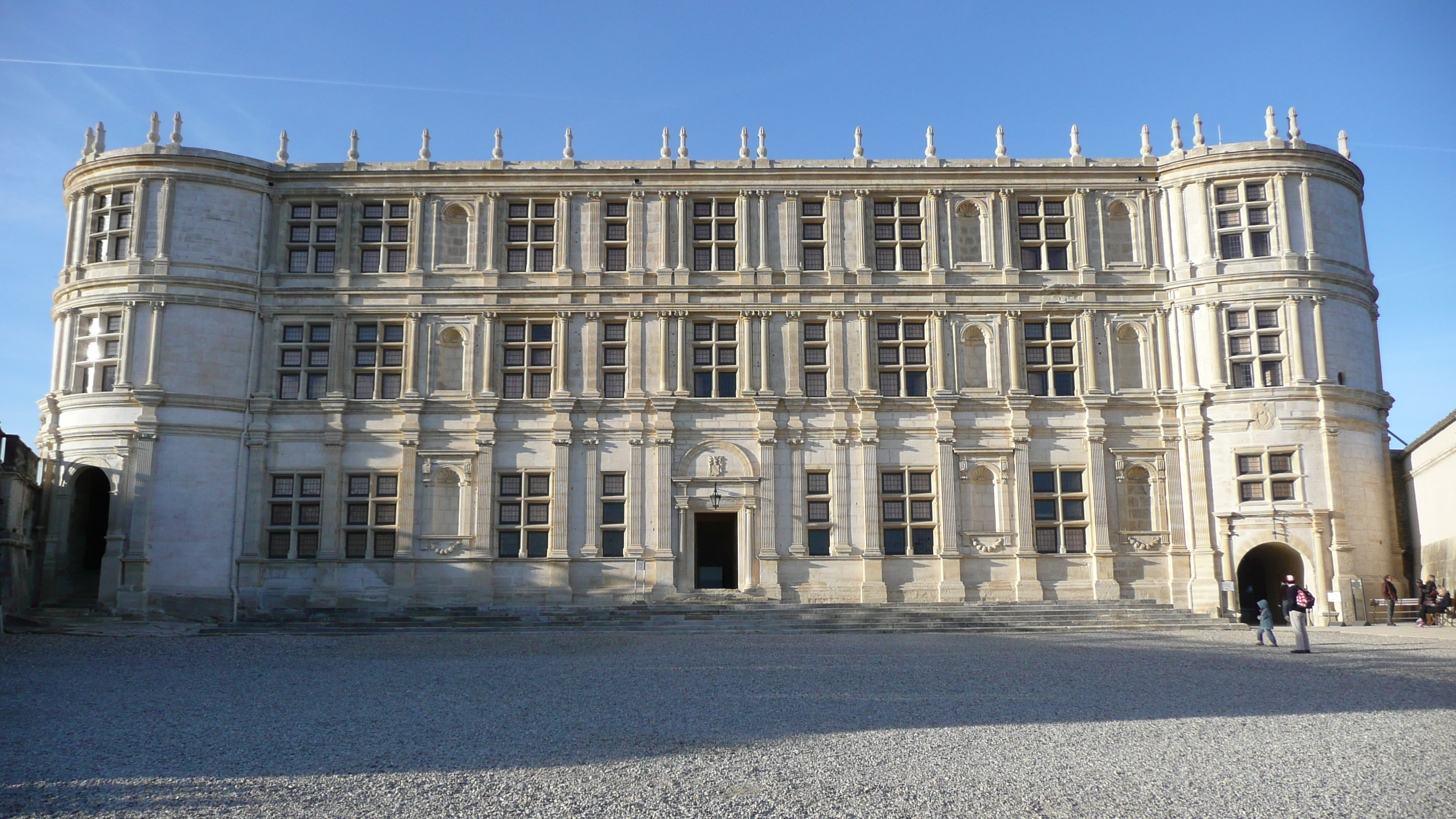

Site information
- Website: http://www.chateaux-ladrome.fr/

The Castle of Grignan (French: Château de Grignan) is a 12th-century castle built on a rocky outcrop overlooking Grignan in Drôme Provençale, transformed into a fortress in the 13th century by the Adhémar family.
