= Morton Beiser =

Canadian psychiatrist

Morton Beiser CM FRCP
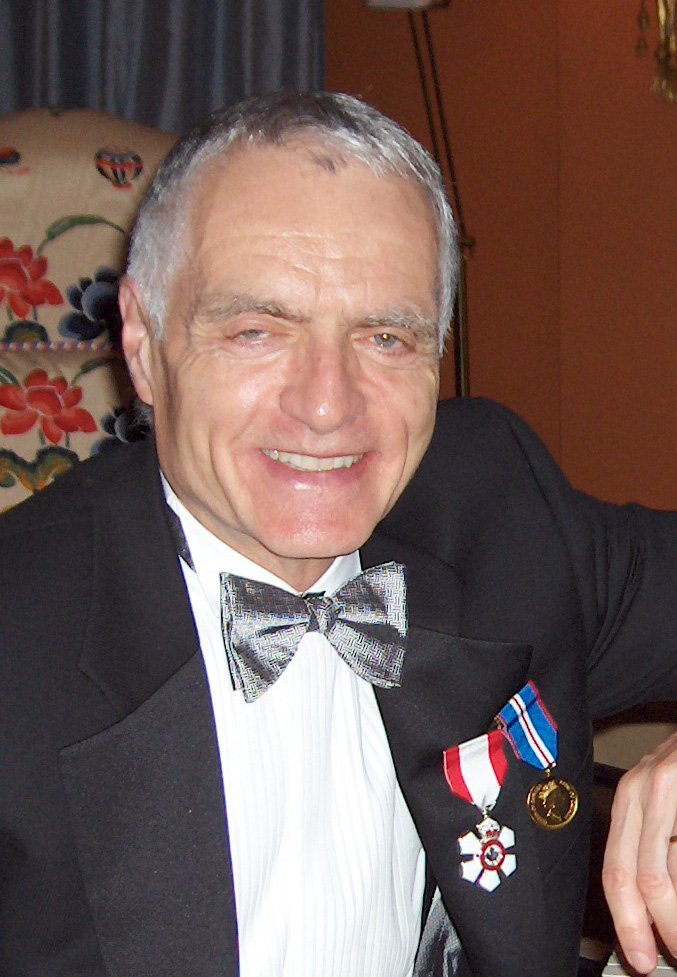
- Morton Beiser in 2004
- Born: November 16, 1936 (age 89); Regina, Saskatchewan, Canada.
- Spouse: J. Timothy Hunt
- Children: 5
- Awards: Order of Canada
- Scientific career
- Fields: Psychiatry, Epidemiology
- Workplaces: Ryerson University, University of Toronto, University of British Columbia, Harvard University,

Morton Beiser (born November 16, 1936) is a Canadian professor, psychiatrist and epidemiologist known for his research in the fields of immigration and resettlement.

He is Professor of Distinction at Toronto Metropolitan University (formerly Ryerson University), Crombie Professor Emeritus of Cultural Pluralism and Health at the University of Toronto, Founding Director and Senior Scientist at the Ontario Metropolis Centre of Excellence for Research on Immigration and Settlement (CERIS), and a Member of the Order of Canada.

== Career history ==
Beiser was born in Regina, Saskatchewan. He graduated from medical school at the University of British Columbia in 1960, with a specialty in psychiatry. At Duke University, he pursued studies in sociology, then studied psychiatric epidemiology at Cornell. In 1971, he was appointed an associate professor at Harvard.

During his time at Harvard he began research on what would become a lifelong fascination with the mental health of immigrants, starting with the health effects of urbanization in Senegal and the mental health of American Indians on reservations.

Beginning in 1975, Beiser was Professor and Head of Social and Cultural Psychiatry at the University of British Columbia's Department of Psychiatry, a position he held for 16 years.

During the 1980s he continued his research as Principal Investigator for the "Refugee Resettlement Project", a ten-year study of the health and experiences of the "Boat People", immigrants from Southeast Asia to Canada. In 1986, he was appointed chair of a federal government task force on the issue, and in 1988 authored the final report of the committee, After the Door Has Been Opened.

In 1991, he joined the University of Toronto where he was David Crombie Professor of Cultural Pluralism and Health, and vice-president for Research, Department of Psychiatry, National Scientific Coordinator, Reducing Health Disparities Initiative, Canadian Institutes of Health Research (2002–2005), and founding director of the Ontario Metropolis Centre of Excellence for Research in Immigration and Settlement (1996–2003).

During his tenure at the University of Toronto, Beiser has received over $17 million in research grants from the Canadian Institutes of Health Research, the United States National Institutes of Health, and other peer-review sources.

He has authored more than 150 scientific research papers, a book about the Boat People entitled Strangers at the Gate, and is co-editor of the forthcoming Immigration, Ethnicity, and Health. He also conceived and produced a radio program on immigration in Canada which was aired from 1999 to 2000 in Ontario and Alberta, as well as a version for Canadian students, Strangers Becoming Us, to be used in the classroom, seeking to move his research from the realm of scientific research to policy debate. Strangers Becoming Us is still in use in all public elementary and high schools in Canada.

Beiser, now retired, was Professor of Distinction at Toronto Metropolitan University.

== Books ==
- Today's Priorities in Mental Health: Knowing and Doing, 1978, co-editor with Robert Krell, Tsung-yi Lin, and Milton H. Miller.
- Strangers at the Gate, 1999

== Personal life ==
He lives in Toronto, Ontario, Canada, and in Grignan, France, with his husband, author J. Timothy Hunt. He has five sons: David Beiser, director of the International Grants Program, AYUSA Global Youth Exchange; award-winning journalist Vince Beiser; film and television actor Brendan Beiser and twins Daniel and Rowan Beiser. He is the cousin of computer science author Boris Beizer.

== Awards, recognition, and residencies ==
- National Health Scholar and Scientist Awards, Canada's National Health Research and Development Program (1981–1999)
- Honorary Member, Belgian Royal Society of Medicine (1975)
- Distinguished Scholar Award, Josiah Macy, Jr. Foundation (1974–1975)
- University of Toronto Beverley Distinguished Professor Award (1988)
- Joey and Tobey Tanenbaum Research Award (1994)
- Rockefeller Foundation Resident Scholar Award (1995)
- Canadian Psychiatric Association Award for Research in Psychiatric Epidemiology (2002)
- Queen's Golden Jubilee medal (2002)
- Member of the Order of Canada (2004)
- Queen's Diamond Jubilee medal (2012)
