= Bradley McGogg, the Very Fine Frog =

Children's book by Tim Beiser

- Author: Tim Beiser
- Illustrator: Rachel Berman
- Language: English
- Genre: Children's literature
- Publisher: Tundra Books
- Publication date: March 2009
- Publication place: Canada
- Media type: Print
- Pages: 26 (first edition)
- ISBN: 978-0-88776-864-4
- OCLC: 222517447

Bradley McGogg, the Very Fine Frog is a book by Canadian children's book author Tim Beiser, illustrated by Canadian painter Rachel Berman. It was published by Tundra Books in March 2009.

== Synopsis ==
Bradley McGogg makes his home in the bog where there are plenty of yummy bugs for a frog to feed on. Upon finding his pantry bare one day, Bradley decides to meet his neighbors, in the hopes that they will share some of their favorite meals with him. But this "bog frog" soon finds that not all animals eat alike.

== Reception ==
According to CM Magazine, "The rhythm, rhyme, and vivid descriptions make the story come to life." and it "uses magical images to illuminate the text and to engage readers in the story in wonderful ways! ... The paintings provide readers with a feast for the eyes and the imagination!.", while Canadian Children's Book News wrote "Rhyming stories are notoriously difficult to write, but here the scansion works and the rhyme (both internal and end rhymes) makes the story a delight to read out loud." Quill & Quire stated "Tim Beiser does a bang-up job, using all the tricks of the trade, such as enjambment, sound echoes, and internal rhyme ... The rhyming verse is so fresh and the illustrations so full of personality and emotion that we quickly forget the slight premise and simply enjoy Brad's neighbourhood kitchen crawl."

== Awards and recognition ==
- Governor General's Award, Children's Literature Illustration, 2009 (Nominee)
- Canadian Booksellers Association Libris Award 2010—Children's Picture Book of the Year (Nominee)
- Ontario Library Association's 2010 Forest of Reading, Blue Spruce Award (Nominee)
- Canadian Toy Testing Council, Top 10 Books of the year 2010.
- Chocolate Lily Book Awards 2010-2011, Picture book (Nominee)
