= Charles de Sévigné =

French Baron (1648–1713)

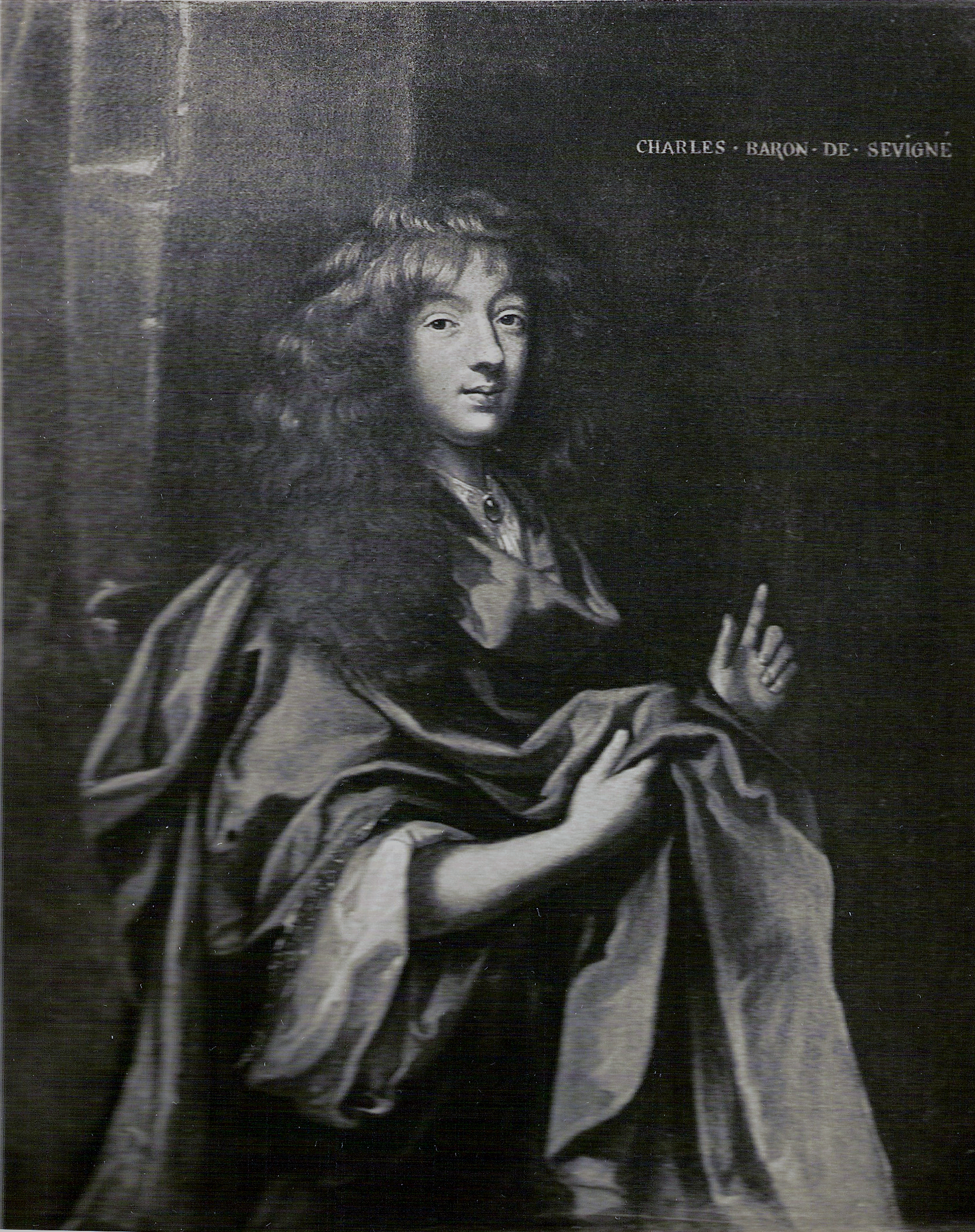
- Born: 12 March 1648; Vitré, Ille-et-Vilaine, France
- Died: 26 March 1713 (aged 65); Paris, France
- Spouse: Jeanne Marguerite de Mauron
- Parent(s): Henri de Sévigné; Marie de Rabutin-Chantal

Charles de Sévigné (1648–1713) was a French aristocrat and soldier. He was the son of French literary icon Madame de Sévigné.

== Life ==
Charles was born at the family's Château des Rochers-Sévigné (now a part of Vitré, Ille-et-Vilaine) in Brittany on March 12, 1648. He was the second child of Henri de Sévigné and his young wife, Marie de Rabutin-Chantal. Their other child, Françoise-Marguerite de Sévigné (the future Madame de Grignan), was born two years prior in Paris.

In 1651, Henri was killed in a duel over his mistress, Madame de Gondran. Now a widow, Madame de Sévigné took her children back to Paris where they came to live with her uncle, l'abbé de Coulanges, in the Marais district.

Nothing is known of Charles's education. Since his letters show him to be erudite, it is assumed that Madame de Sévigné provided him with the best tutors available. No mention of Charles can be found in anyone's correspondence until he was well into his twenties. In his mother's letters to her daughter and others, Charles was characterized as an intellectual, a spendthrift and a hedonist. He was also regarded to be sweet-natured, warm, and likeable — very much like his mother, Madame de Sévigné. Oddly enough, he never appeared to resent his mother's obvious preference for his sister.

In 1669, Charles volunteered for an expedition to Crete against the Ottoman Turks. The following year, his mother bought him the commission of guidon (a kind of sub-cornet) in the Gendarmes Dauphin, in which regiment he served for some years. He fought well and with distinction, but was not an enthusiastic soldier.

He was constantly and often unfortunately in love. He followed his father into the arms of Ninon de l'Enclos, and he was Racine's rival with Mademoiselle de Champmeslé. He confided many graphic details of his misalliances in letters to his mother.

Charles was married in February 1684 to Jeanne Marguerite de Mauron, daughter of a counsellor in the Parlement of Brittany. In the arrangements for this marriage, Madame de Sévigné practically divided all her fortune between her children, and she reserved only part of the life interest.

In 1703, Charles gave up his post of King's Lieutenant in Brittany. Accompanied by his wife, he took up residence in Paris at the Faubourg Saint-Jacques. His final years were spent in a seminarian's cell at Saint-Magloire Seminary, a community of the devout. He died on 26 March 1713 at the age of 65.

Charles and Jeanne Marguerite had no children. He bequeathed his entire estate to his niece Pauline de Simiane.

== Bibliography ==
- Madame de Sévigné. Correspondance. Texte établi, présenté et annoté par Roger Duchêne. Paris: Bibliothèque de la Pléiade. 1973-78. 3 vol..
- Frances Mossiker. Madame de Sevigne: a life and letters. New York: Knopf. 1983. ISBN 0-394-41472-1.
