= The Politics of Bones =

2005 book by J. Timothy Hunt

The Politics of Bones: Dr. Owens Wiwa and the Struggle for Nigeria's Oil
- Front cover of The Politics of Bones
- Author: J. Timothy Hunt
- Language: English
- Subject: anti-globalization, petroleum, Nigeria
- Publisher: McClelland & Stewart
- Publication date: September 2005
- Publication place: Canada
- Media type: Print (hardcover & paperback)
- Pages: 400 (first edition)
- ISBN: 0-7710-4154-3 (hardcover); ISBN 0-7710-4158-6(paperback)

The Politics of Bones: Dr. Owens Wiwa and the Struggle for Nigeria's Oil is a book by Canadian journalist J. Timothy Hunt. It was published by McClelland & Stewart in September 2005 just before the tenth anniversary of the controversial execution of Ken Saro-Wiwa.

On November 10, 1995, Nigeria’s military dictatorship executed nine environmental activists. Among them was Ken Saro-Wiwa, the charismatic spokesman of the Ogoni people, whose land in the fertile Niger River delta has been grotesquely polluted by the Royal Dutch Shell Corporation. During Ken's incarceration, his brother, Dr. Owens Wiwa, fought valiantly to save his life. When his quest failed, Owens narrowly escaped Nigeria with his life, first to London, and then to Toronto.

The Politics of Bones documents Owens's personal battle against the Nigerian government to locate his brother's remains after they were buried in an unmarked mass-grave. Over the torturous course of ten years, Owens finally succeeded in locating and properly burying his brother in the summer of 2005.

== See also ==
- J. Timothy Hunt
- History of Nigeria
