= Françoise-Marguerite de Sévigné =

French aristocrat (1646–1705)

Françoise-Marguerite de Sévigné, comtesse de Grignan
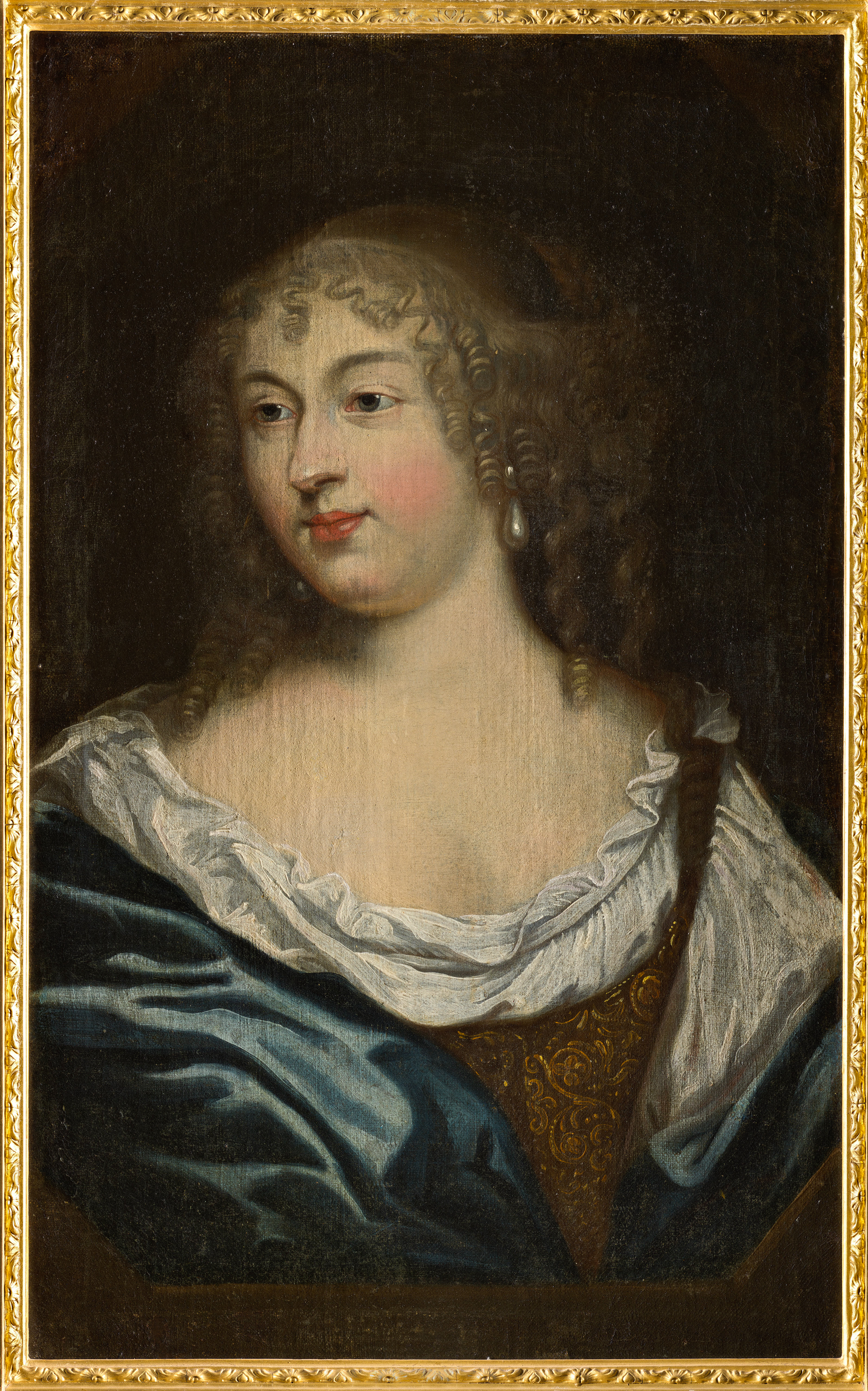
- Portrait of the Countess of Grignan, after Louis Elle
- Born: 10 October 1646; Paris, France
- Died: 13 August 1705 (aged 58); Marseille, France
- Spouse: François Adhémar de Monteil, comte de Grignan
- Children: Marie-Blanche de Grignan; Pauline de Simiane
- Parent(s): Henri de Sévigné; Marie de Rabutin-Chantal

Françoise-Marguerite de Sévigné, comtesse de Grignan (10 October 1646 – 13 August 1705), was a French aristocrat, remembered for the letters that her mother, Madame de Sévigné, wrote to her.

== Life ==
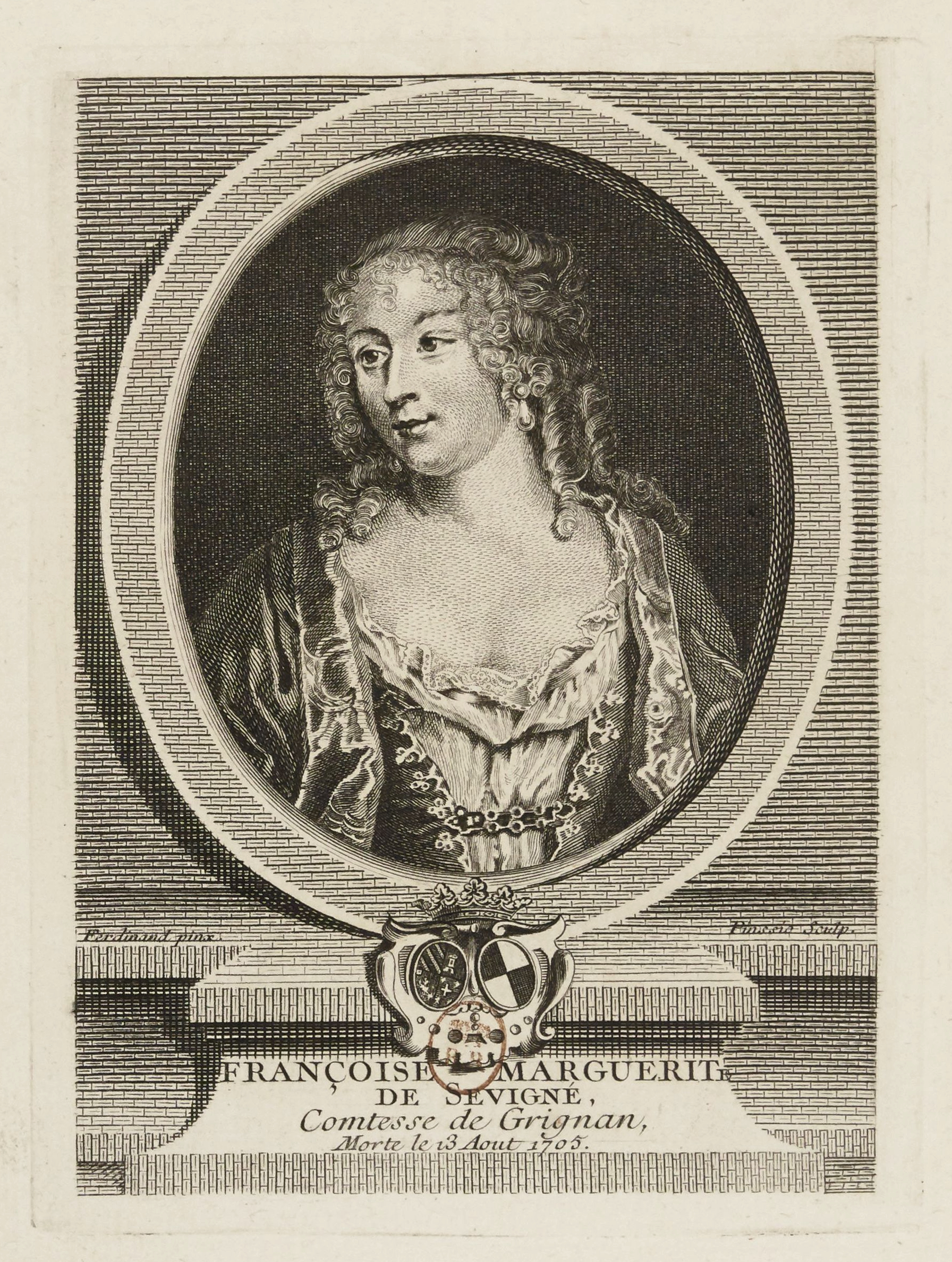
Madame de Grignan, engraved portrait

Françoise-Marguerite was born in Paris, France, on 10 October 1646, in the fashionable Place des Vosges. She was the first child of Henri de Sévigné and his young wife, Marie de Rabutin-Chantal. Two years later, at the family's Château des Rochers-Sévigné in Brittany, her brother, Charles de Sévigné, was born. In 1651, Henri was killed in a duel over his mistress, Madame de Gondran. Now a widow, the Marquise de Sévigné took her children back to Paris where they came to live with her uncle, l'abbé de Coulanges, in the Marais district.

After her mother became well-established in the royal court of Louis XIV, 17-year-old Françoise-Marguerite made her court debut in the Royal Ballets des Arts, dancing a lead role as a shepherdess alongside Louis, himself, as a shepherd. She was a sensation. Isaac de Benserade referred to Mademoiselle de Sévigné as "A dazzling young beauty". The Marquis de Tréville wrote that she was "a beauty to set the world afire".

The next year, the King's brother, "Monsieur" (Philippe de France, duc d'Orléans), invited her to dance with him in a ballet at the Palais-Royal (he as a water god, she as a nymph). In 1665, she danced again with the King in a ballet entitled The Birth of Venus, in which he portrayed Alexander and Mademoiselle de Sévigné Omphale. At a July 1668 supper, both Madame de Sévigné and her daughter were seated at the King's table. As the King was at that time between love affairs, it was widely speculated that Françoise-Marguerite would be his next mistress. The "honor" of royal mistress, however, fell upon the brilliant Madame de Montespan and the King's attentions drifted away from Mademoiselle de Sévigné.

Despite Françoise-Marguerite's sharp wit and renowned beauty, she was widely considered to be vain and cold. Her mother's cousin Roger de Bussy-Rabutin described her thus: "She has a keen mind, but it is a bitter sort of intelligence. She is unbearably vain, which will lead her to all sorts of stupid blunders. She will make as many enemies as her mother had made friends and admirers."

Matrimonial prospects presented themselves, but it is likely she repulsed all advances. In a madrigal, Denis Sanguin de Saint-Pavin made light of the situation: "And so the world is just too small / To find in it anyone at all / Who could be deemed worthy of her. / And the belle, knowing it well, / Disdains all, finds none acceptable."

When Françoise-Marguerite reached the relatively advanced age of 23 without a husband, her mother began to despair of ever marrying off her daughter. However, on 4 December 1668, Madame de Sévigné wrote to her cousin Bussy, "At long last, the prettiest girl in France is marrying – not the prettiest boy – but one of the most honest men in the kingdom: he is Monsieur de Grignan".

François Adhémar de Monteil, comte de Grignan, 36 years old and twice a widower, from a Provençal family, was ugly (his ugliness being a frequent family joke), yet tall, graceful, athletic, and charming. By all indications, he and Mademoiselle de Sévigné had fallen in love. They married in Paris on 27 January 1669.

That same year, Louis XIV named Monsieur de Grignan the lieutenant general of the King in Provence. Grignan was thus obliged to leave Paris and return to his family castle in the south of France. Madame de Grignan, having become pregnant shortly after the wedding, was convinced by her mother to remain in Paris for the birth of her child. A daughter, Marie-Blanche was born in 1670.

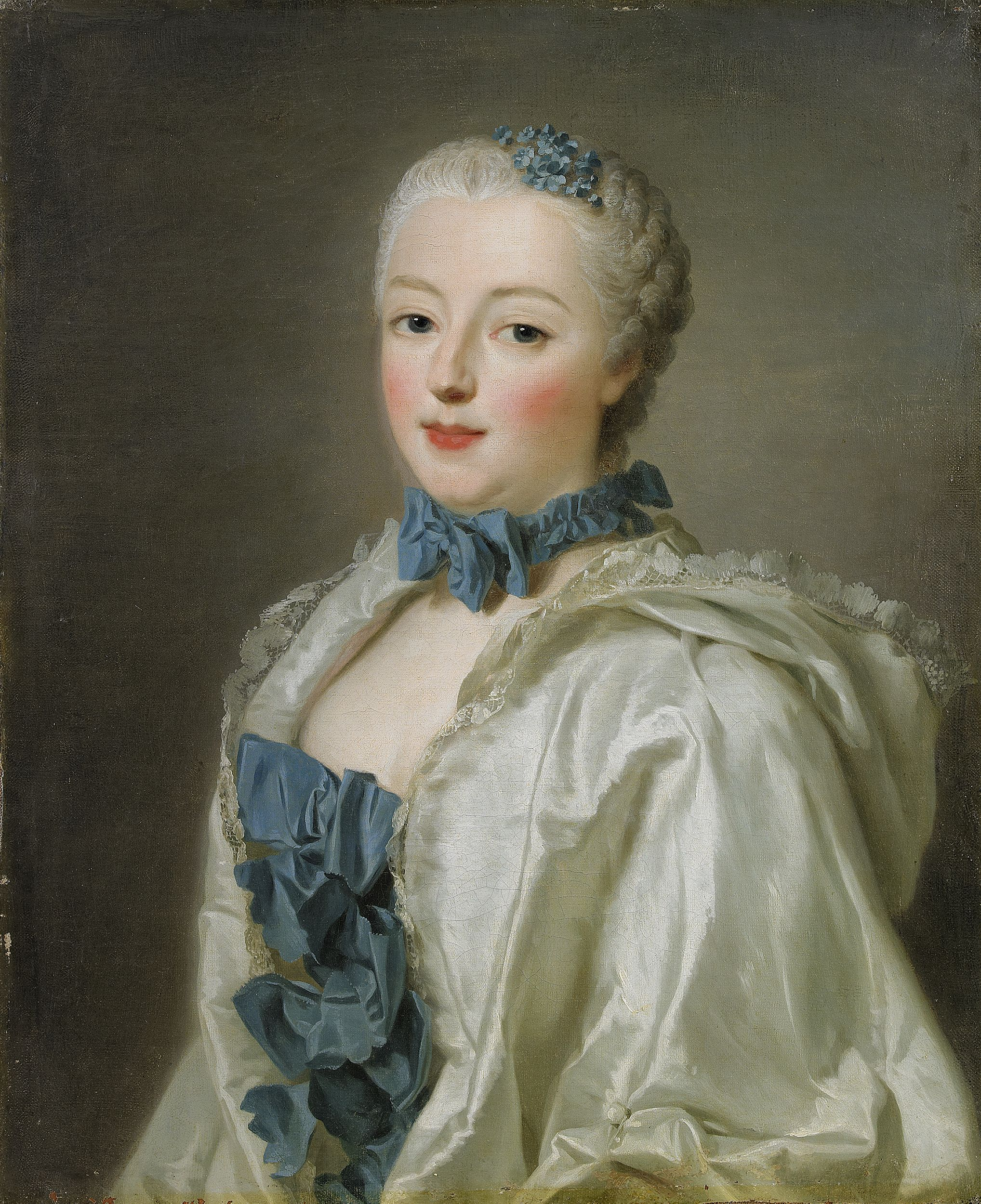
So-called portrait of Francoise-Marguerite de Sevigne by Alexander Roslin

On 4 February 1671, Madame de Grignan left Paris to join her husband in Provence (the baby girl being shipped off to a convent for life.) The separation from Françoise-Marguerite left Madame de Sévigné bereft. "I look in vain for my daughter; I no longer see her, and every step she takes increases the distance between us. (I am) still weeping, still swooning with grief," she wrote to Françoise-Marguerite only hours after her departure.

Thus began their correspondence. Over the span of nearly 30 years, Madame de Sévigné sent well over 1,000 letters to her daughter in the far-away Chateau de Grignan, often composing them at the rate of 20 pages a day.

== Bibliography ==
- Madame de Sévigné. Correspondance. Texte établi, présenté et annoté par Roger Duchêne. Paris: Bibliothèque de la Pléiade. 1973–78. 3 vol..
- Frances Mossiker. Madame de Sevigne: a life and letters. New York: Knopf. 1983. ISBN 0-394-41472-1.
- Roger de Bussy-Rabutin. Correspondance de Roger de Rabutin, comte de Bussy, avec sa famille et ses amis, 1666–1693
