= Vince Beiser =

American-Canadian journalist

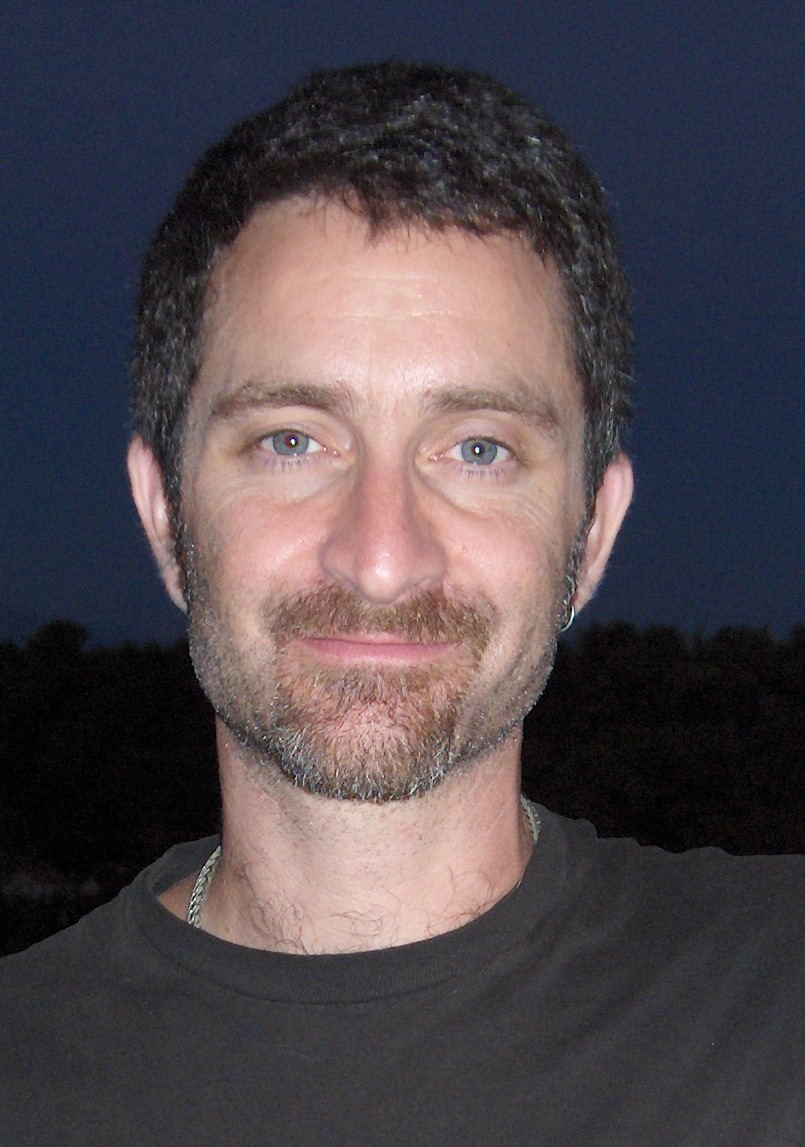
- Beiser in 2005
- Born: July 13, 1965 (age 61); New York City, United States
- Occupation: Journalist
- Writing career
- Genre: Criminal justice
- Website: www.vincebeiser.com

Vince L. Beiser (born July 13, 1965) is an American-Canadian journalist.

== Biography ==
Beiser was born in New York City, United States to Morton Beiser (Order of Canada) and Roberta Lando Beiser (Commemorative Medal for the Queen's Golden Jubilee and Government of Canada Celebration ’88 Certificate of Merit winner). He is the brother of actor Brendan Beiser and of David Beiser, of AYUSA Global Youth Exchange.

Beiser lives in Vancouver, Canada, with his wife and children.

== Career overview ==
He studied at the University of California at Berkeley, graduating with highest honors (Summa cum Laude) with a degree in Middle Eastern Studies.

As a Los Angeles-based freelance journalist specializing in criminal justice and other social issues, he was a special projects reporter for The Oakland Tribune, and a senior writer for The Jerusalem Report, Israel's leading news magazine. For publications such as Harper's, Wired, The Los Angeles Times Magazine, The Village Voice, The New Republic, The Nation, and Rolling Stone he has reported from as far away as the Balkans, the Middle East and India.

He is an online contributor to The Huffington Post. He is also the former senior editor of Mother Jones.

For his frequent reporting on capital punishment and death-row issues, Beiser is a regular guest on the BBC, NPR and other radio talk shows.

Beiser appeared at TED talks in July 2019 and his presentation was titled "There's a global sand crisis and no one is talking about it."

== Achievements and honours ==
Beiser's work has been honored by Investigative Reporters and Editors, the Columbia, Medill, and Missouri Graduate Schools of Journalism, the National Mental Health Association, the Association of Alternative Newsweeklies and other institutions.

In 2025 he won the Balsillie Prize for Public Policy for his book Power Metal: The Race for the Resources That Will Shape the Future.

== Works ==
- The World in a Grain: The Story of Sand and How It Transformed Civilization, Riverhead Books, New York, 2018, ISBN 9780399576423
- Power Metal: The Race for the Resources That Will Shape the Future, Riverhead Books, New York, 2024, ISBN 9780593541708
