= Brendan Beiser =

Canadian actor

- Born: Brendan Joseph Beiser; April 17, 1970 (age 56); Boston, Massachusetts, U.S.
- Occupation: Actor
- Years active: 1994-present

Brendan Joseph Beiser (born April 17, 1970) is a Canadian actor best known for his performance as Agent Pendrell in the science fiction television show The X-Files.

== Personal life ==
Beiser was born in Boston. He is the son of Order of Canada recipient, professor Morton Beiser, and Canadian socialite Roberta Lando Beiser, brother to journalist Vince Beiser, and is related to actor Peter Lando as well as horror film director Jeffrey Lando. Beiser moved from Boston to France at age six, and then to Vancouver at age seven. He studied theatre at Concordia University in Montreal, and later attended the William Davis Centre for Actors' Study in Vancouver, where he studied under William B. Davis and Mark Bauer.

Brendan lives in Vancouver.

== Career ==
Beiser is primarily a comedic actor, appearing in sketch-comedy productions like Aardvark (1994) and taking comic roles in feature films Something Beneath and TV such as Night Man, The Fear: Resurrection (1999), Ice Angel (2000), and Wolf Canyon. He has also voiced the character of Quincy in Mary-Kate and Ashley Olsen's animated series Mary-Kate and Ashley in Action!

Along with best friend Trevor White, Beiser co-starred in a stage play and short film called Aardvark! which he wrote and directed for the 1997 Canadian Fringe Festival. He also directed the short film --Er, chronicling his attempt to produce a film starring his family for a festival competition, which won the ZeD People's Choice Award at the 2003 ReelFast 48 Hour Film Festival. Beiser and White also have their own production company, called Duck, a Whale.

More recently Beiser has become the face of LifeWise Health Plan of Oregon's "boringly good" campaign.
