= Boris Beizer =

American software engineer and author (1934–2018)

- Born: 25 June 1934; Brussels, Belgium.
- Died: 7 October 2018 (aged 84)
- Education: City College of New York; University of Pennsylvania
- Scientific career
- Fields: Software testing

Boris Beizer (June 25, 1934 – October 7, 2018) was a Belgian-American software engineer and author. He received his B.S. degree in physics from the City College of New York in 1956, an MS in Electrical Engineering (1963) and a PhD in computer science from the University of Pennsylvania in 1966. He wrote many books and articles on topics such as system architecture and software testing. His books Software Testing Techniques and Software System Testing and Quality Assurance are frequently consulted references on the subject. He directed testing for the FAA's Weather Message Switching Center and several other large communications systems. He was a speaker at many testing conferences and was also known for his seminars on testing. He consulted on software testing and quality assurance with many organizations throughout the world.

== Personal life ==
Boris Beizer was born in Brussels, Belgium. He emigrated to the United States in May, 1941.

== List of publications (partial) ==
- Software Quality Reflections Essays, dialogues and poems, 2000
- Black-box testing: techniques for functional testing of software and systems (1995) ISBN 0-471-12094-4; Japanese edition, Nikei
- The frozen keyboard: living with bad software (1988) ISBN 0-8306-3146-1
- Personal computer quality: a guide for victims and vendors (1986) ISBN 0-442-20992-4
- Software system testing and quality assurance (1984) ISBN 0-44221-306-9
- Software testing techniques (1983) ISBN 0-442-20672-0; expanded Second edition 1990; Japanese Edition Nikei
- Micro-analysis of computer system performance (1978) ISBN 0-442-20663-1; Russian Edition
- Communications Processor System (1977) with Kenneth Hagstrom
- The architecture and engineering of digital computer complexes, Volume 1 (1971), Volume 2; Polish and Russian Editions
- Engineering applications of Boolean algebra (1958) with Stephen W. Leibholz

Novels under pseudonym Ethan I. Shedley

- Earth Ship and Star Song. Viking. 1979. ISBN 0670287202.
- The Medusa Conspiracy. Viking. 1980. ISBN 0670465712.
