= Grignan =

- Commune
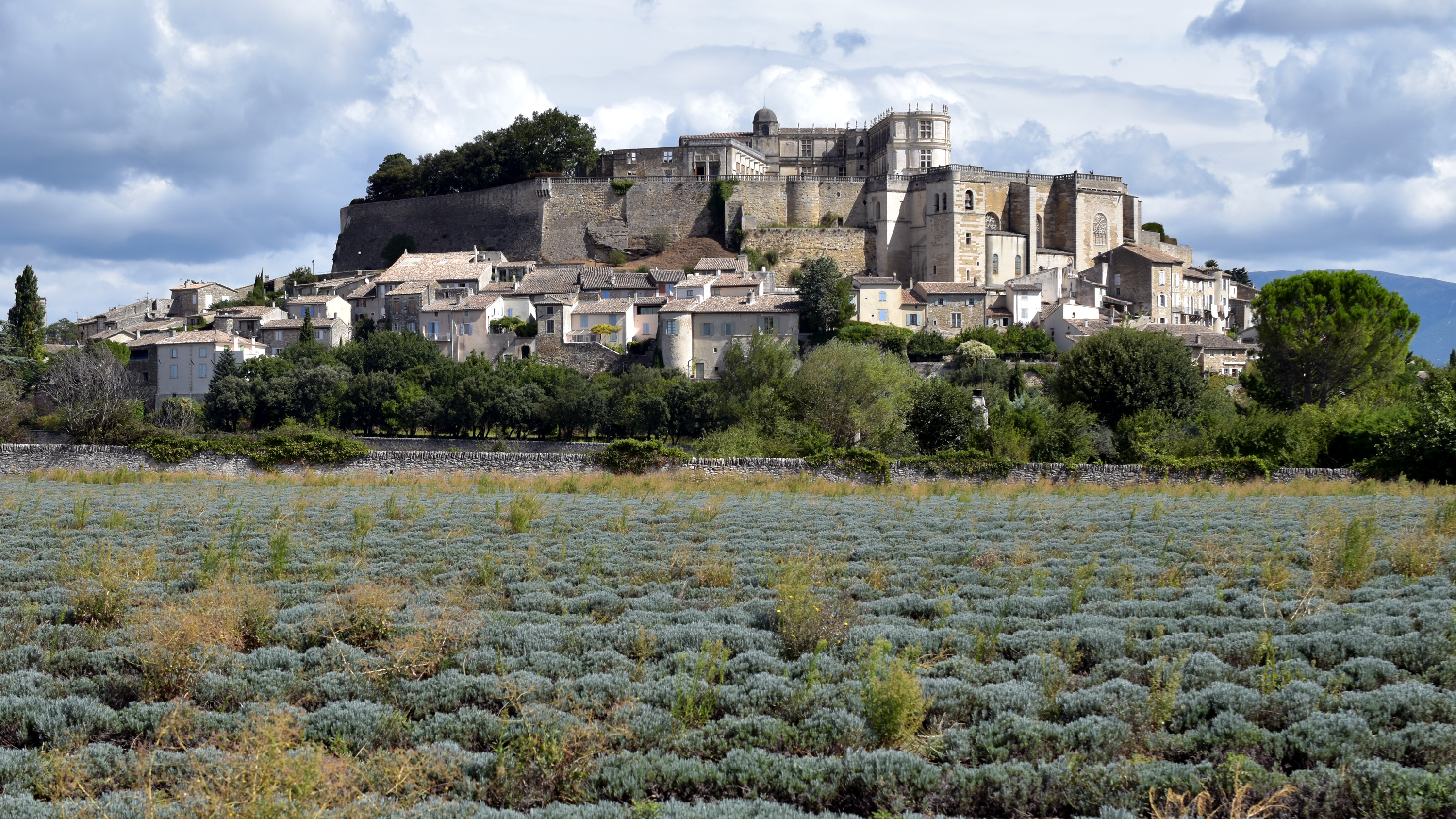
- View of Grignan and its castle, with a lavender field in the foreground

- Coat of arms
- Location of Grignan
- Location within France Location within Auvergne-Rhône-Alpes
- Coordinates: 44°25′13″N 4°54′32″E
- Country: France
- Region: Auvergne-Rhône-Alpes
- Department: Drôme
- Arrondissement: Nyons
- Canton: Grignan

Government
  - Mayor (2020–2026): Bruno Durieux
- Area^{1}: 43.43 km^{2} (16.77 sq mi)
- Elevation: 198 m (650 ft)
- Highest elevation: 471 m (1,545 ft)
- Lowest elevation: 130 m (430 ft)
- Population (2023): 1,596
  - Density: 36.75/km^{2} (95.18/sq mi)
- Time zone: UTC+01:00 (CET)
  - Summer (DST): UTC+02:00 (CEST)
- INSEE/Postal code: 26146 /26230
- ^{1} French Land Register data, which excludes lakes, ponds, glaciers > 1 km^{2} (0.386 sq mi or 247 acres) and river estuaries.

Grignan (French pronunciation: [ɡʁiɲɑ̃]; Occitan: Grinhan) is a commune in the Drôme department in the Auvergne-Rhône-Alpes region in southeastern France. It is a member of Les Plus Beaux Villages de France (The Most Beautiful Villages of France) Association.

It has a Renaissance castle and is mentioned in the letters that Madame de Sévigné wrote to her daughter, Madame de Grignan, in the 17th century.

== Geography ==
Grignan is located in the south of the Drôme department, near the border of the neighbouring Vaucluse department, and close to Mont Ventoux, the highest mountain in Provence.

To visit Grignan, take the A7 autoroute and use either exit #18, Montélimar Sud, or #19, Bollène.

=== Agriculture ===
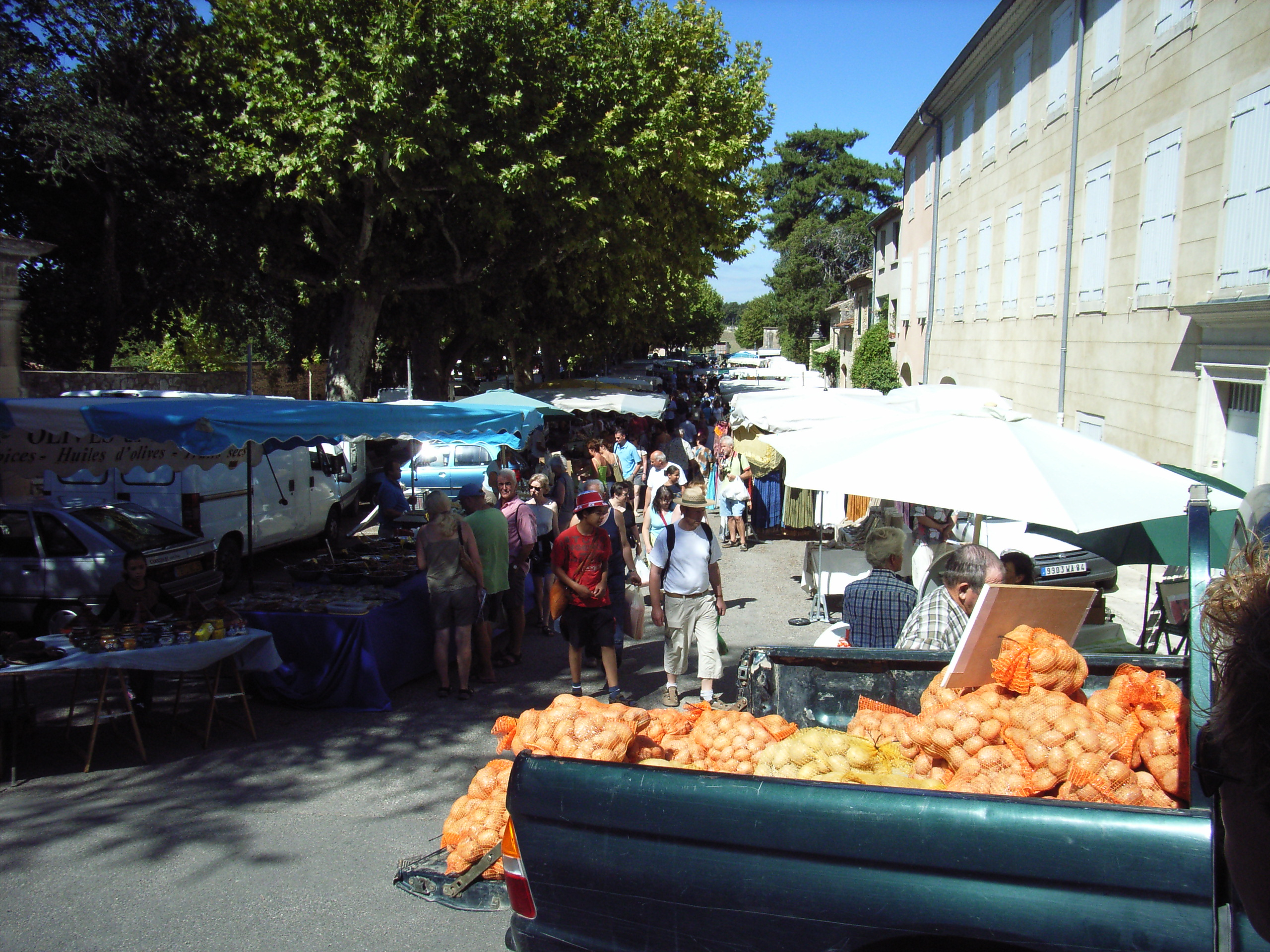
Market in Grignan

The main crops produced in the area are lavender, truffles, wheat, and sunflowers. Nearby is the village of Nyons, world-famous for its olives.

== History ==
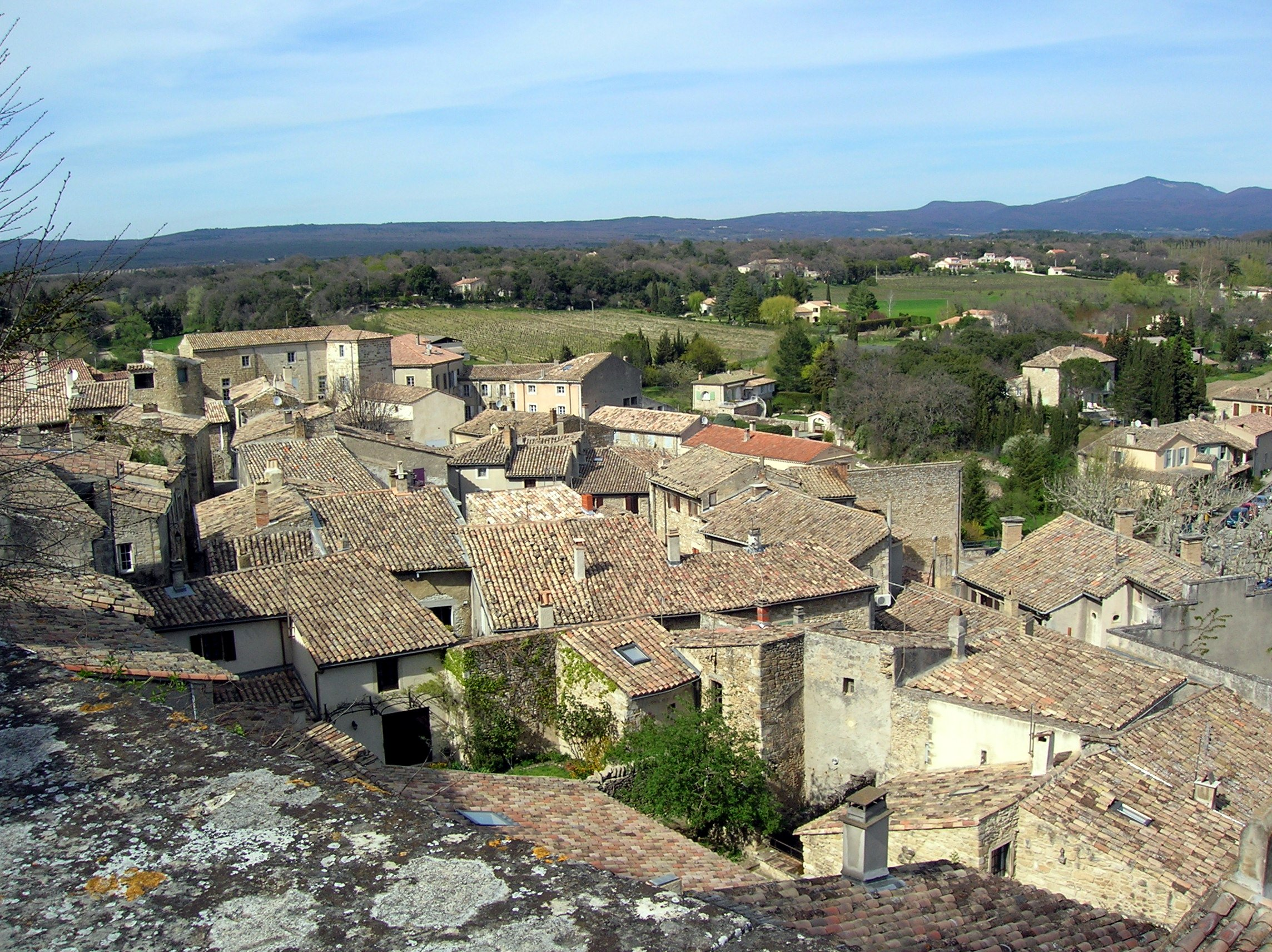
View of Grignan

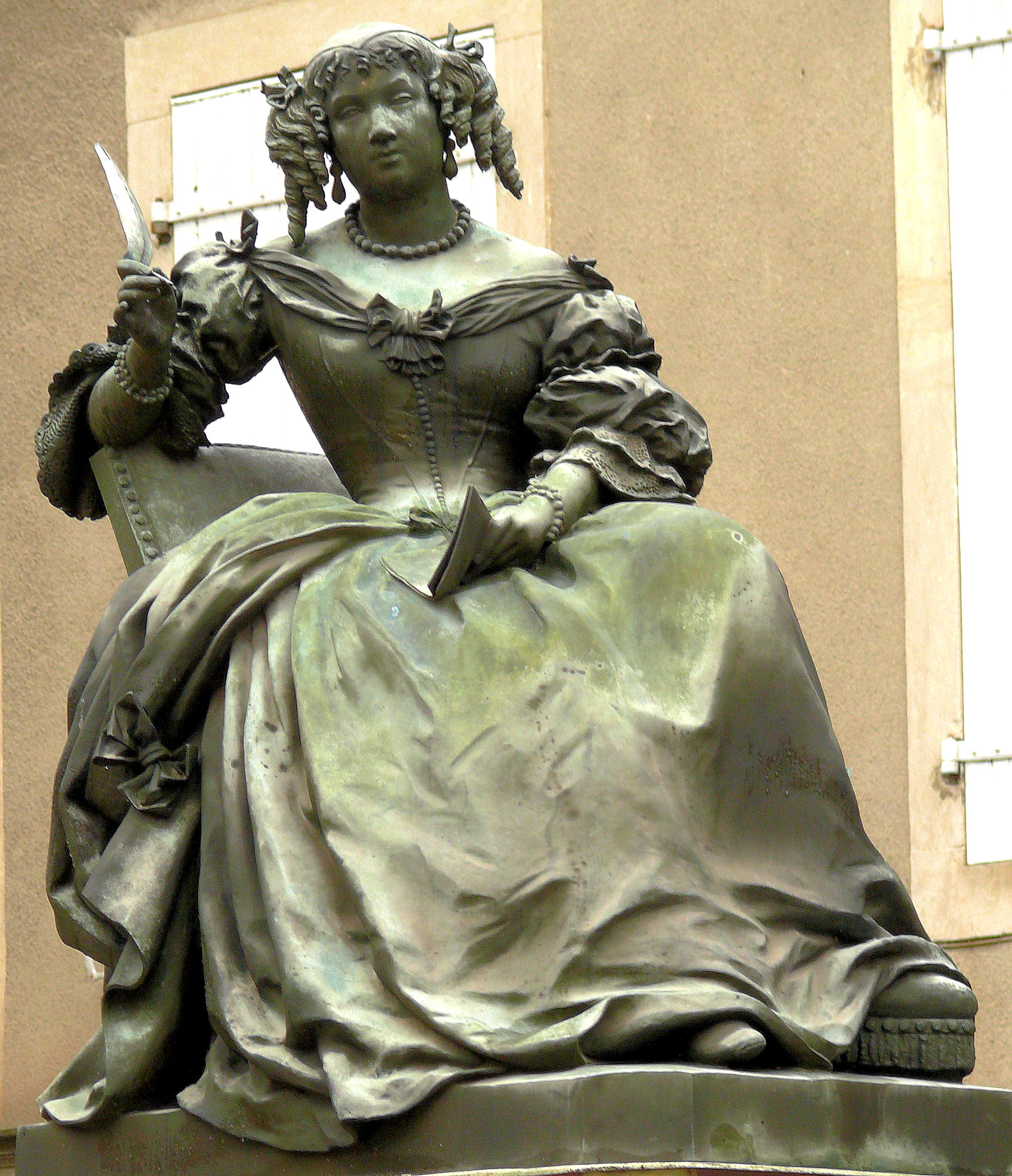
Statue of Madame de Sévigné in Grignan

Several archeological excavations have shown that the rocky promontory of Grignan has been occupied since the Iron Age. There is evidence of a former Bronze Age society here, as well as Roman occupation in the 5th and 6th centuries AD. Historians have noted that in the year 1035, a cartulaire (a ledger of church or monastery property titles) from the Abbey of Saint-Chaffre in the Haute-Loire, makes mention of an obscure castellum Gradignanum. Over the next century, the name steadily evolved to become the castrum Grainan (1105), then Graigna, Grazinam ... We know very little about the birth of the castle or those who built it. The existence of a certain Christophe de Grignan has been established some time around the year 1030, and in 1035, the cartulaire of Saint-Chaffre, speaks of a 'Rostaing du château de Grignan,' Rostagnus de castello Gradignano.

A century later, according to various documents, the Grignan family appears to have become well established. It is precisely during this time that the Grignans seem to have lost the ownership of the castle which bears their name. Beginning in 1239, the records show that Grignan ceased to belong to the Grignans ... but to the Adhémar de Monteil family.

The expansion of the castle coincided with the rise in power of the Adhémars of Grignan. The Adhémars were up-and-coming so their castle necessarily had to follow. Beginning in the 13th century, the Adhémars rose from Barons to Dukes, finally being elevated to the rank of Counts by King Henry II of France. Grignan Castle progressively became an imposing stronghold. The Adhémar family line ended when Louis Adhémar died without an heir in 1559. The titles and possessions of Louis Adhémar, Count of Grignan, fell upon his nephew Gaspard de Castellane, son of Louis' sister Blanche Adhémar. Although the Adhémars were an illustrious family, in terms of sheer glory they were rivalled by the Castellane clan.

The castle was eventually inherited by François de Castellane-Ornano-Adhémar de Monteil de Grignan, who carried among his titles the Duke of Termoli, Count of Grignan, Count of Campobasso, and the Baron of Entrecasteaux, as well as a knight in the service of King Louis XIV. He was governor general of Provence, and through the Dutch of their cíty of Orange.

François, the last Count of Grignan, was two-times a widower (his wives Angélique-Clarisse d'Angiennes, daughter of the Marquis de Rambouillet, and Marie-Angélique du Puy-du-Fou having died in quick succession). For his third marriage, he chose a certain Françoise-Marguerite de Sévigné, daughter of the marquise of the same name whose illustrious letters have perpetuated the memory of her son-in-law—and his castle to this very day.

Madame de Sévigné travelled three times to Provence (that is to say, Aix and Grignan) in order to spend time with her daughter and son-in-law: a 14-month stay beginning in 1672; another 14-month stay beginning in 1690 taken before a quick trip to Brittany; and a third stay of 22 months leading right up to her death in 1696. In other words, Madame de Sévigné spent only a little less than four years total in the part of France which occupied so much space in her heart and letters.

== Population ==
Historical population
Year	Pop.	±% p.a.
1968	1,113	—
1975	1,099	−0.18%
1982	1,147	+0.61%
1990	1,300	+1.58%
1999	1,353	+0.44%
2007	1,479	+1.12%
2012	1,618	+1.81%
2017	1,551	−0.84%
2023	1,596	+0.48%
Source: INSEE

== Sights ==
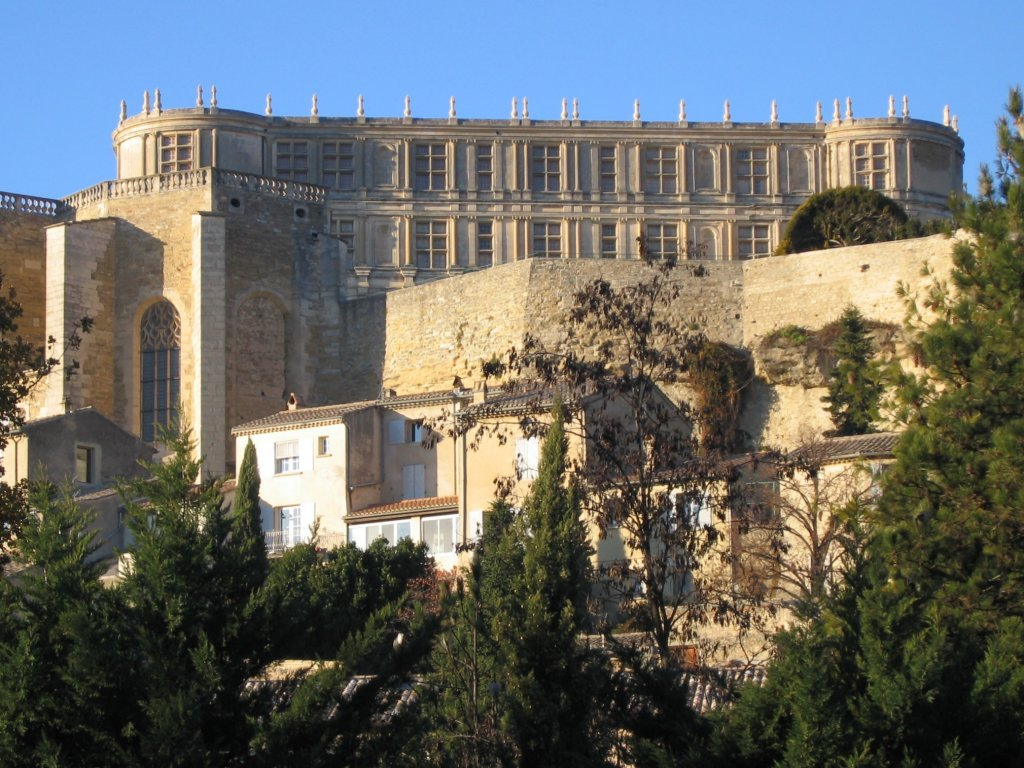
Château de Grignan

Louis Adhemar, governor of Provence, remodelled the medieval castle from 1545 to 1558. From 1668 to 1690, François de Castellane-Adhemar turned it into a sumptuous Renaissance palace. Construction on the site of Grignan's present castle was originally begun in the 12th century, but it wasn't until the 13th century that the Adhémar family expanded it into a mighty fortress. In the 17th century, François Adhémar de Monteil transformed the fortress into a luxurious residence. Reduced to ruins in 1793, it was reconstructed in the early 20th century by Madame Fontaine who spent her entire fortune to restore the castle to its former grandeur. Presently, the castle belongs to the Drôme département and is a major tourist attraction.

=== Collegiate Church of the Holy Saviour ===
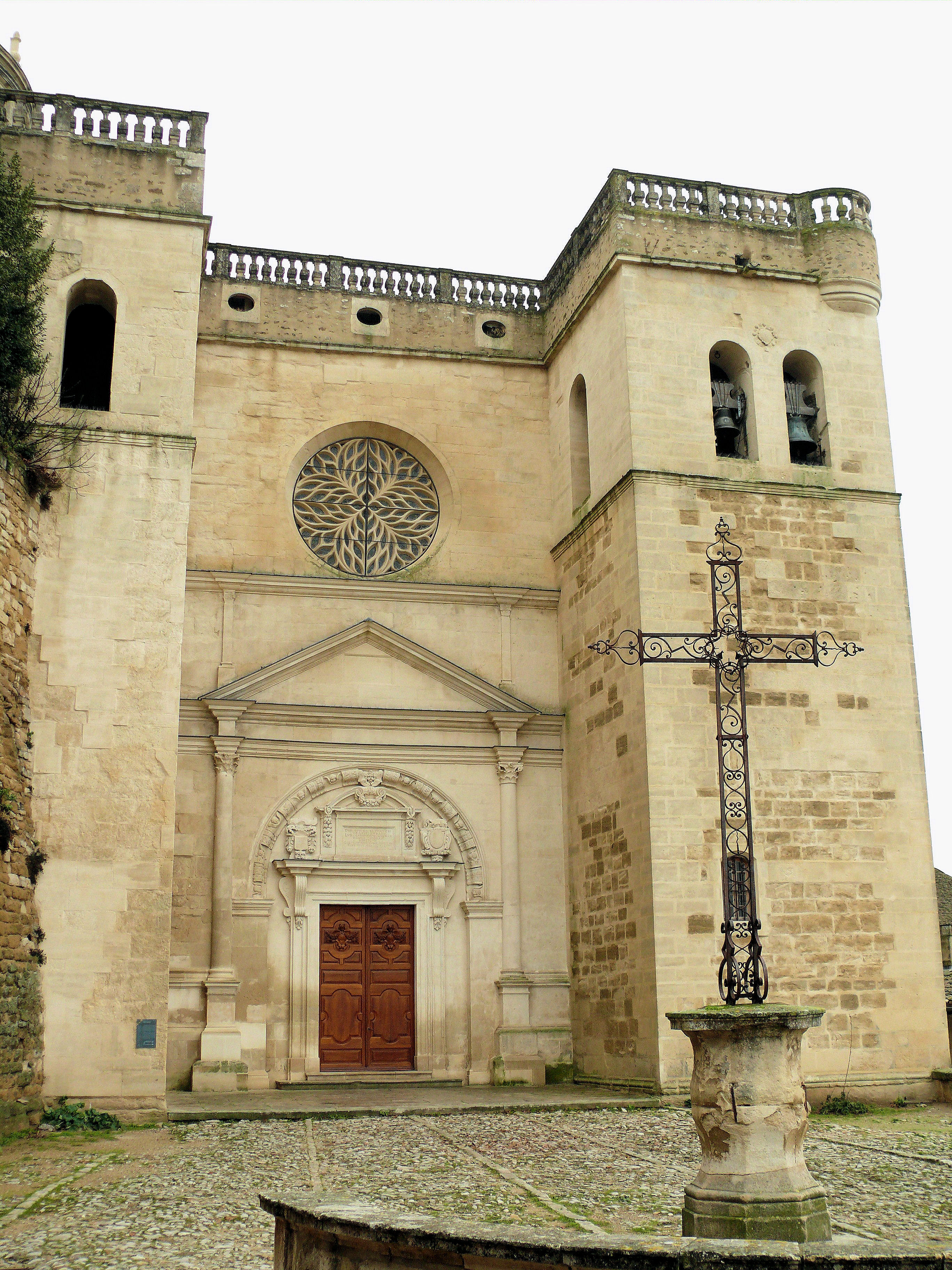
Collégiale Saint-Sauveur

Located under the castle terrace, the collegiate church was constructed between 1535 and 1539 at the request of Louis Adhémar. The Renaissance façade is flanked by two square towers and a Gothic rose window. Inside is a 17th-century altar and organ loft. On the floor in front of the altar is a marble funerary stone marking the sealed entrance to the tomb of Madame de Sévigné.

=== Rochecourbière Cave ===
Located about a half kilometre from Grignan, this shallow, natural cave sheltered from the Provençal sun, was a favourite writing spot of Madame de Sévigné.

== Notable people ==
- Morton Beiser (born 1936), member of the Order of Canada
- Roger Duchêne (1930–2006), biographer specializing in the letters of Madame de Sévigné
- Bruno Durieux (born 1944), mayor of Grignan
- Sérgio Ferro (born 1938), Brazilian painter, architect, and professor
- J. Timothy Hunt (born 1959), American-Canadian author and journalist
- Philippe Jaccottet (1925-2021), Swiss poet and translator who publishes in French
- François-Adhémar de Monteil de Grignan (1632–1714), Comte de Grignan
- Françoise-Marguerite de Sévigné (1646–1705), Comtesse de Grignan
- Madame de Sévigné (1626–1696), French aristocrat, remembered for her letters

== See also ==
- Communes of the Drôme department
