= J. Timothy Hunt =

Canadian writer and script supervisor

James Timothy Hunt
- Born: April 1, 1959 (age 67); Los Angeles, California, U.S.
- Occupations: Author, journalist, script supervisor
- Spouse: Morton Beiser
- Writing career
- Pen name: Tim Beiser
- Genres: Non-fiction, children's fiction, science fiction
- Website: www.jtimothyhunt.com

James Timothy Hunt (born April 1, 1959) is an American-Canadian author, journalist, and script supervisor. He has also written children's books under the pen name Tim Beiser.

== Biography ==
Hunt was born and raised in Los Angeles, California, and attended university in Montana, receiving a B.S. in Economics and Business Administration from Rocky Mountain College in 1981. He became a Canadian citizen in 2004, and resides in Toronto, Ontario, Canada, and Grignan, France, with his husband, Morton Beiser and twin sons, Daniel and Rowan.

== Publishing ==
Hunt is the author of nine published books. He has been nominated twice for Canada's Governor General's Awards, and four times for Canadian National Magazine Awards. He has received two Canada Council Grants for writing and has been writer in residence three times at the Helene Wurlitzer Foundation of New Mexico. He received a B.A.A. in Journalism from Toronto's Ryerson University in 1999.

Hunt has written for several Canadian newspapers and magazines, including National Post Business, Toronto Life, Elm Street, Reader's Digest, and Saturday Night. A feature article in Saturday Night in June 2000 about Nigerian environmentalist Ken Saro-Wiwa was expanded in 2005 into the book The Politics of Bones.

In 2007, Hunt began writing children's fiction for Tundra Books under the pseudonym Tim Beiser.

Hunt's first work of literary fiction, The Museum of Lies was published by Clink Street Publishing in February, 2025.

== Film and television ==
Since 2013, Hunt as worked as a script supervisor, screenwriter, and actor in the film and television industry. He holds a master's degree in film studies from Staffordshire University.

== Books ==
=== As J. Timothy Hunt ===
- The Politics of Bones
- Killing Time in Taos
- Madame de Sévigné and Her Children at the Court of Versailles, English translation of 1882 novella by Le Bibliophile Jacob
- Script Supervision and Continuity Course Handbook
- The Museum of Lies

=== As Tim Beiser ===
- Bradley McGogg, the Very Fine Frog
- Miss Mousie's Blind Date
- Little Chicken Duck
- There, There

=== List of awards ===
- Canada Council for the Arts: "The Marquise Skull Affair," (Creative Writing Grant), 2007
- Canadian National Magazine Award: "For Better or Worse?" (Nominee, Best Essay), 2006
- Canada Council for the Arts: "The Politics of Bones," (Creative Writing Grant), 2001
- Canadian National Magazine Award: "The politics of bones," (Nominee, Best Profile), 2001
- Canadian National Magazine Award: "Moving target," (Nominee, Best Technology Article), 2001
- Canadian National Magazine Award: "An Incredible Hodgepodge of Weirdness," (Nominee, Best Profile), 2000
- James H. Carter Award, 1999
- Mark Bastien Award: "An Incredible Hodgepodge of Weirdness," (Best Article), 1999
- AJEMC Award: "An Incredible Hodgepodge of Weirdness," (silver), 1999
- Gordon Sinclair Award, 1998
- Chinese Community Award, 1998
- Women's Press Club of Toronto Award, 1998
- Poets & Writers' Jean Paiva Award:"Best New Writer," 1993

=== As Tim Beiser ===
- Governor General's Award, Children's Literature Illustration (Nominee) 2009 & 2013
- Canadian Booksellers Association Libris Award 2010—Children's Picture Book of the Year (Nominee)
- Ontario Library Association's 2010 Forest of Reading, Blue Spruce Award (Nominee)
- Canadian Toy Testing Council, Top 10 Books of the year 2010.
- Chocolate Lily Book Awards 2010–2011, Picture book (Nominee)
