= Roger Duchêne =

French biographer (1930–2006)

Roger Duchêne (3 February 1930 – 25 April 2006) was a French biographer specializing in the letters of Madame de Sévigné.

Duchêne became a member of l'Académie de Marseille in 1972, and received the Grand Prize of l'Académie du Vaucluse en 1980, as well as the Prix du Roi René, le Grand Prix littéraire de Provence in 1983, and received the George Castex l'Académie des Sciences Morales et Politiques Prize and the Grand Prize for Literary Biography from the Académie Française, of which he had already been named laureate for his works published in 1979, 1983 et 1991.

He lived in Marseille, until his death in 2006, aged 75.

Duchêne's works include:

- Madame de Sévigné, ou, la chance d'être femme
- Chère Madame de Sévigné..., coll. "Découvertes Gallimard" (nº 253)
- Madame de Sévigné, Correspondance
- Madame de Sévigné et la lettre d'amour
- Naissances d'un écrivain: Madame de Sévigné
- L'Impossible Marcel Proust
- La Fontaine
- Molière
- Ninon de Lenclos, ou, La manière jolie de faire l'amour
- Madame de La Fayette
- Marseille
- Etre femme au temps de Louis XIV
- Les précieuses, ou, Comment l'esprit vint aux femmes
- Mon Dix-septième siècle: de Mme de Sévigné à Marcel Proust
