= Marie de Rabutin-Chantal, marquise de Sévigné =

French aristocrat (1626–1696)

Madame Marie de Rabutin-Chantal
- Marquise de Sévigné
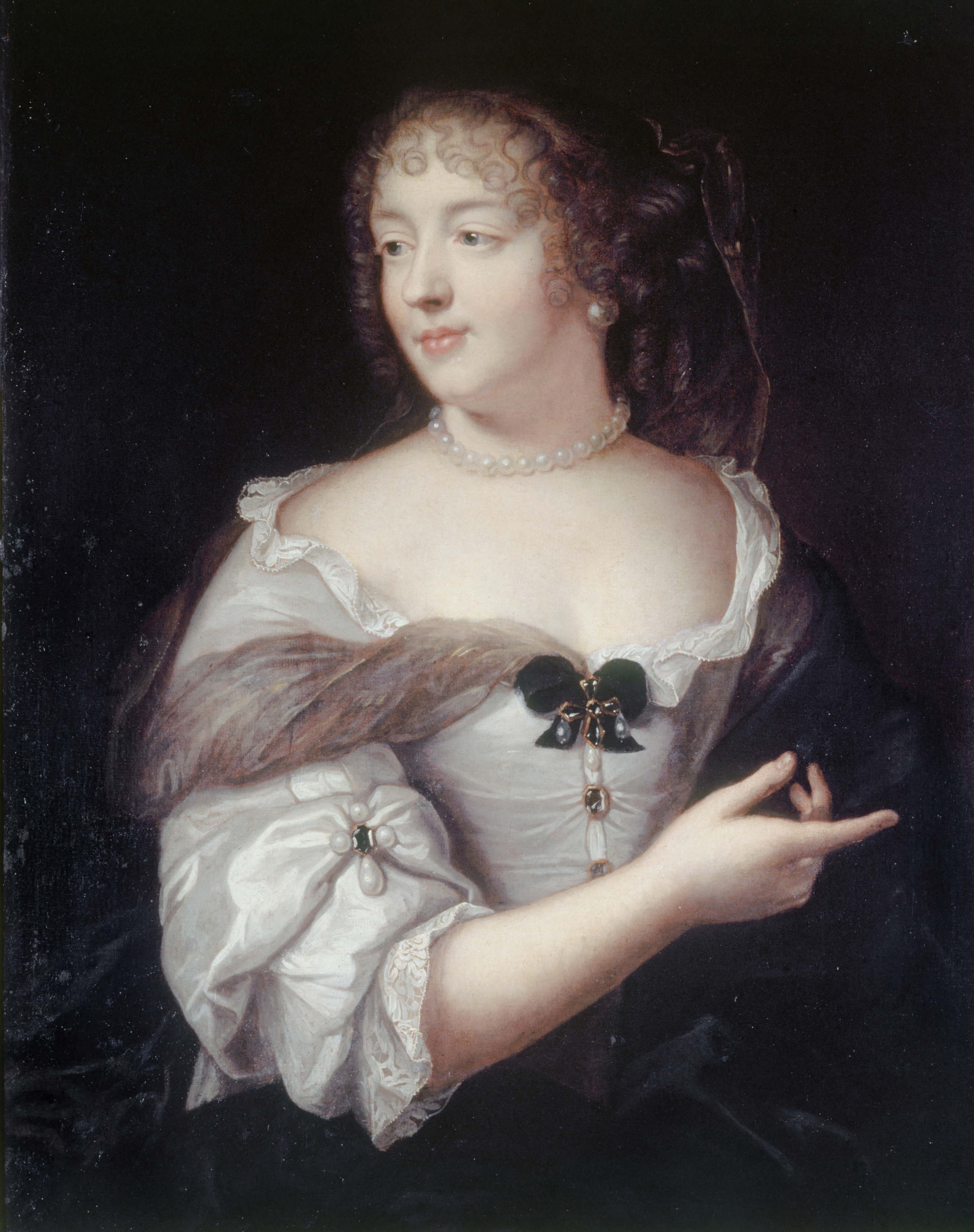
- Marquise de Sévigné by Claude Lefèbvre (1665)
- Known for: French Baroque woman of letters
- Born: 5 February 1626; Paris, Kingdom of France
- Died: 17 April 1696 (aged 70); Grignan, Kingdom of France
- Noble family: de Chantal
- Spouses: Henri de Sévigné, Marquis de Sévigné
- Issue: Françoise-Marguerite de Sévigné; Charles de Sévigné
- Father: Celse Bénigne de Rabutin
- Mother: Marie de Coulanges

Marie de Rabutin-Chantal, marquise de Sévigné (French: [maʁi də ʁabytɛ̃ ʃɑ̃tal]; 5 February 1626 – 17 April 1696), also widely known as Madame de Sévigné or Mme de Sévigné ([madam də seviɲe]), was a French aristocrat, remembered for her letter-writing. Most of her letters, celebrated for their wit and vividness, were addressed to her daughter, Françoise-Marguerite de Sévigné. She is revered in France as one of the great icons of French 17th-century literature.

== Life ==
Marie de Rabutin-Chantal was born in Place des Vosges (then called the Place Royale), Paris, to a well distinguished family from Burgundy. Her father, Celse Bénigne de Rabutin, baron de Chantal, was the son of Saint Jeanne Françoise de Chantal, a friend and disciple of Saint Francis de Sales; her mother was Marie de Coulanges. Her father was killed during the English attack on the Isle of Rhé in July 1627, which began the Anglo-French War of 1627-1629. His wife did not survive him by many years, and Marie was left an orphan at the age of seven. She then passed into the care of her maternal grandparents. When her grandfather, Philippe de Coulanges, died in 1636, her uncle, Christophe de Coulanges, abbé of Livry, became her guardian. She received a good education in his care and often referred to him in her correspondence as "le Bien Bon" [the very good].

Marie de Rabutin-Chantal married Henri, marquis de Sévigné, a nobleman from Brittany allied to the oldest houses of that province, but of no great estate. The marriage took place on 4 August 1644, and the couple went almost immediately to the Sévigné manor house of Les Rochers, near Vitré (which she was to immortalize in her letters). She gave birth to a daughter, Françoise, on 10 October 1646 (whether at Les Rochers or in Paris is not certain), and to a son, Charles, at Les Rochers on 12 March 1648.

Henri was a serial philanderer who spent money recklessly, but through her uncle's careful financial oversight Marie was able to keep much of her fortune separate. On 4 February 1651, Henri de Sévigné was mortally wounded in a duel with the Chevalier d'Albret after a quarrel over his mistress, Mme de Gondran, and died two days later. Though only twenty-four when her husband died, Mme de Sévigné never married again. Instead, she devoted herself to her children. She spent most of 1651 in retirement at Les Rochers, but returned to Paris that November. Thereafter, she divided her time between the city and the countryside. In Paris, she frequented salons, especially that of Nicolas Fouquet, superintendent of finances to King Louis XIV.

Mme de Sévigné's most amusing correspondence before her daughter's marriage was addressed to her cousin and friend Roger de Bussy-Rabutin. However, in 1658, she quarrelled with him.

On 29 January 1669, her daughter Françoise married François Adhémar de Monteil, comte de Grignan, a nobleman from Provence who had been married twice before. The couple intended to live in Paris, but Grignan was soon appointed as lieutenant governor of Provence, necessitating that they live there. Mme de Sévigné was very close to her daughter, and sent her the first of her famous letters on 6 February 1671. Their correspondence lasted until Mme de Sévigné's death.

By 1673, Mme de Sévigné's letters were being copied and circulated. Therefore, she knew that her letters were semi-public documents and crafted them accordingly.

The year 1676 saw several important events in Mme de Sévigné's life. For the first time she was seriously ill and did not thoroughly recover until she had visited Vichy. The letters depicting life at this 17th-century spa are among her best. The trial and execution of Madame de Brinvilliers took place that same year. This event figures in the letters.

The following year, in 1677, she moved into the Hôtel Carnavalet and welcomed the whole Grignan family to it. She returned to Provence in October 1678. On 17 March 1680, she had the grief of losing La Rochefoucauld, the most eminent and one of her closest friends. The proportion of letters for the decade 1677–1687 is much smaller than that which represents the decade preceding it. In February 1684, her son Charles married Jeanne Marguerite de Mauron from Brittany. In the arrangements for this marriage, Mme de Sévigné divided all her fortune among her children and reserved for herself only part of the life interest.

In 1688, the whole family was greatly excited by the first campaign of the young marquis de Grignan, Mme de Grignan's only son, who was sent splendidly equipped to the siege of Philippsburg. In the same year, Mme de Sévigné attended the Saint-Cyr performance of Racine's Esther, and some of her most amusing descriptions of court ceremonies and experiences date from this time. In 1689, she wrote positively of the preacher Antoine Anselme.

The year 1693 saw the loss of two of her oldest friends: her cousin Roger de Bussy-Rabutin and Madame de La Fayette. There was a family connection between these two great writers: in 1650, Mme de La Fayette's mother, then widowed, married Renaud de Sévigné, uncle of the great letter writer. Another friend almost as intimate, Mme de Lavardin, followed in 1694.

During an illness of her daughter in 1696, Mme de Sévigné caught a "fever" (possibly influenza or pneumonia), and died on 17 April at Grignan, and was buried there. Her daughter was not present during her illness.

== Works ==
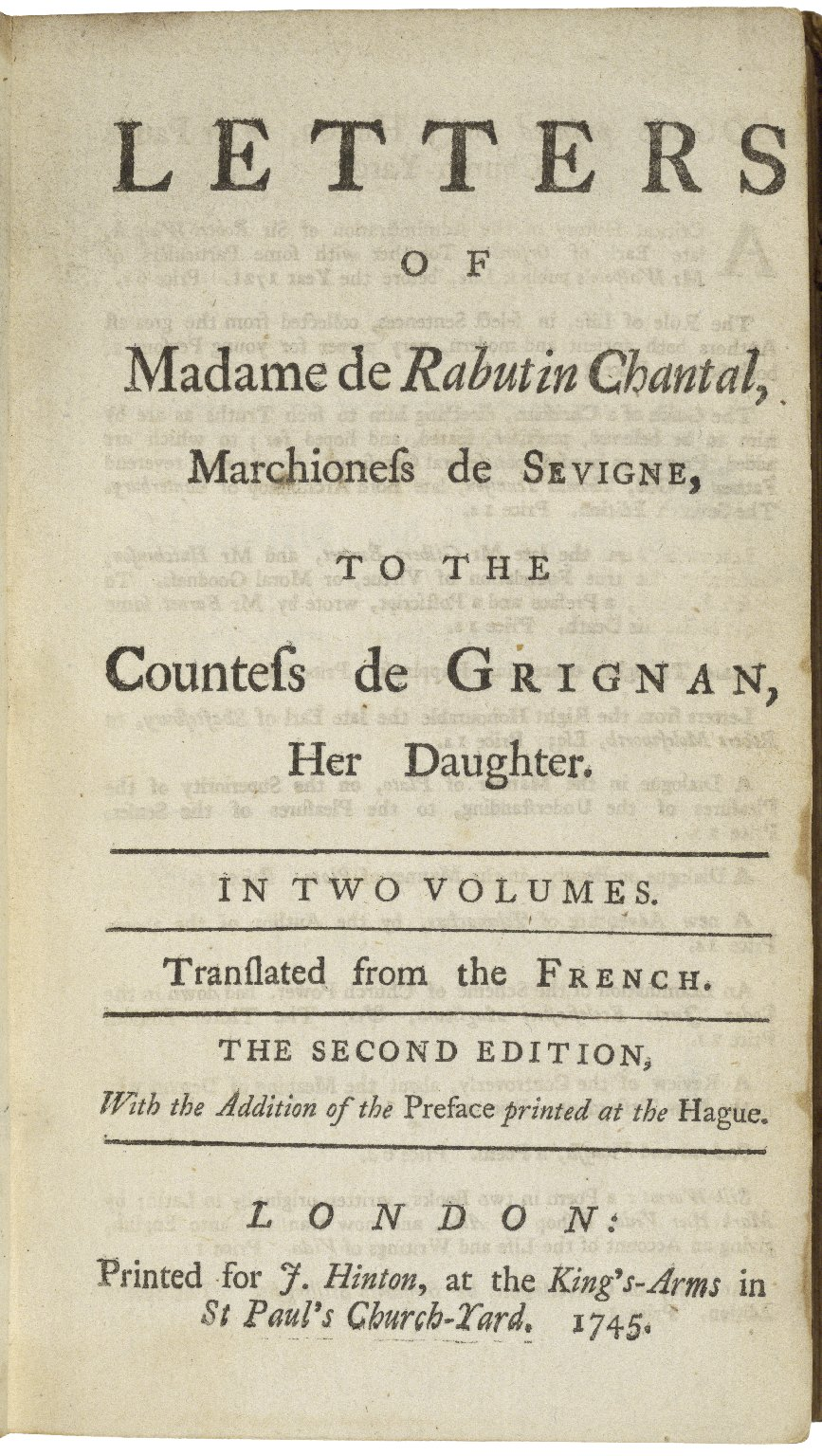
The title page of a 1745 English edition of Mme de Sévigné's letters.

Madame de Sévigné corresponded with her daughter for nearly thirty years. A clandestine edition, containing twenty-eight letters or portions of letters, was published in 1725, followed by two others the next year. Pauline de Simiane, Mme de Sévigné's granddaughter, decided to officially publish her grandmother's correspondence. Working with the editor Denis-Marius Perrin of Aix-en-Provence, she published 614 letters in 1734–1737, then 772 letters in 1754. The letters were selected according to Mme de Simiane's instructions: she rejected those that dealt too closely with family matters, or those that seemed poorly written. The remaining letters were often rewritten in accordance with the style of the day. This raises a question of the letters' authenticity.

Of the 1,120 known letters, only 15 percent are signed, the others having been destroyed soon after they were read. However, in 1873, some early manuscript copies of the letters, directly based on Mme de Sévigné's originals, were found in an antique shop. These accounted for about half of the letters to Mme de Grignan.

Mme de Sévigné's letters play an important role in the novel In Search of Lost Time by Marcel Proust where they figure as the favorite reading of the narrator's grandmother, and, following her death, his mother. De Sévigné is the model for María, Marquesa de Montemayor, in Thornton Wilder's novel The Bridge of San Luis Rey.

== Fictional portrayals ==
- Si Versailles m'était conté... (1954). Feature film written and directed by Sacha Guitry. Madame de Sévigné is played by Jeanne Boitel.
- La Marquise de Rabutin-Chantal
- Madame de Sévigné (TV). Madame de Sévigné is played by Claude Jade.
- D'Artagnan amoureux (1977). TV series in five episodes, directed by Yannick Andréi. The young Marie de Rabutin-Chantal is played by Aniouta Florent.
- Madame de Sévigné: Idylle familiale (1979). Madame de Sévigné is played by Évelyne Grandjean.
- Madame de Sévigné à Grignan (2000). Documentary film directed by Claude Vernick.
- Sévigné (2005). Feature film written and directed by Marta Balletbò-Coll. In this film, the life of Júlia Berkowitz, a prestigious theatre director based in Barcelona, takes an unexpected turn when she decides to produce a play based on Madame de Sévigné. Berkowitz/ Sévigné is played by Anna Azcona. The film was awarded "Best Feature Film" at the 2005 edition of the Philadelphia Film Festival.
- Le Roi, l'Écureuil et la Couleuvre (2010, TV). Madame de Sévigné is played by Carole Richert.
