= Harvey of Léon =

Harvey of Léon was the name of several members of the House of Léon who were Viscounts of Léon or Lords of Léon.

== Viscounts of Léon ==
- Harvey I
- Harvey II
- Harvey III
- Harvey IV

== Lords of Léon ==
- Harvey I
- Harvey II
- Harvey III
- Harvey IV
- Harvey V
- Harvey VI
- Harvey VII
- Harvey VIII
