= Guihomar of Léon =

Guihomar of Léon was the name of several Viscounts of Léon.

- Guihomar I
- Guihomar II
- Guihomar III
- Guihomar IV
- Guihomar V
- Guihomar VI
