= Lordship of Léon =

Breton fief in Léon province

Arms of the House of Léon

The Lordship of Léon, later Principality of Léon was a former Breton fief located in the Léon province, in north-western Brittany, which corresponds roughly to the French département Finistère. This lordship was created after the Viscounty of Léon was divided into a viscounty and the lordship at the end of the 12th century. The lordship of Léon was a large fief made of about sixty parishes and trèves. The estates of the lordship are located around the valley of the Élorn river, the town of Landerneau and the castle of La Roche-Maurice. The lordship was initially held by the junior branch of the Viscounts of Léon, which was founded by Harvey I. After Harvey VIII died without issue, the fief was inherited by the Viscounts of Rohan. In the middle of the 16th century the fief became known as "Principality of Léon". Landerneau, Landivisiau, Daoulas, Coat-Méal, Penzé and La Roche-Maurice were the seats of the jurisdictions of this huge Breton lordship.

== History ==
In the 12th century, the Viscounts of Léon rebelled against Henry II of England in order to escape Plantagenet's domination in the Duchy of Brittany. In 1179, after the death of Guihomar IV, who had submitted to the Ducal power not long before, Henry II of England confiscated the Léon estates. Following the confiscation of Morlaix by Duke Geoffrey Plantagenet, Guihomar IV's two sons Guihomar V et Harvey recovered their inheritance. Guihomar V got the castellanies of Lesneven, Brest, Saint-Renan and Le Conquet as well as the title of Viscount. Harvey got the estates of Landerneau and Daoudour, as well as the lordship of Coat-Méal. Being a juveigneur, i.e. a younger son endowed with an estate, Hervé had to content himself with the title of Lord of Léon and founded the junior branch of the House of Léon, which managed to keep his fief of La Roche-Maurice for 8 generations (from Harvey I to Harvey VIII).

== List of Lords and Princes of Léon ==
=== Lords of Léon ===
==== House of Léon ====
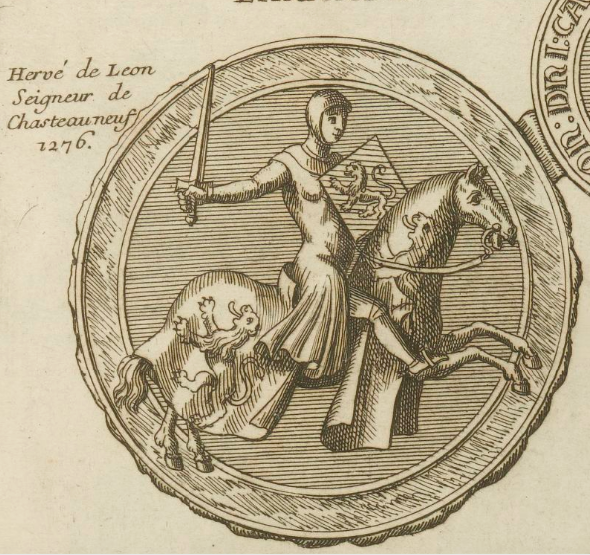
Seal of Harvey IV, Lord of Léon

- Harvey I: younger son of Guihomar IV, Viscount of Léon and his wife Nobilis, died in July 1203.
- Harvey II: his son, married Anne (?) of Hennebont. He died in 1218.
- Harvey III: his son, married Margaret of Châteauneuf (younger daughter of Hugues IV de Châteauneuf, Lord of Châteauneuf-en-Thymerais and Senonches, and Eleanor of Dreux). He died c. 1241.
- Harvey IV: his son, married c. 1260 Matilda of Poissy, Lady of Noyon-sur-Andelle, Radepont, Hacqueville, Acquigny, died c. 1290 and was buried in the Abbey of Fontaine-Guérard. In September 1281 he exchanged all his estated in Châteauneuf and Senonches with King Philip III the Bold. This part of the inheritance went to Louis of Valois, Count of Chartres, who had obtained the estate of Châteauneuf-en-Thymerais. When King Philip VI died childless in 1329, he gave his brother Charles II of Valois, Count of Alençon and Perche, a part of their brother's inheritance, and gave him in a charter dated May 1335 the lands of Châteauneuf-en-Thimerais, Senonches and Champrond among others.
- Harvey V: his son, died in 1304
- Harvey VI: his son, died in 1337, married Joan of Montmorency.
- Harvey VII: his son, died in 1344, married Margaret of Avaugour; Lord of Noyon-sur-Andelle.
- Harvey VIII: his son, born in 1341, died in 1363. His birth certificate has been conserved: "In the Lord's year 1341, the Sunday after the transfer of Saint Martin, during the night, about two hours before sunrise, was born in La Roche-Morice, Harvey of Léon from parents belonging of the highest nobility. His father was My Lord Harvey of Léon, and his mother was My Lady Margaret of Avaugour (…)".

During the War of the Breton Succession which started in 1341, the Lords of Léon supported Charles of Blois partly because of their links with the House of Avaugour. Harvey VII of Léon was captured by the English in 1342 and spent two years imprisoned in the Tower of London. He died in 1344 soon after he was released. The fief of La Roche-Maurice was inherited by his son Harvey VIII of Léon, then aged 3. A note in the Lords of Léon's Bible indicates that Harvey VIII was born in La Roche-Maurice in 1341. During the War of the Breton Succession, the situation became confused. The last Lord of Léon died without issue in 1363. The fief was inherited by John I, Viscount of Rohan through his marriage with Joan of Léon, Harvey VIII's sister.

In 1363, Harvey VIII died without issue: the Lordship of Léon was inherited by his sister Joan, wife of John I of Rohan. The Lordship became part of the estates held by the Rohans. From this time up to 1517, the Rohans' eldest sons would live in the castle of La Roche-Maurice and style themselves Lord of Léon before becoming Viscounts of Rohan.

==== House of Rohan ====
- Edward, son of John I of Rohan, died without issue.
- Alan IX, his nephew, son of Alan VIII, grandson of John I of Rohan, died in 1462
- John I, his son, died in 1517
- James, his son, died in 1527
- Anne, his sister, died in 1529
- René I, her son, died in 1552, styled himself "Prince of Léon" towards 1530

=== Princes of Léon ===
The Viscounts of Rohan, later Dukes of Rohan styled themselves Prince of Léon in the early 16th century and the Lordship became Principality of Léon.

Arms of the House of Rohan

Arms of the House of Rohan-Chabot

- René I of Rohan, died in 1552, styled himself Prince of Léon from c. 1530
- Henry I of Rohan, his son
- René II, Viscount of Rohan, his brother
- Henry II, his son, Viscount and later Duke of Rohan
- Marguerite de Rohan, his daughter
- Henri de Chabot, her husband
- Louis I, Duke of Rohan-Chabot, their son
- Louis II, Duke of Rohan-Chabot, his son
- Louis-Marie-Bretagne, Duke of Rohan-Chabot, his son
- Louis-Antoine, Duke of Rohan-Chabot, his first cousin
- Alexandre-Louis-Auguste, Duke of Rohan-Chabot, his son
- Louis François Auguste, Duke of Rohan-Chabot, his son, became Cardinal after his wife died
- Fernand, Duke of Rohan-Chabot, his brother
- Charles, Duke of Rohan-Chabot, his son
- Alain, Duke of Rohan-Chabot, his son
- Josselin, Duke of Rohan-Chabot, his son
- Alain-Louis-Auguste-Marie, Duke of Rohan-Chabot, his son
- Josselin de Rohan, his son

The heir apparent is the present Duke Josselin de Rohan's son, Alain Louis Marc de Rohan-Chabot (b. 1975)

== See also ==
- Viscounty of Léon

== Sources ==
- Patrick Kernévez et Robert le Roy, La seigneurie de Léon aux XVe-XVIe siècles, in Bulletin de la Société archéologique du Finistère, tome CXXXV, 2006, read online, p. 299-319.
