= Harvey VII, Lord of Léon =

Herve VII, Lord of Léon
- Breton Lord and Knight
- Coat of Arms Léon Family
- Born: Duchy of Brittany
- Died: 1344; Angers (?)
- Spouses: Margaret of Retz; Margaret of Avaugour
- Issue: Harvey VIII; Joanna; Mary; Catherine
- Military career
- Allegiance: Kingdom of France then House of Montfort then House of Blois
- Hundred Years' War War of the Breton Succession: 1341–1344
- Conflicts: Siege of Vannes (1342)

Herve VII of Léon (died 1344) was a Breton lord, son of Herve VI, Lord of Léon and his wife Joanna of Montmorency. Also known as Herve. He succeeded his father as Lord of Léon in 1337. He was also Lord of Noyon-sur-Andelle. The Lords of Léon were a junior branch of the Viscounts of Léon which was founded by Harvey I, second son of Guihomar IV, Viscount of Léon. Herve VII won fame during the War of the Breton Succession.

== Life ==
Herve VII of Léon was the son of Herve VI, Lord of Léon, and Joanna of Montmorency (born c. 1287), the eldest daughter of Erard of Montmorency, Lord of Conflans, and Joanna, Lady of Longueval.

Herve VII of Léon succeeded his father as Lord of Léon in 1337. His fief was the castle of La Roche-Maurice.

=== First Marriage ===
In 1323 or 1326, Herve married Margaret of Retz, daughter of Girard III Chabot, Lord of Retz, and Mary of Parthenay. She died in 1333 or 1334 without issue.

=== Second Marriage ===
After his first wife's death, he married Margaret of Avaugour (1302 – 20 June 1375), daughter of Henry IV of Avaugour, Lord of Goëllo and Mayenne, and Joan of Harcourt. Margaret was the aunt of Joan of Penthièvre, the daughter of Guy de Penthièvre and Joan of Avaugour, and niece of the Breton Duke John III. Harvey VII made several agreements concerning the share of Margaret's inheritance, his wife being her father's main heir. The rich heiress also claimed part of the inheritance of her grandfather Henry III as well as her aunt Blanche in lands in Normandy, Mayenne and Goëlo. She also owned a house in Paris, the "Maison d'Ardoise", located in the rue Saint-Denis.

The inheritance of the House of Avaugour brought about many disputes that would last until the late 14th century. These disputes pitted Herve VII and his wife against important figures such as the Bishops of Saint-Malo and Cornouaille, the seneschal of Quimper and Harvey IV, Lord of Pont-l'Abbé.

The couple had four children:

- Harvey VIII of Léon, who succeeded his father.
- Joanna of Léon. In 1349, she married John I of Rohan, who inherited the lordship of Léon and Noyon in 1363. Noyon had belonged to a junior branch of the Lords of Léon. When her brother died childless in 1363, she brought the estates of Léon to John I. Their daughter Joanna of Rohan married firstly Robert of Alençon in 1374, and secondly Peter II of Amboise.
- Mary of Léon, who married John of Kergorlay in 1362. She was widowed and married secondly John Mallet, Lord of Graville before 1369.
- Catherine de Léon, who married Henry of Plédran, a knight and councillor of Duke Charles and Duchess Joan. She married secondly a distant cousin, William of Léon, lord of Hacqueville, grandson of William of Léon, the brother of Harvey VI of Léon.

Herve VII of Léon is said to have had a fourth daughter, Margaret, who married Yvon of Trogoff, but this daughter is never mentioned in the division charters.

=== Hundred Years War ===
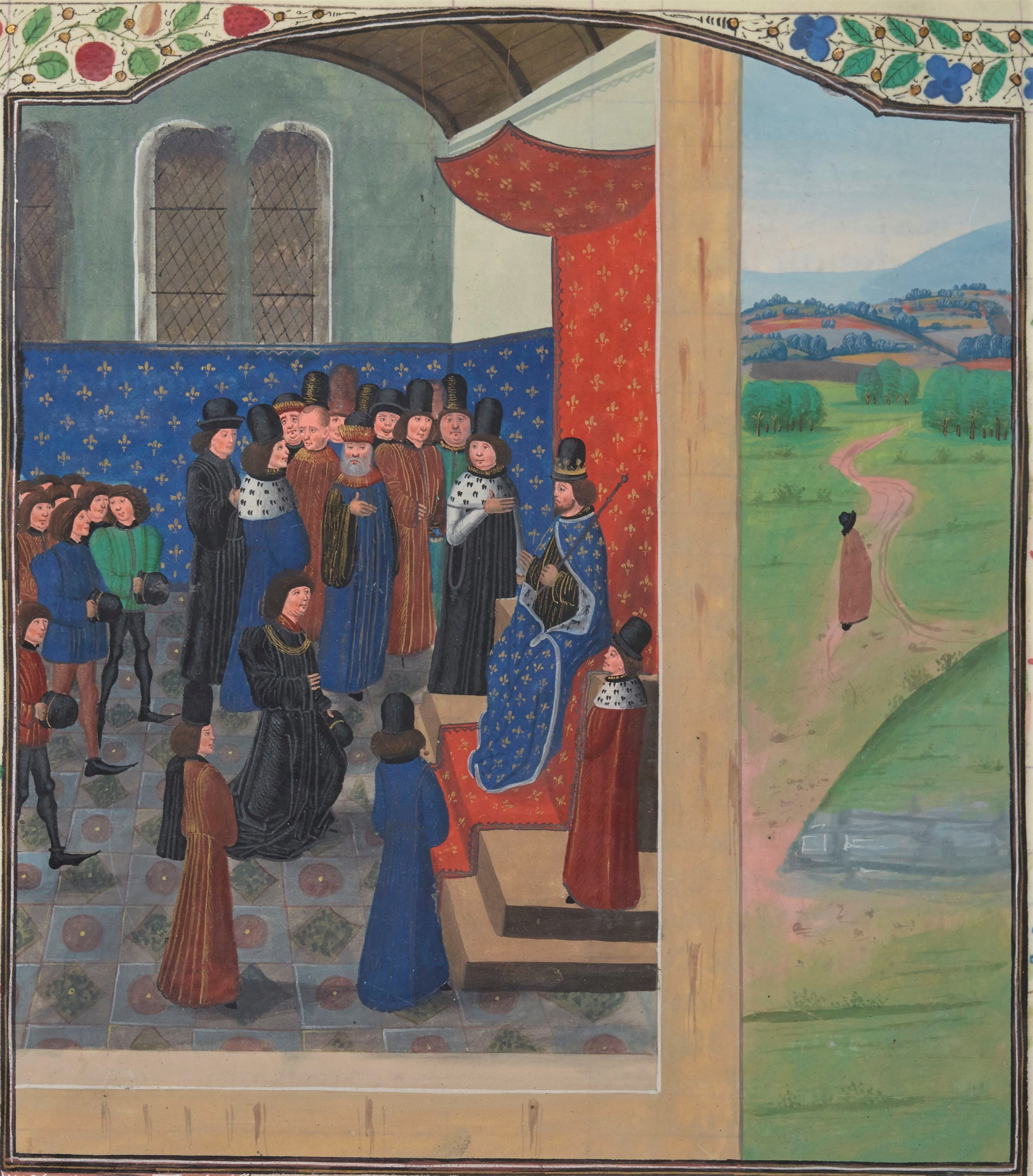
John of Montfort and Philip VI of France.

Due to Herve VII holding estates in France and Normandy he was also deemed a vassal of the French king. He participated in the French campaign in Flanders from the summer of 1340.

==== The war within the war: Breton War of Succession ====
After Duke John III the Good of Brittany died without an apparent heir, a dispute arose amongst the Dukes relatives. Although Herve VII was related to Joan of Penthièvre, he initially sided with John of Montfort, during the Breton War of Succession. John summoned an assembly of the great Breton lords in May 1341 in order to assert his rights to the throne of Brittany. Herve VII is said to have accompanied John of Montfort during his legendary tour around Brittany in June and July 1341 and to gather support for his cause.

In September, however the French King Philip VI of France acknowledged the other claimant, Charles of Blois Duke of Brittany through the rights of his wife Joan of Penthièvre as the new Duke.

In November, the French, with Charles of Blois Breton supporters besieged Nantes, then held by John of Montfort. Herve VII, who defended the city of Nantes, became the target of John of Montfort's reproaches after a disastrous sortie resulted in the death of many Breton knights. The town of Nantes was taken on 21 November 1341 after a three-week siege. John of Montfort was taken prisoner and imprisoned in the Louvre in Paris. His wife Joanna carried on the struggle on his behalf. The criticism made by John of Montfort to Herve VII resulted in Herve VII shifting his allegiance and he now sided with Charles of Blois. Herve VII went on to besiege the towns of Hennebont and Carhaix for the Franco-Breton alliance.

===== Anglo-Breton capture =====
When he was at the episcopal manor of Trégarantec, Herve VII was captured by Walter Manny and Tanguy du Châtel and sent to England. He was exchanged with another Breton, Olivier IV de Clisson by the English for the Earl of Salisbury, who had been taken prisoner by the Franco-Bretons after the siege of Vannes.

He was taken prisoner once more, sent back to England and was released only after a ransom of 100,000 écus. His wife is said to have gathered the ransom and the "Maison d'Ardoise" was sold in 1343 or 1344 to the Confrérie Saint-Jacques for pilgrims, for the modest sum of 620 livres which she apparently used "for the liberation of the said lord Herve of Léon, who was, as they said, a prisoner of the English king in the town of London"

=== Release and later life ===
Herve VII apparently died “while returning to his country in the town of Angiers” probably in late 1344.

=== Other campaigns ===
The chronicler Jean Froissart mentions his feats against the Spanish Moors and the Prussian pagans.

== Bibliography ==
- Chaillou, Léa. The House of Léon: Genealogy and Origins. Foundations: The Journal of the Foundation for Medieval Genealogy, volume 11, 2019, pp. 19–48 ISSN 1479-5078
- Arthur de La Borderie Histoire de Bretagne réédition Joseph Floch Imprimeur Éditeur à Mayenne (1975) « Tome Troisième (995-1364) » p. 425,426 n°1,428,437-438,444,455,459-460,464,469 n°3,474.
- Patrick Kernévez, Frédéric Morvan, Généalogie des Hervé de Léon (vers 1180 – 1363) in Bulletin de la Société archéologique du Finistère, Tome CXXXI, 2002, p. 279-312.
