= Harvey VI, Lord of Léon =

Breton noble

Herve VI, Lord of Léon
- Breton Lord and Knight
- Coat of Arms Léon Family
- Born: Duchy of Brittany
- Died: 1337
- Spouse: Joanna Montmorency
- Issue: Herve VII

Herve VI of Léon, nicknamed the Young, (died 1337) was the eldest son of Herve V, Lord of Léon.

== Life ==
As a Lord of Léon, his fief was the castle of La Roche-Maurice. He was undoubtedly the instigator of his sister Isabella's marriage with William of Harcourt, who owned lands about thirty kilometers from Noyon-sur-Andelle, an estate belonging to the Lords of Léon.

In 1323 he also inherited the lands of his paternal aunt Amicia, wife of William of La Roche-Moisan. In 1327 he used these lands for the dowry of his daughter Joanna, widow of Oliver II, Viscount of Rohan.

=== Franco-Flemish War ===
In c. 1302 before his father's death, Herve accompanied him during the Franco-Flemish War. After Harvey V's death, he is said to have taken part to the Battle of Mons-en-Pévèle, which Philip IV of France won with difficulty. He fought the Flemish again under Philip V in 1318 and Philip VI in 1328.

=== Benefactor ===
Herve VI was a benefactor of several abbeys, such as the Abbey of Daoulas, which had been founded by his ancestors. He ordered the construction of the altars of Saint Giles and Lupus in the priory of "Goelet Forest".

=== Marriage and issue ===
Harvey VI married Joanna, eldest daughter of Erard of Montmorency. They had four children:

- Harvey VII, who succeeded his father;
- Erard, Lord of Frémerville, who fought with his eldest brother during the War of the Breton Succession and managed the possessions of his under-age nephew, Harvey VIII;
- Joanna, who married Oliver II, Viscount of Rohan, then John I of Rougé, Lord of Derval;
- Maud, who married Harvey of Pont-l'Abbé, a.k.a. Harvey du Pont, who died on 29 September 1364 at the Battle of Auray with Charles of Blois;
- Amice, who married firstly Oliver of Tinténiac in 1343 and secondly Guillaume du Chastellier.

== Sources ==
- Chaillou, Léa. The House of Léon: Genealogy and Origins. Foundations: The Journal of the Foundation for Medieval Genealogy, volume 11, 2019, pp. 19–48 ISSN 1479-5078
- Patrick Kernévez & Frédéric Morvan Généalogie des Hervé de Léon (vers 1180-1363). Bulletin de la Société archéologique du Finistère, 2002, p. 279-312.
