= Harvey III, Lord of Léon =

Herve III, Lord of Léon
- Breton Lord and Knight
- Coat of Arms Léon Family
- Died: 1240
- Spouse: Margaret de Châteauneuf

Herve III, Lord of Léon was the son of Herve II of Léon and his first wife Anne of Hennebont.

== Life ==
Herve became Lord of Léon after his father's death around 1218. His fief was the castle of La Roche-Maurice.

=== Marriage and issue ===
Herve married Margaret de Châteauneuf, a younger daughter of Hugh IV de Châteauneuf, Lord of Châteauneuf-en-Thymerais, and Eleanor of Dreux, a sister of Peter Mauclerc, Duke of Brittany jure uxoris. After her elder brother's death, Margaret inherited one third of the Lordships of Châteauneuf, including the castles of Châteauneuf and Senonches. Harvey was also Lord of Noyon-sur-Andelle.

Harvey III and Margaret had:

- Harvey IV, who succeeded his father as Lord of Léon and Noyon-sur-Andelle, and his mother as Lord of Châteauneuf;
- Alan of Léon, whose son Francis is said to have married the heiress of the Kermavan family;
- Catherine of Léon, who married Juhel of Avaugour, younger son of Henry II, Lord of Avaugour and Margaret of Mayenne.
- Constance, lady of Tremazan, married Bertrand of Chastel

=== Death ===
Herve died in 1241 and was buried in the Abbaye Notre-Dame de Daoulas.

== Sources ==
- Morvan, Frederic (2009). La Chevalerie bretonne et la formation de l'armee ducale, 1260-1341 (in French). Presses Universitaires de Rennes.
- Chaillou, Léa. The House of Léon: Genealogy and Origins. Foundations: The Journal of the Foundation for Medieval Genealogy, volume 11, 2019, pp. 19–48 ISSN 1479-5078
- Patrick Kernévez and Frédéric Morvan Généalogie des Hervé de Léon (vers 1180-1363). Bulletin de la Société archéologique du Finistère, 2002, p 279-312.
