= Narcisse Henri François Desportes =

French botanist

- Born: 12 December 1776; Champrond, France
- Died: 7 June 1856 (aged 79)
- Occupations: botanist and bibliographer
- Known for: author of bibliographies associated with the departments of Sarthe and Mayenne
- Notable work: Roses cultivées en France, au nombre de 2562 espèces ou variétés, avec la synonymie française et latine

Narcisse Henri François Desportes (12 December 1776 – 7 June 1856) was a French botanist and bibliographer who was a native of Champrond.

He worked as an auditor to Jean-Baptiste de Lamarck at the Muséum national d'histoire naturelle in Paris, and became curator of the Musée d'histoire naturelle in Le Mans. He was the author of bibliographies associated with the departments of Sarthe and Mayenne.

In 1829 Desportes identified 2562 species and varieties of rose known to exist in France, of which he catalogued in a work titled Roses cultivées en France, au nombre de 2562 espèces ou variétés, avec la synonymie française et latine.

== Publications ==
- Roses cultivées en France, au nombre de 2562 espèces ou variétés, avec la synonymie française et latine. Paris : Mme Huzard; Le Mans : Pesche, 1829, XVII-124 p. Le faux-titre porte : Rosetum gallicum, ou Énumération méthodique des espèces et variétés du genre rosier, indigènes en France ou cultivées dans les jardins...
- Biographie et bibliographie du Maine et du département de la Sarthe, faisant suite au Dictionnaire statistique du même département. Le Mans : Monnoyer, 1828, 2 parties en 1 vol. in-8 ̊
- Description topographique et hydrographique du diocèse du Mans.... Le Mans : Pesche aîné, 1831, in-16, 119 p.
- Description topographique et industrielle du diocèse du Mans, suivie du Guide du voyageur dans la Sarthe, la Mayenne et départements limitrophes,... 2e édition de l'ouvrage précédent, Le Mans : Pesche, 1838, in-16, VIII-140 p.
- Flore de la Sarthe et de la Mayenne, disposée d'après la méthode naturelle, avec l'indication des propriétés médicales des plantes et leur usage dans les arts, ... Le Mans : C. Richelet, 1838, in-8 ̊, LX-528 p.
- Bibliographie du Maine, précédée de la description... du diocèse du Mans, Sarthe et Mayenne. Le Mans : Pesche, 1844, in-8 ̊, VIII-528 p.
- Tableau méthodique et synonymique des fraisiers cultivés. Le Mans : impr. de Julien, Lanier et Cie, 1854, in-8 ̊, 28 p., extrait du Bulletin de la Société d'horticulture de la Sarthe
