= Harvey V, Lord of Léon =

Herve V, Lord of Léon
- Breton Lord and Knight
- Coat of Arms Léon Family
- Died: 1304
- Spouse: Joan of Rohan
- Issue: Harvey VI

Herve V of Léon was the eldest son of Herve IV of Léon and his wife Maud of Poissy.

== Life ==
After his father's death in c. 1290, Herve became Lord of Léon. His fief was the castle of La Roche-Maurice. He died in April 1304.

== Issue ==
Herve V married Joan of Rohan. They had:

- Herve VI, who succeeded his father;
- William I, Lord of Hacqueville, who married Catherine, daughter of Odo, Lord of La Roche-Bernard, in 1301;
- Amicia, who married Catherine's brother Bernard, Lord of La Roche-Bernard c. 1301
- Isabella, who married William of Harcourt, Lord of Saussaye, an estate located about thirty kilometers from Noyon-sur-Andelle, possession of the House of Léon;
- Guy, whose existence is disputed and who is said to be a Bishop of Léon and a defender of the town of Hennebont in 1342 during the War of the Breton Succession;
- Raoul, whose existence is also disputed and who is said to be the ancestor of the Languéouez family;
- Oliver, Lord of Caudan, whose existence is disputed and who was more probably a son of William of Léon and Catherine of La Roche-Bernard.

== Bibliographie ==
- Morvan, Frederic (2009). La Chevalerie bretonne et la formation de l'armee ducale, 1260-1341 (in French). Presses Universitaires de Rennes.
- Chaillou, Léa. The House of Léon: Genealogy and Origins. Foundations: The Journal of the Foundation for Medieval Genealogy, volume 11, 2019, pp. 19–48 ISSN 1479-5078
- Patrick Kernévez and Frédéric Morvan, Généalogie des Hervé de Léon (vers 1180-1363). Bulletin de la Société archéologique du Finistère, 2002, p 279-312.
