= Harvey IV, Lord of Léon =

Herve IV, Lord of Léon
- Breton Lord and Knight
- Coat of Arms Léon Family
- Died: 1290
- Spouse: Maud of Poissy
- Issue: Herve V

Herve IV of Léon was the eldest son of Harvey III of Léon and his wife, Margaret of Châteauneuf.

== Life ==
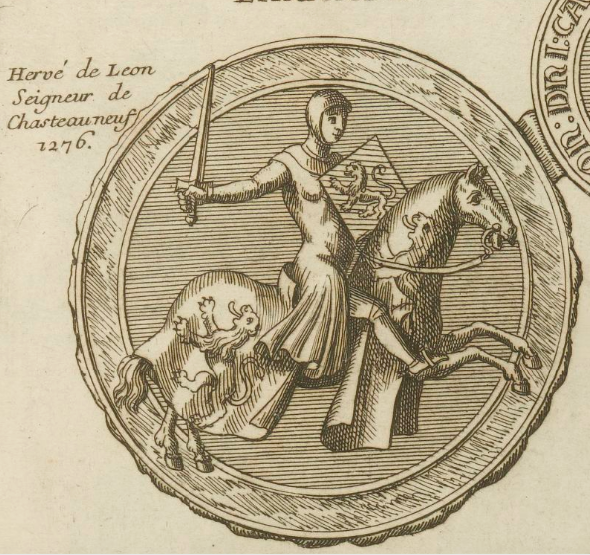
Herve IV's seal, from dom Morice’s History of Brittany.

=== Guardianship ===
After his father’s death in 1240, Herve, who was still a minor, became Lord of Léon. His fief was the castle of La Roche-Maurice. As Harvey IV was still a minor when his father died, the Lordship of Léon was ruled directly by the Duke of Brittany, John I the Red.

=== French Lands ===
Herve seems to have lived in France, where he married Maud of Poissy, daughter and heiress of William of Poissy and his wife Isabella of Marly, and used the title Lord of Châteauneuf, which he had inherited from his mother Margaret of Châteauneuf, until 1260. At this date, Harvey acknowledged John I's authority and paid him homage.

In September 1281, he gave all his properties in Châteauneuf and Senonches to King Philip III the Bold. This part of Herve’s inheritance then passed to Louis of Valois, Count of Chartres and Alençon (younger son of Charles I, Count of Valois, Alençon and Perche; brother of Philip IV the Fair), who was granted Châteauneuf-en-Thymerais. Louis died without issue in 1328/29 and King Philip VI gave a part of Louis’ inheritance to his younger son Charles II of Valois, Count of Alençon and Perche, granting him Châteauneuf-en-Thimerais and Senonches, as well as Champrond, among other lands, in a charter dated May 1335.

=== Marriage and issue ===
Herve IV and his wife Maud of Poissy had:

- Harvey V, who succeeded his father;
- William of Léon
- Amicia of Léon, who married William of La Roche-Moysan

=== Death ===
Herve died c. 1290 and was buried in the Abbaye Notre-Dame de Fontaine-Guérard in Normandy.

== Sources ==
- Morvan, Frederic (2009). La Chevalerie bretonne et la formation de l'armee ducale, 1260-1341 (in French). Presses Universitaires de Rennes.
- Chaillou, Léa. The House of Léon: Genealogy and Origins. Foundations: The Journal of the Foundation for Medieval Genealogy, volume 11, 2019, pp. 19–48 ISSN 1479-5078
- Patrick Kernévez and Frédéric Morvan, Généalogie des Hervé de Léon (vers 1180-1363). Bulletin de la Société archéologique du Finistère, 2002, p 279–312.
