= Guigemar =

Breton lai

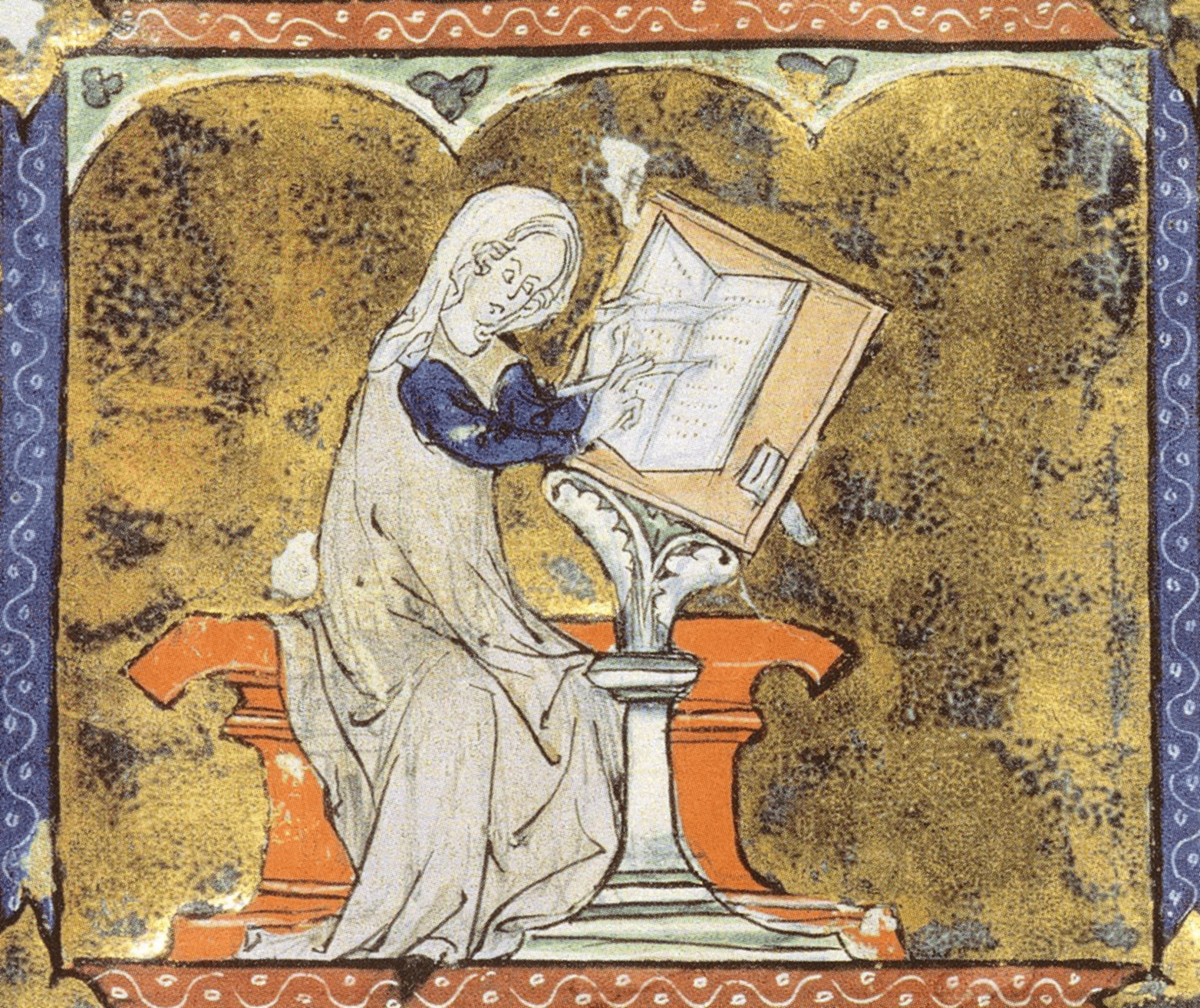
Marie de France, from an illuminated manuscript in Bibliothèque nationale de France

"Guigemar" is a Breton lai, a type of narrative poem, written by Marie de France during the 12th century. The poem belongs to the collection known as The Lais of Marie de France. Like the other lais in the collection, Guigemar is written in the Anglo-Norman language, a dialect of Old French, in rhyming octosyllabic couplets.

"Guigemar" is one of the works in which the author explicitly gives her name as "Marie." In the prologue of this lai, she proclaims two goals for her work: to give rightful praise to people who have earned it, despite what envious rivals may have said; and to present the stories behind certain songs that were well known at the time. It has been suggested that the prologue to "Guigemar" predates the overall prologue to the Lais in the Harley 978 manuscript, the only manuscript that records all twelve of Marie's known lais.

== Plot ==
Guigemar, son of a loyal vassal to the King of Brittany, is a courageous and wise knight, who despite his many qualities, has been unable to feel romantic love. One day, on a hunting expedition, he mortally wounds a white hind, but he is injured as well. Before dying, the hind speaks to him, leaving a curse that his wound can only be healed by a woman who will suffer for love of him, and he will suffer as much for her.

Guigemar wanders through the forest until he finds a river and a lavishly decorated boat with no crew. He boards it and lies down in pain. When he gets back up, he realises that the boat has left port and that he is unable to control where it takes him.

The boat takes him to a land where the lord has imprisoned his lady out of jealousy. The lady is permitted to see only two other people: a maiden who has become her confidante, and an elderly priest. The only part of her prison that is not walled off is a garden, surrounded by the sea. The magical boat carrying Guigemar docks near the garden. The lady and her maiden tend to the knight's wound and shelter him within their gilded cage. Guigemar and the lady fall in love almost immediately, but they are each uncertain if their feelings are mutual. The knight confides his feelings to the maiden, who arranges a secret meeting with her lady. Once the lady is convinced of the sincerity of Guigemar's motives, they consummate their love. Their year and a half of bliss is ended when the lord's chamberlain discovers them together. The lord forces Guigemar to return to his own country. As signs of their fidelity to one another, the lady ties a knot in his shirt that only she can untie without tearing or cutting, and he gives her a belt tied with a knot that only he can untie.

Guigemar is hailed as a hero in his own country, but he can only think of his distant love. Meanwhile, the lord imprisons his lady within a marble tower. After two years of captivity, she has become very depressed out of her longing for Guigemar. She manages to escape the tower and considers drowning herself in the nearby sea. She then spots the same mysterious ship that had carried Guigemar long ago, and she decides to board it. The ship brings her to Brittany, where she is taken captive by the Lord Mériaduc. He falls madly in love with her and tries to rape her, but the knot in the belt prevents his attempt.

Later on, Lord Mériaduc holds a jousting tournament, which Guigemar attends. Knowing that Guigemar wears a shirt with a knot that only his true love can untie, and that the lady wears a belt that only her true love can untie, Lord Mériaduc summons her to meet Guigemar, suspecting the two are connected. Guigemar does not recognize the lady; therefore, to test her identity, he allows her to try to untie the knotted shirt that she had given him years ago. Although she succeeds, Guigemar still refuses to accept her identity until she reveals the knotted belt. She then tells him of her sorrowful journey. Mériaduc attempts to keep the lady under his control, but Guigemar lays siege to his lands. Many people die on both sides of the conflict, but finally Guigemar prevails.

== Allusions and influence ==
The mural that decorates the queen's room shows Venus, the goddess of love, throwing Ovid's Remedia Amoris into a fire. This work by the Roman poet Ovid counsels readers how to avoid being swept away by love. According to French historians Patrick Kernévez and André-Yves Bourgès, the character Guigemar may be based upon Guihomar II, Viscount of Léon.

The chivalric romance Generides shows influence of this work, and indeed the scenes between the lovers appear to show deliberate imitation.

== See also ==
- Anglo-Norman literature
- Courtly love
- Medieval French literature
