= Harvey II, Lord of Léon =

Breton noble

Herve II, Lord of Léon
- Breton Lord and Knight
- Coat of Arms Léon Family
- Died: 1218
- Spouse: Anne of Hennebont,

Herve II of Léon was the son of Herve I, Lord of Léon, the founding member of the Lordship of Léon.

== Life ==
After his father's death, Harvey became Lord of Léon. His fief was the castle of La Roche-Maurice.

=== First Marriage and Issue ===
Harvey married Anne of Kemenet, heiress of part of the Kemenet-Héboé, that is to say two thirds of the old castle of Hennebont, the parishes of Inzinzac and Penquesten, most of Saint-Caradec and Caudan, half of Groix, one third of Plouay, Tréfaven en Ploemeur and several enclaves scattered in Arzano, Gestel and Lesbin, Quéven and Lanvaudan.

Herve II and Anne had a son:

- Harvey III, Lord of Léon (died in 1240)

=== Second Marriage ===
After Anne's death, he married a daughter of Morvan, Viscount of Le Faou.

=== Death ===
According to the necrology of the Abbaye Saint-Guénolé de Landévennec, Herve II died on 23 November in an unspecified year around 1218, while he was on his way back from the Fifth Crusade.

== Sources ==
- Morvan, Frederic (2009). La Chevalerie bretonne et la formation de l'armee ducale, 1260-1341 (in French). Presses Universitaires de Rennes.
- Patrick Kernévez et Frédéric Morvan Généalogie des Hervé de Léon (vers 1180-1363). Bulletin de la Société archéologique du Finistère, 2002, p. 279-312.
