= La Roche-Maurice Parish close =

Parish close located in Finistère, in France

Coordinates: 48.4731°N 4.2032°W

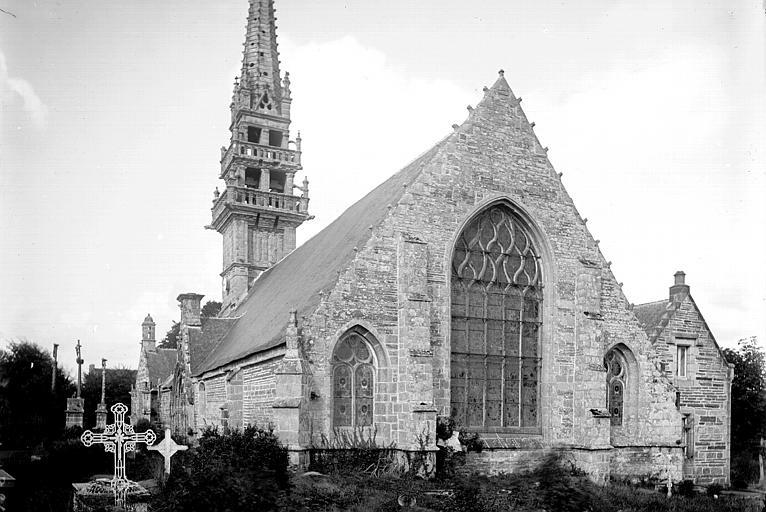
The church at La Roche-Maurice

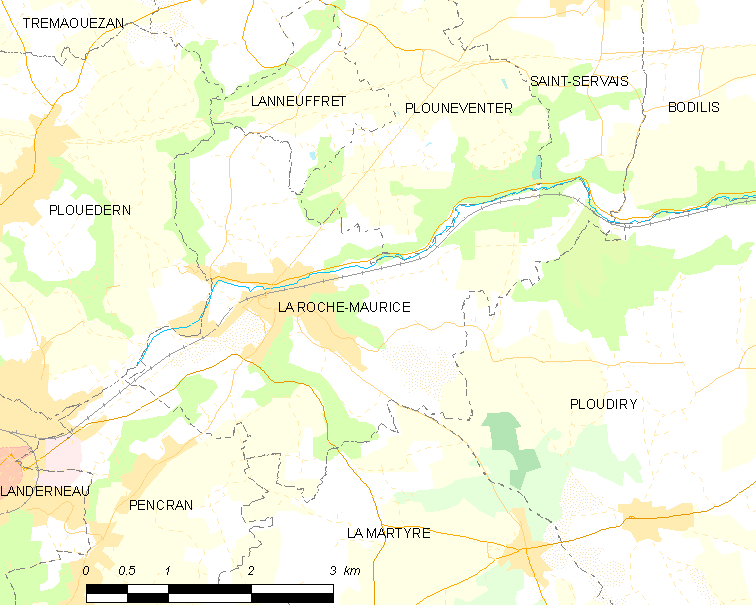
Map showing location La Roche-Maurice

The La Roche-Maurice Parish close (Enclos paroissial) is located at La Roche-Maurice in the arrondissement of Brest in Brittany in north-western France. The church and the funeral chapel are listed historical monuments since 1916. It was dedicated to St-Yves (patron saint of judges and lawyers). It was built in the 16th and 17th centuries.

== The Calvary ==
The calvary stands at the south entry to the enclos. It dates to around 1572 and is 7 metres high. The central cross carries the crucified Jesus and an unusual crosspiece is decorated at each end with an angel. The good and bad robbers hang from gibbets on each side of this central cross.

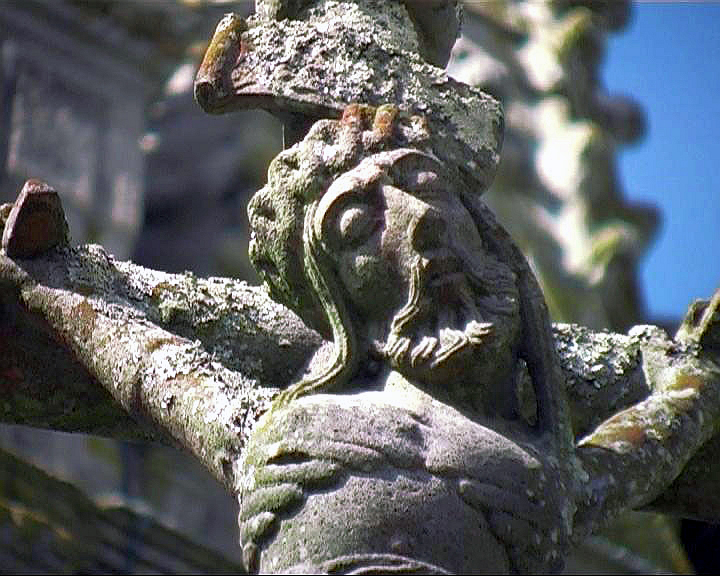
La Roche Maurice calvary. Head of Jesus

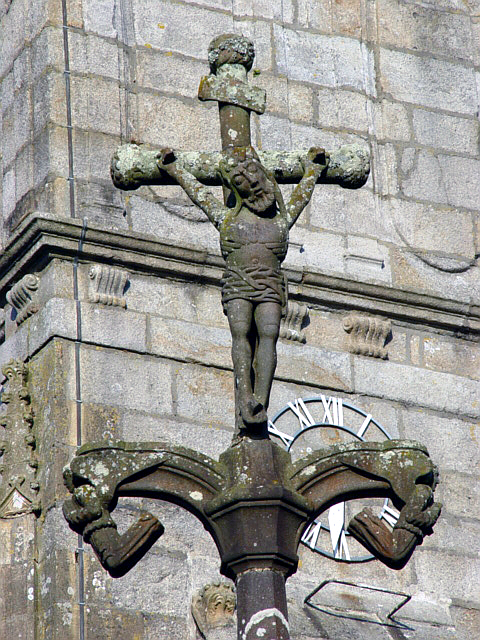
View of Jesus' cross

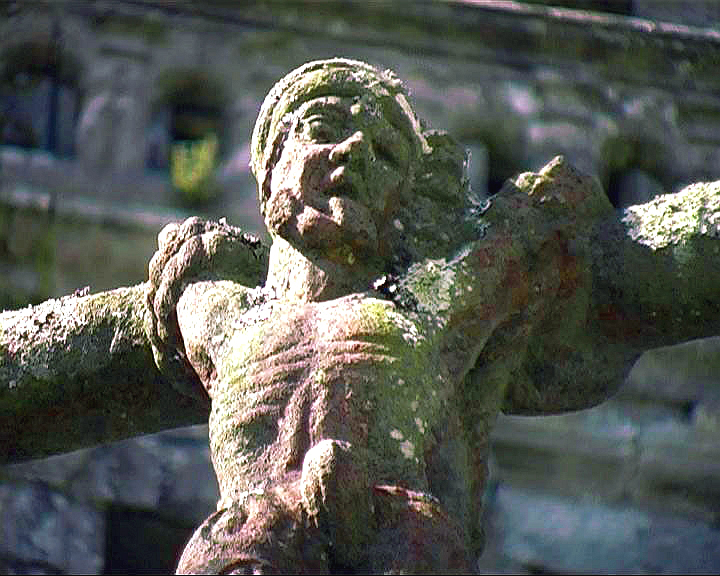
The bad robber hangs from a gibbet alongside the cross

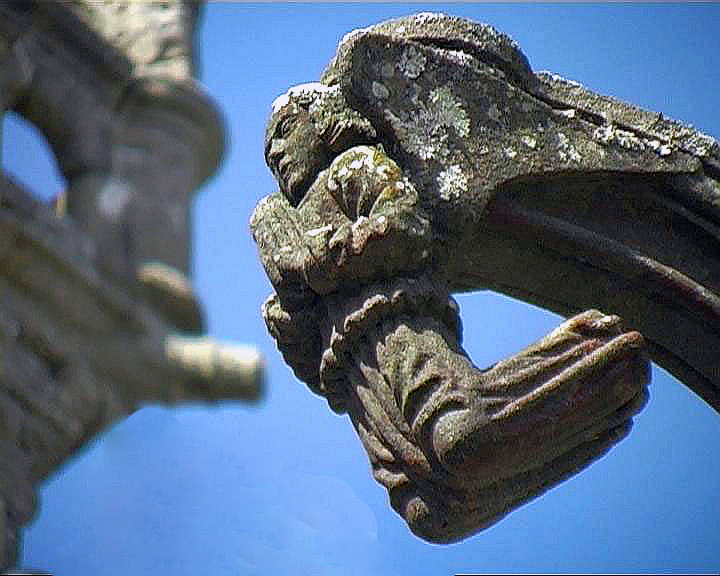
The angel on the La Roche Maurice calvary

== The ossuary ==
Built between 1639 and 1640 as the Saint Anne chapel, it has five windows on each side of the central entrance and above the door a triangular pediment carries the words "Rappelle-toi mon jugement, tel aussi sera le tien : à mon tour aujourd'hui, à ton tour demain" and the date 1639. On the façade seven carvings depict seven people from different levels of society and death is represented with the "Ankou", armed with an arrow and giving the chilling warning "I will kill you all" ("Je vous tue tous"). Another inscription of 1640 reminds us that we are of but dust ("Souviens-toi, homme que tu n'es que poussière"). It is built in a mixture of Logonna stone and schiste and in the Renaissance style.

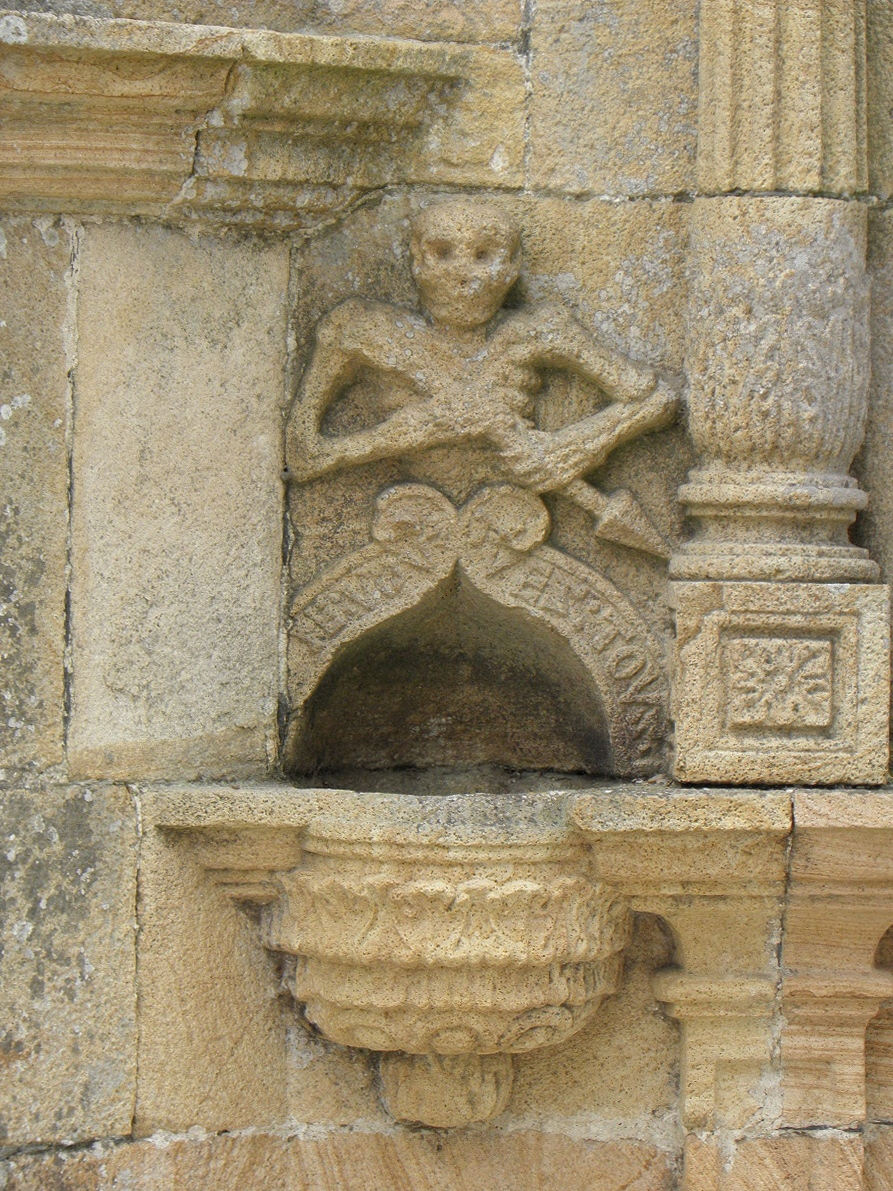
The Ankou

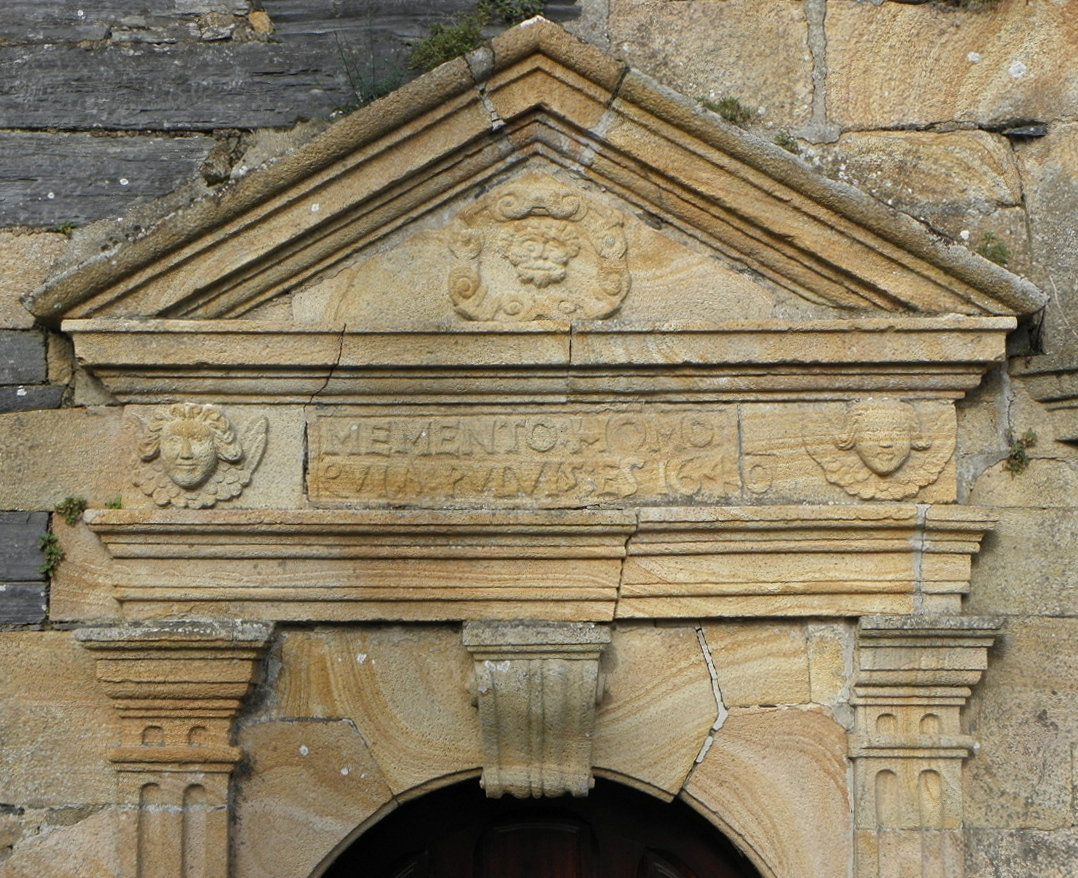
Pediment over ossuary entrance

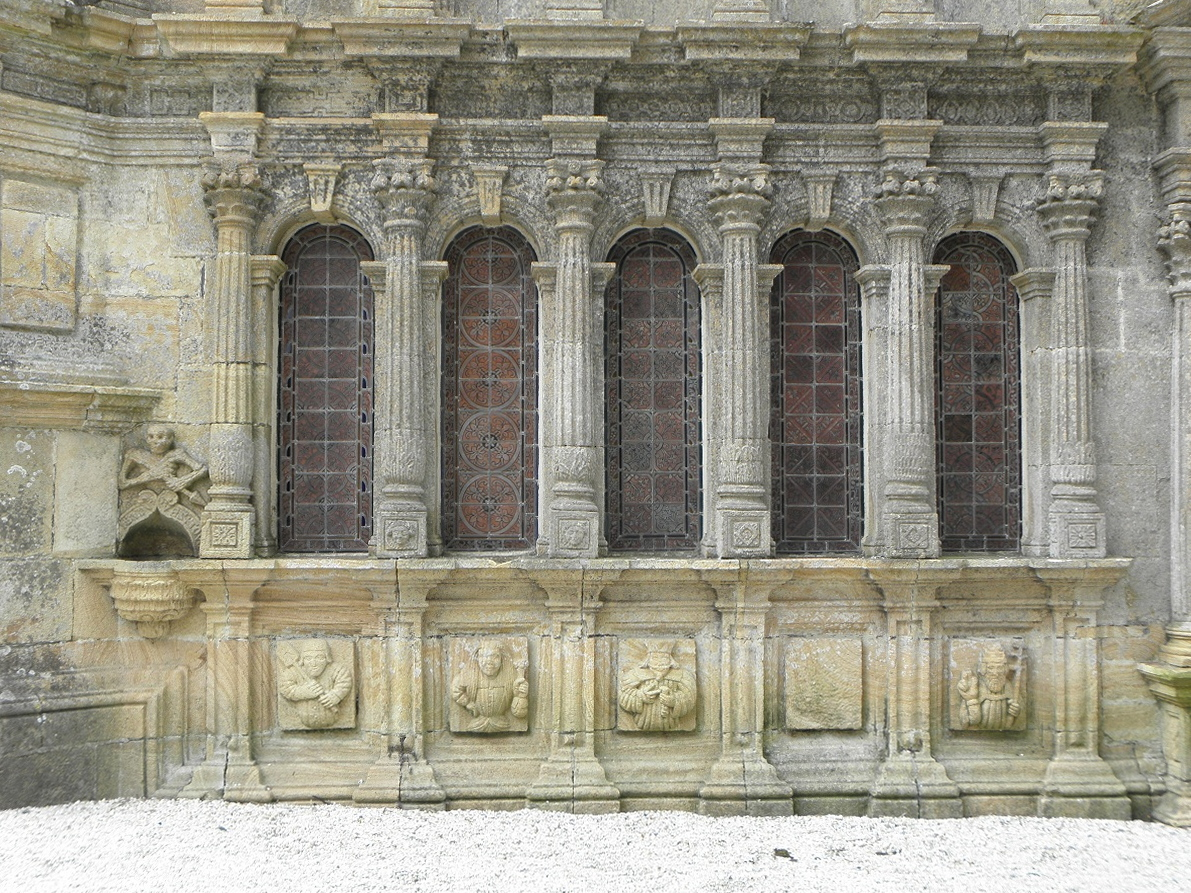
Five of the ossuary windows. Note stoup with "Ankou" on left and carvings below each window

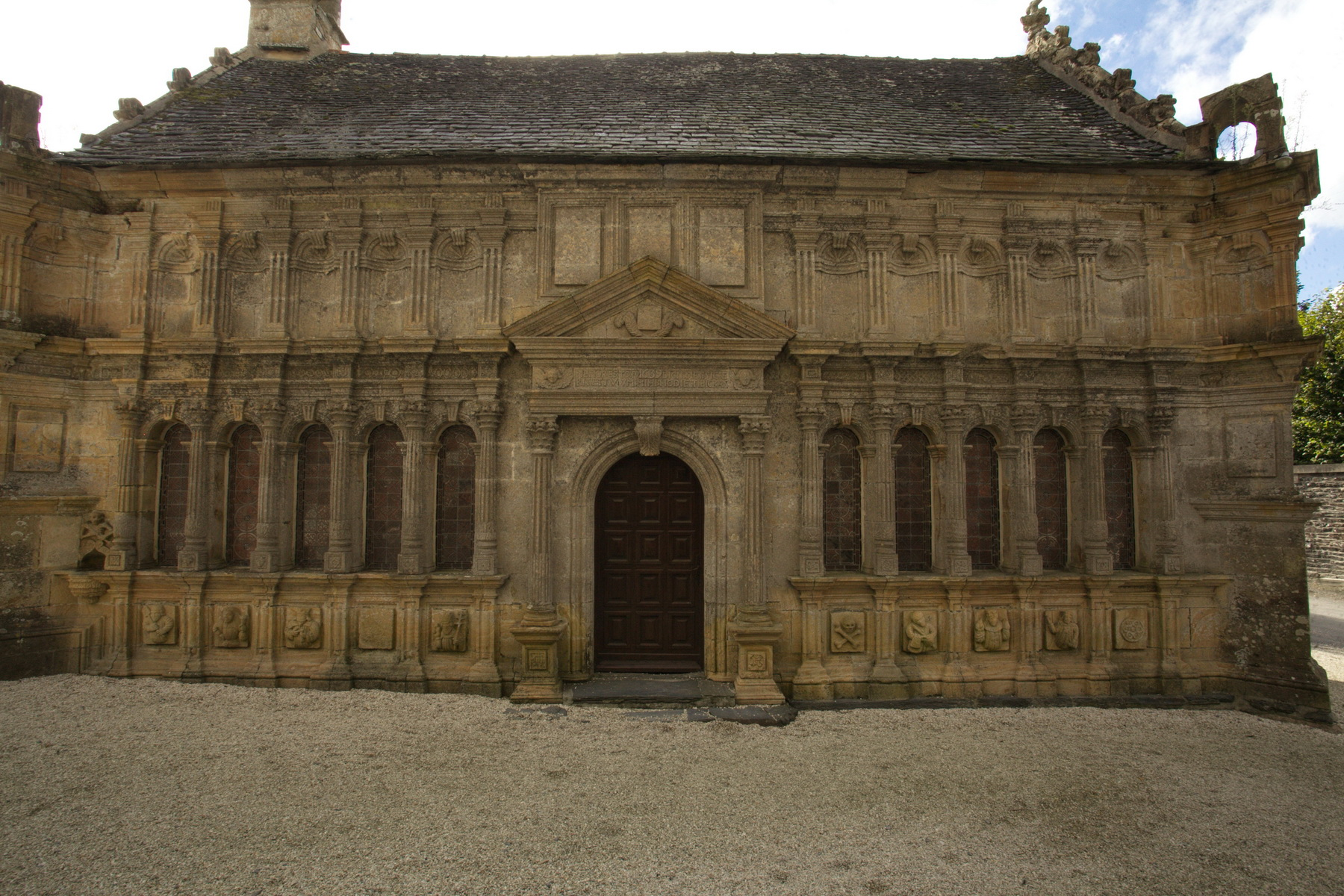
Full view of ossuary

== The church ==
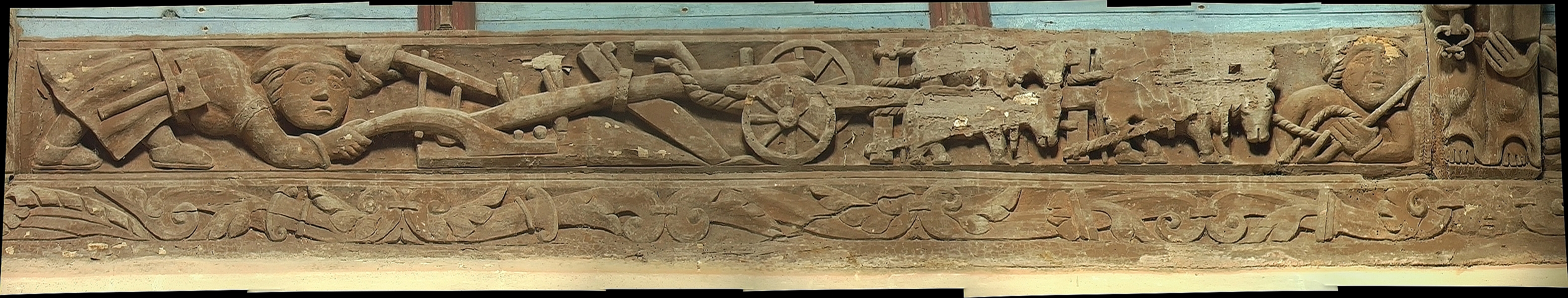
One of the church's magnificent sablieres

The church itself is dedicated to Saint Yves and was built between 1509 and 1589, replacing an older church dating back to 1363. The bell-tower is 60 metres high and has a doorway with niches in which are statues of Saints Yves, Pascal Baylon and Vincent Ferrier. The bell-tower has two bell chambers and is decorated with Gothic spires, gargoyles and Renaissance lanterns. The south porch dates to 1550 and has an elaborate stoup ("bénitier"). Behind the altar there is a large, stained glass window dating to 1539 and signed Laurent Sodec. It depicts fifteen scenes of the passion and resurrection. The paneled vaults have several sablières and decorated beams depicting scenes from daily life. The rood screen separating the choir from the nave is decorated with fauns and gorgons mixed with apostles and saints. Along the nave are niches with depictions of nine of the apostles and three popes and various figures including Saint Paul Aurélien and his dragon, Saint Augustin, Saint Blaise, Saint Michael fighting the dragon, Mary Magdalene with her pot of ointment, the resurrected Christ, Saint Catherine, Saint Barbara, Saint Apolline, Saint Dominic, Saint Giles, Saint Geneviève and Saint Marguerite. In the tympanum above the south porch there is a statue of Saint Maurice or Maudez. This is attributed to S. Coëtdeleu.

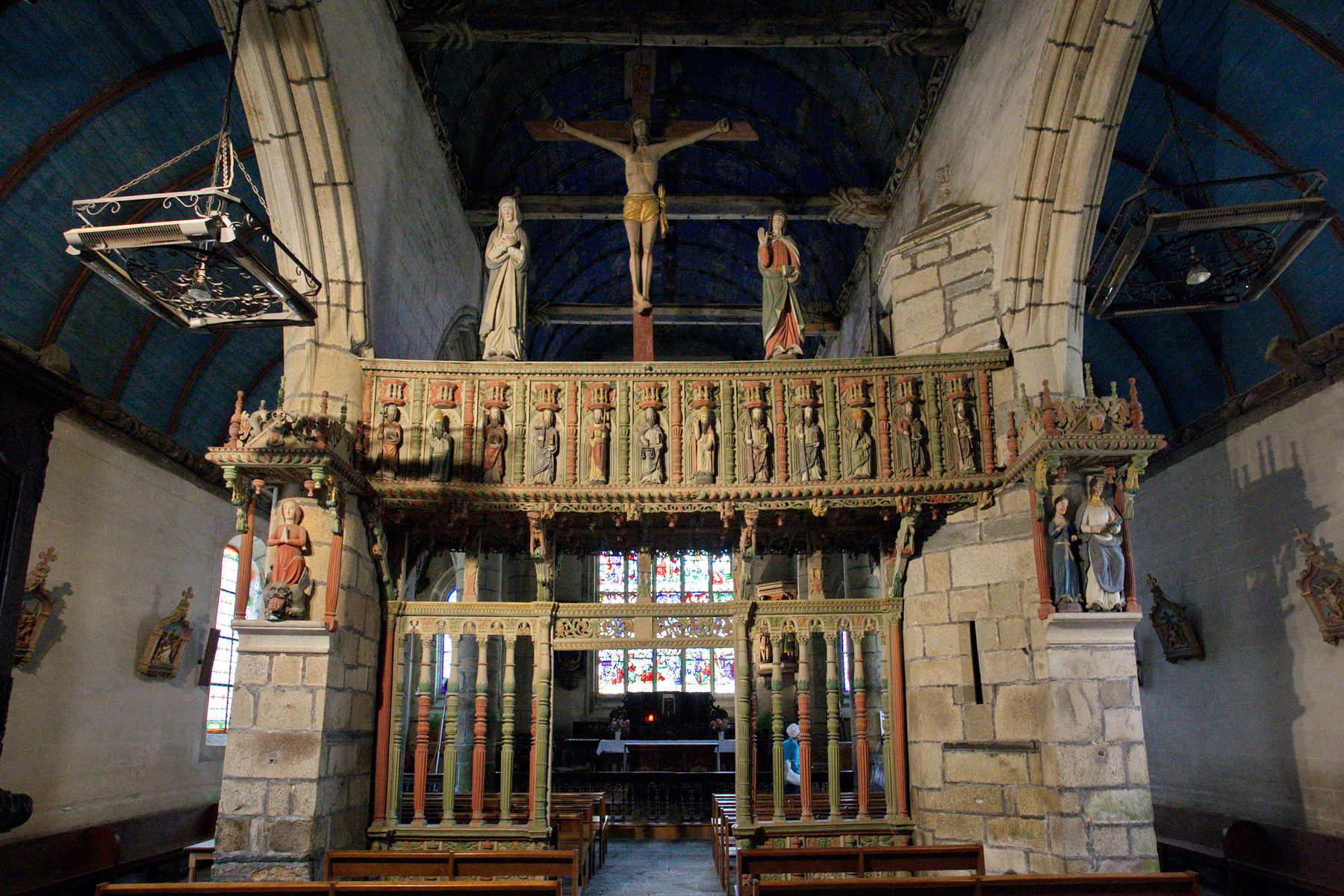
The rood screen

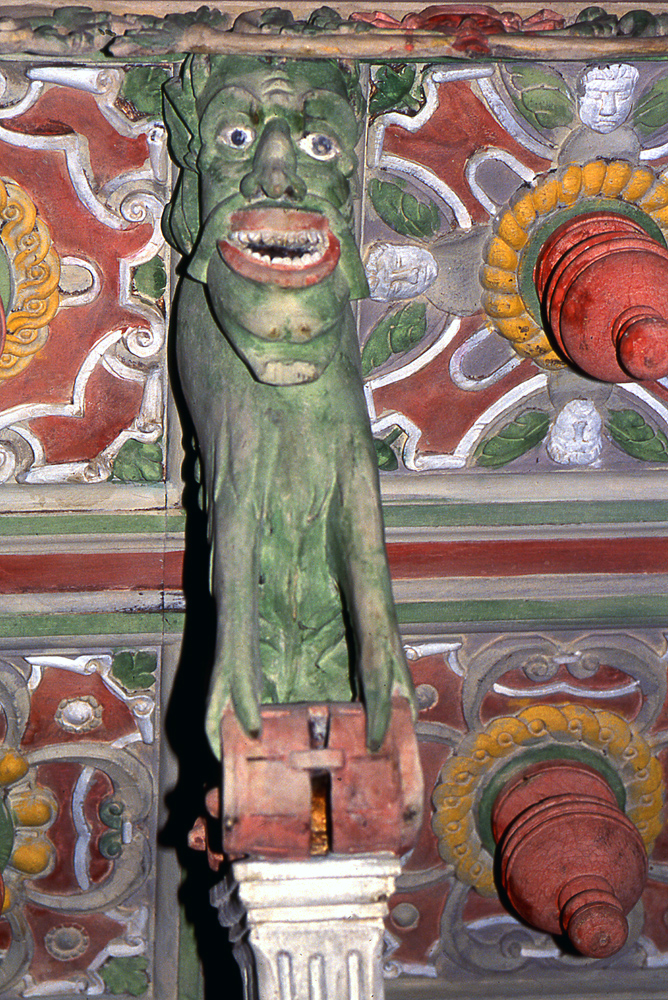
Carving on rood screen

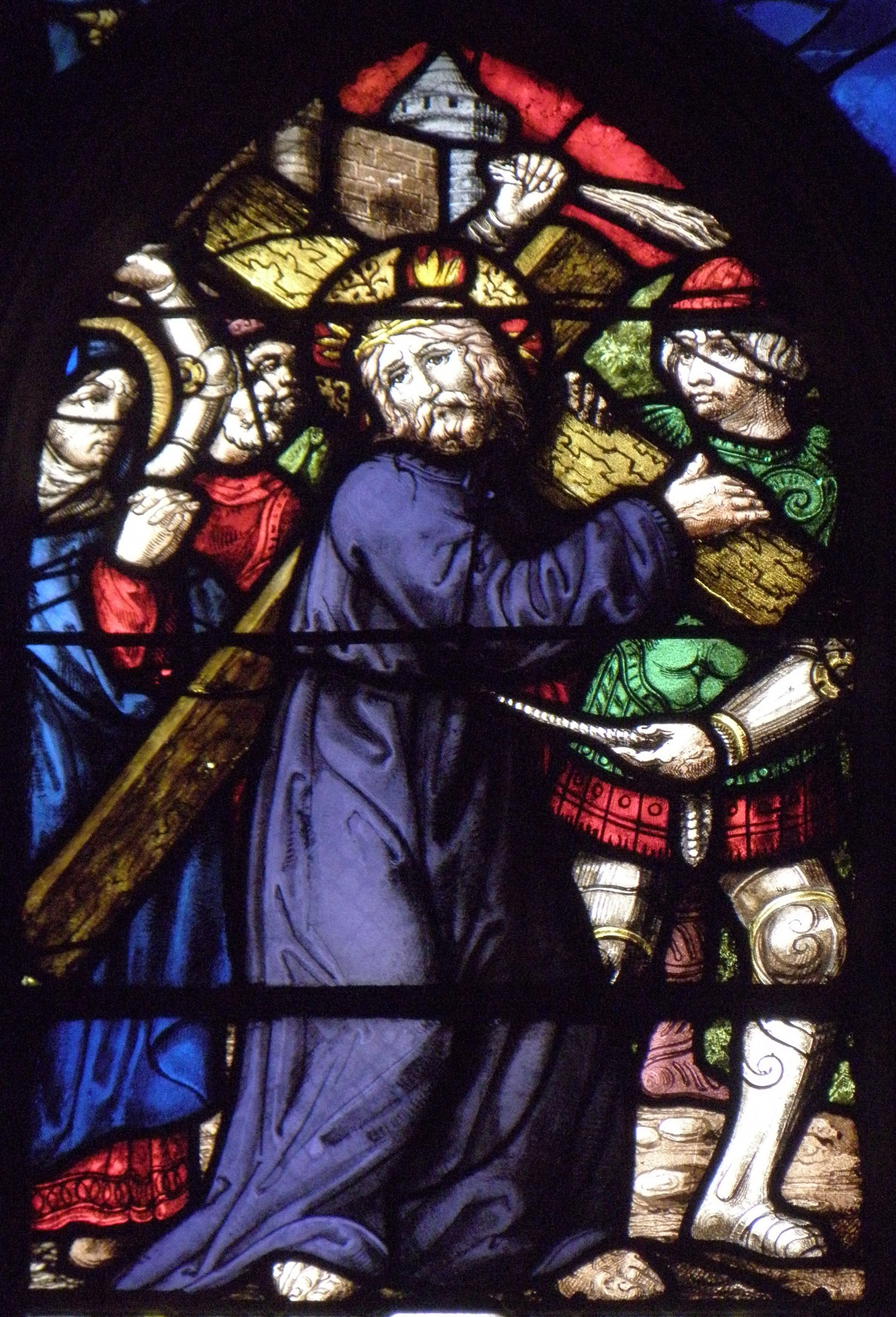
Part of stained glass window, Jesus carrying the cross

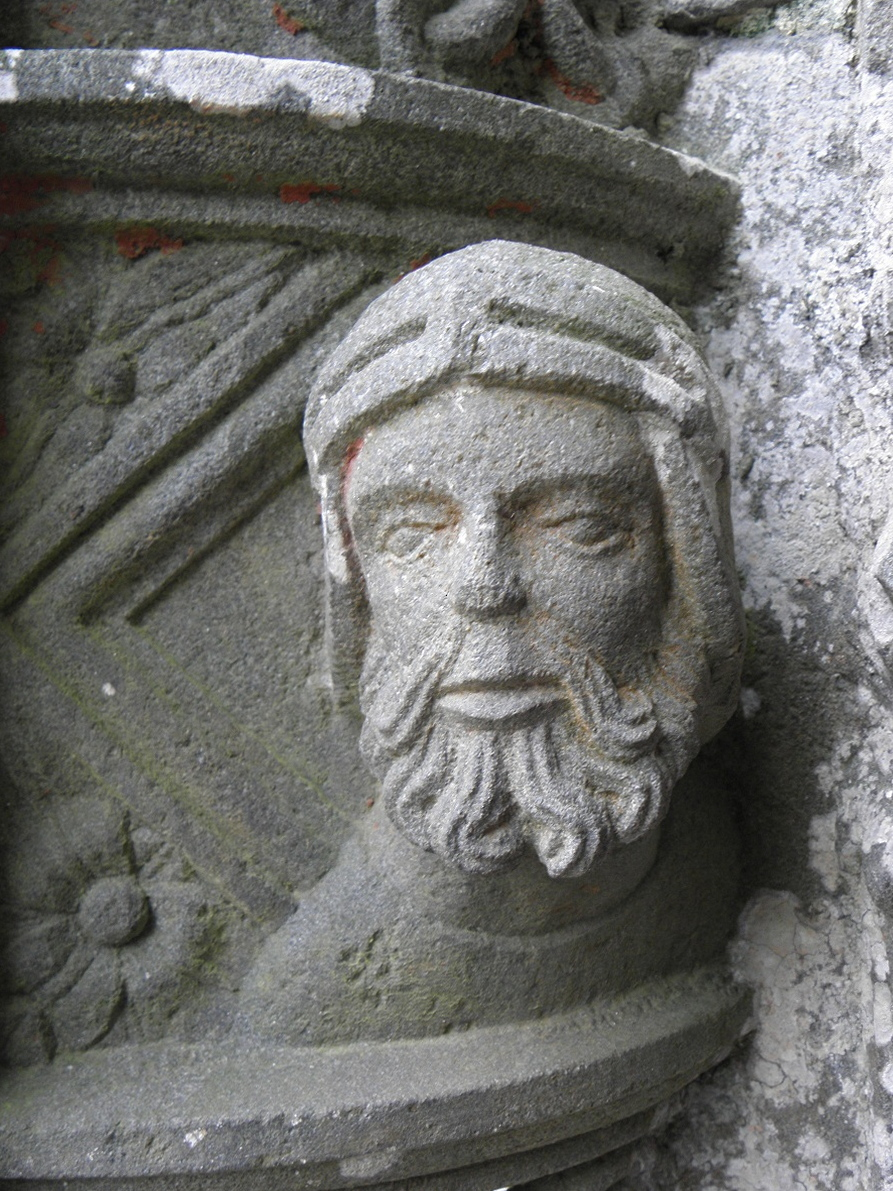
Carving on the stoup by south porch

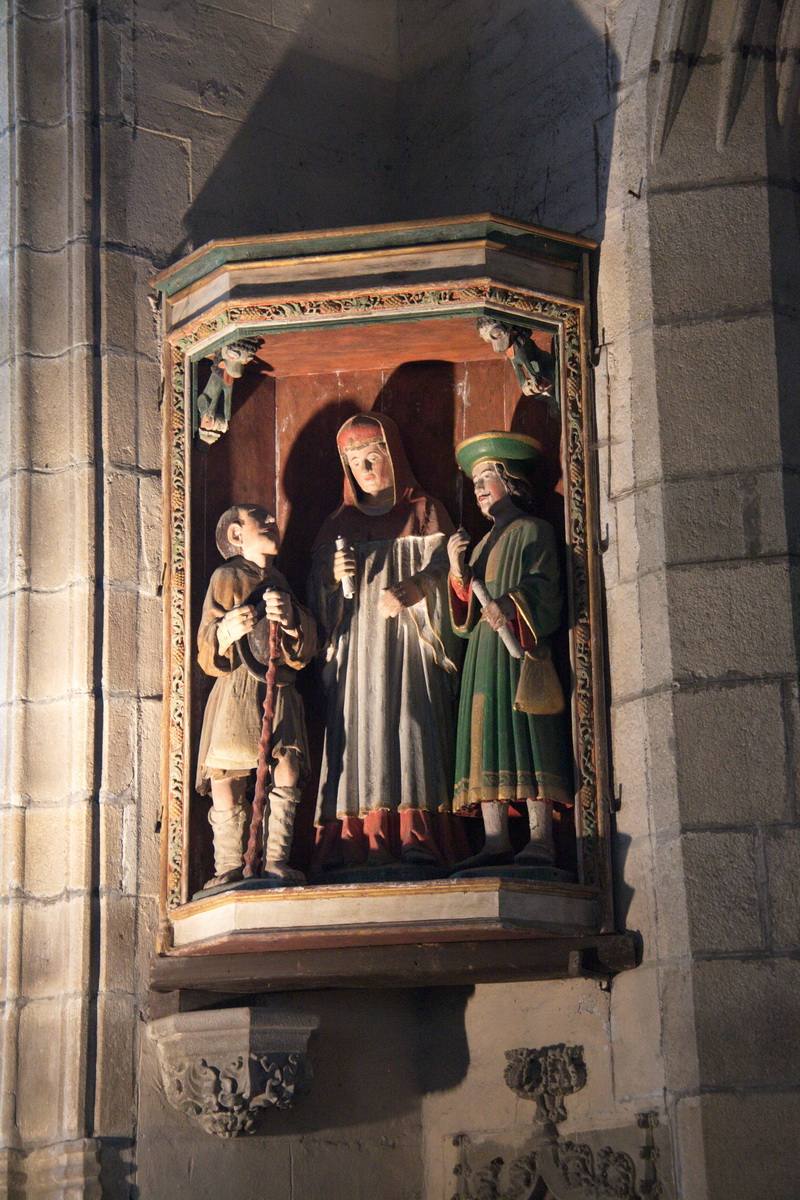
A statue in the church depicts Saint Yves making a judgement between a rich man and a poor man

== The main window ==
The stained glass window dates to 1539. The individual lancets depict: 1 –The entrance of Jesus into Jerusalem. 2 –The Last Supper. 3 –Jesus washes one of the disciples feet. 4 –In the Garden of Olives. 5 – Judas' kiss. 6 –Jesus before the High Priest. 7 –Jesus is ridiculed and hit. 8 –Jesus is whipped. 9 –Jesus is ridiculed as a king. 10 –"Ecce homo" 11 –Jesus before Pontius Pilate 12 –Jesus carries the cross 13 –The crucifixion between two robbers. 14 –Jesus' body is washed before burial. 15 –The resurrection.

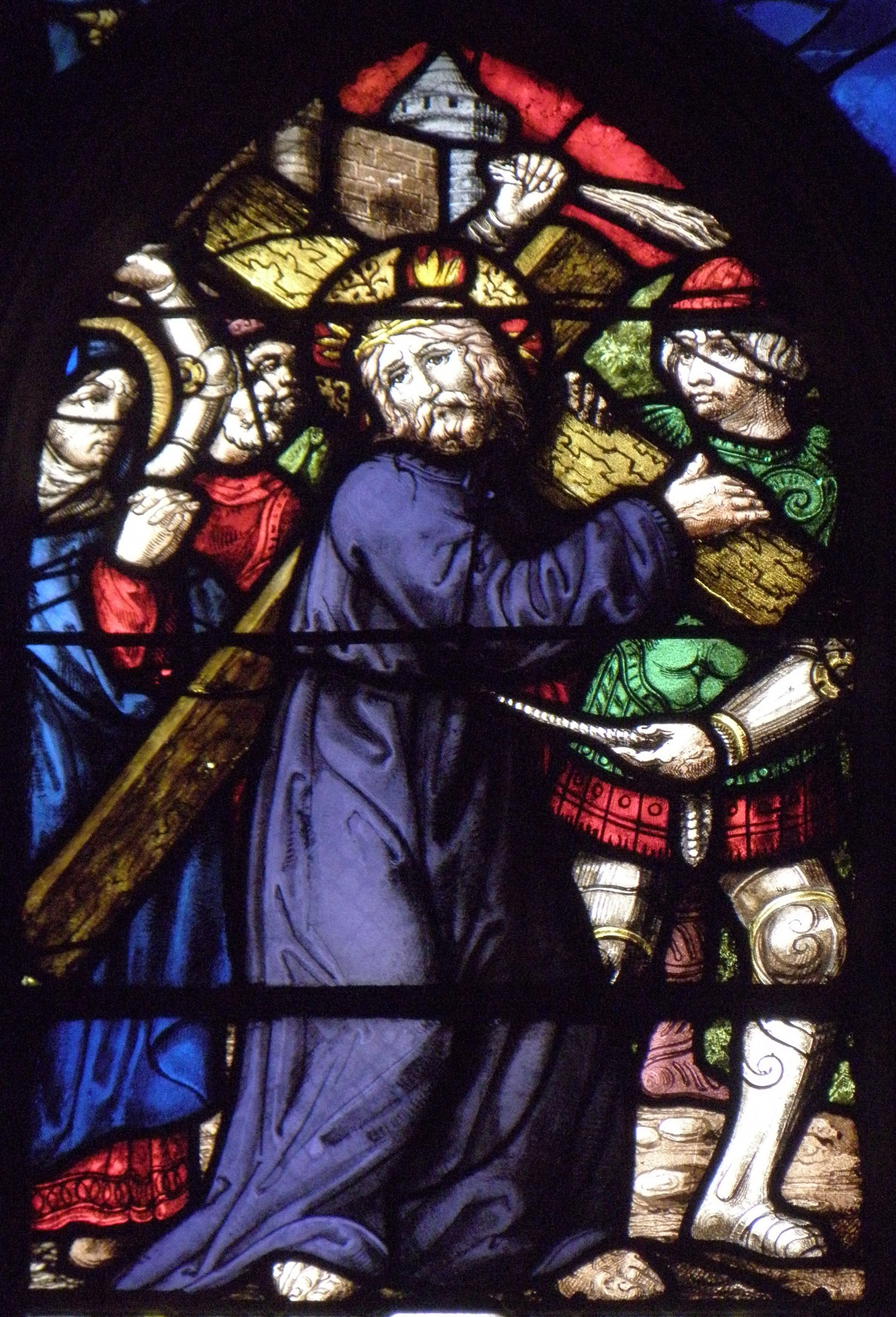
Jesus carries the cross.

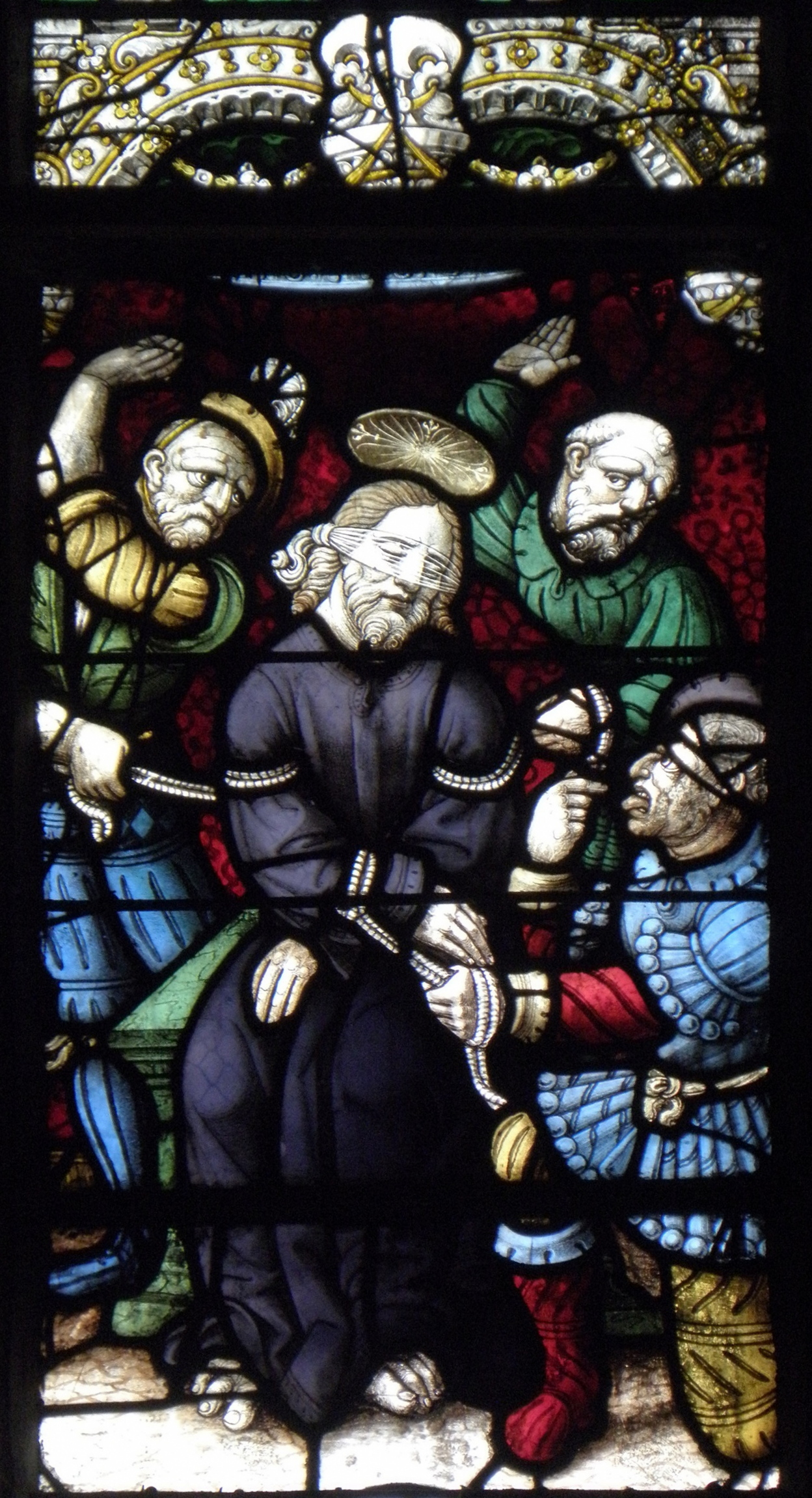
Jesus is mocked and ridiculed.

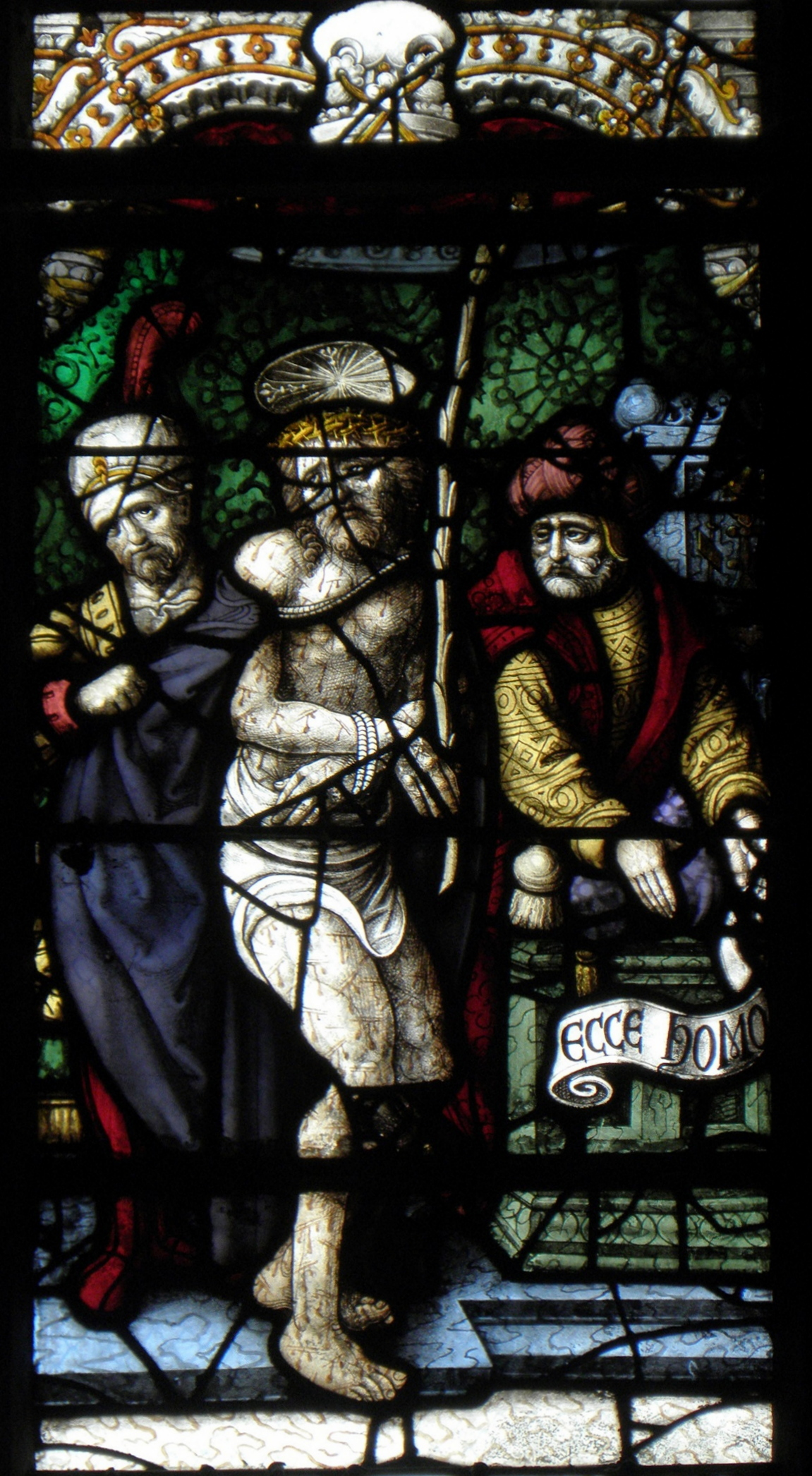
Ecce Homo.

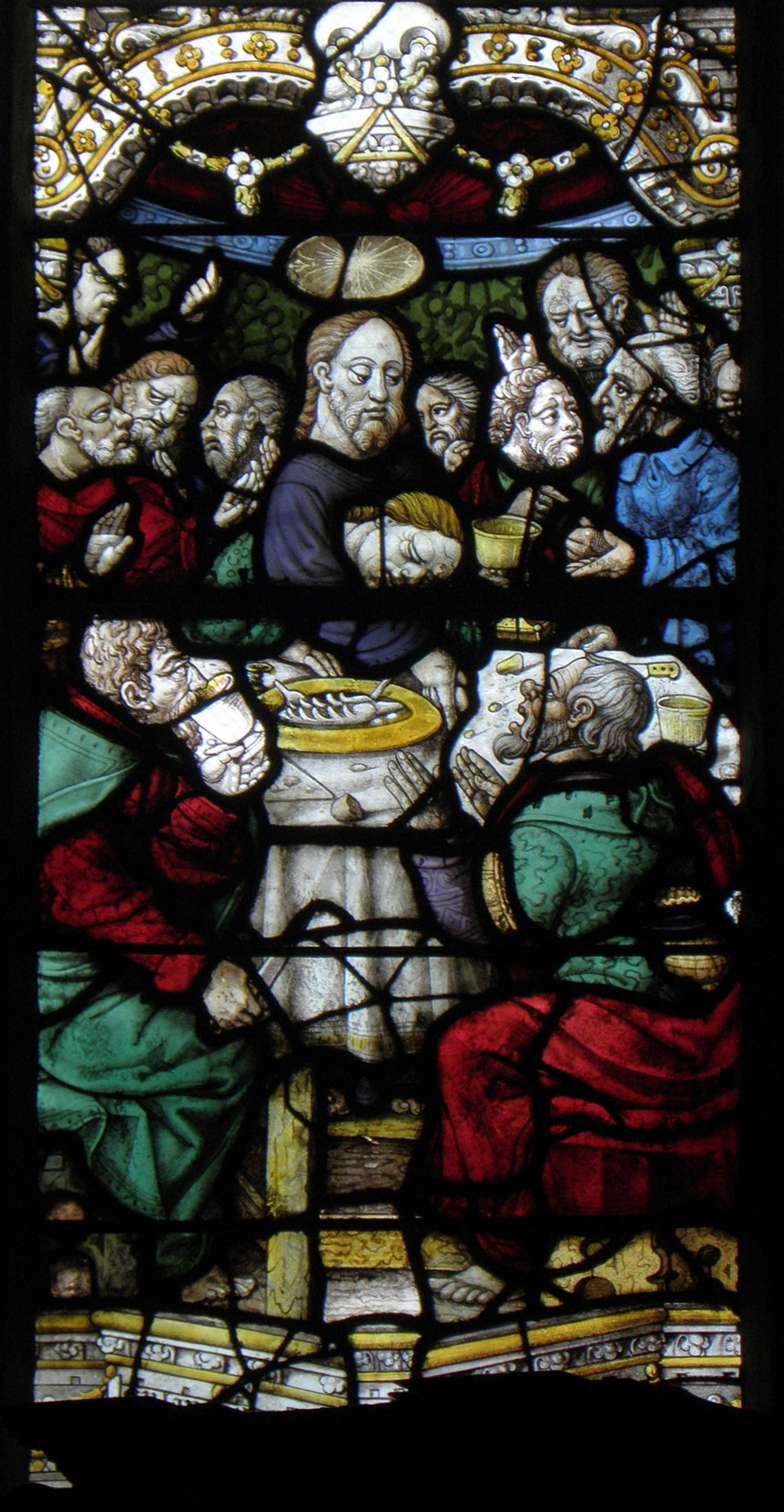
The Last Supper.

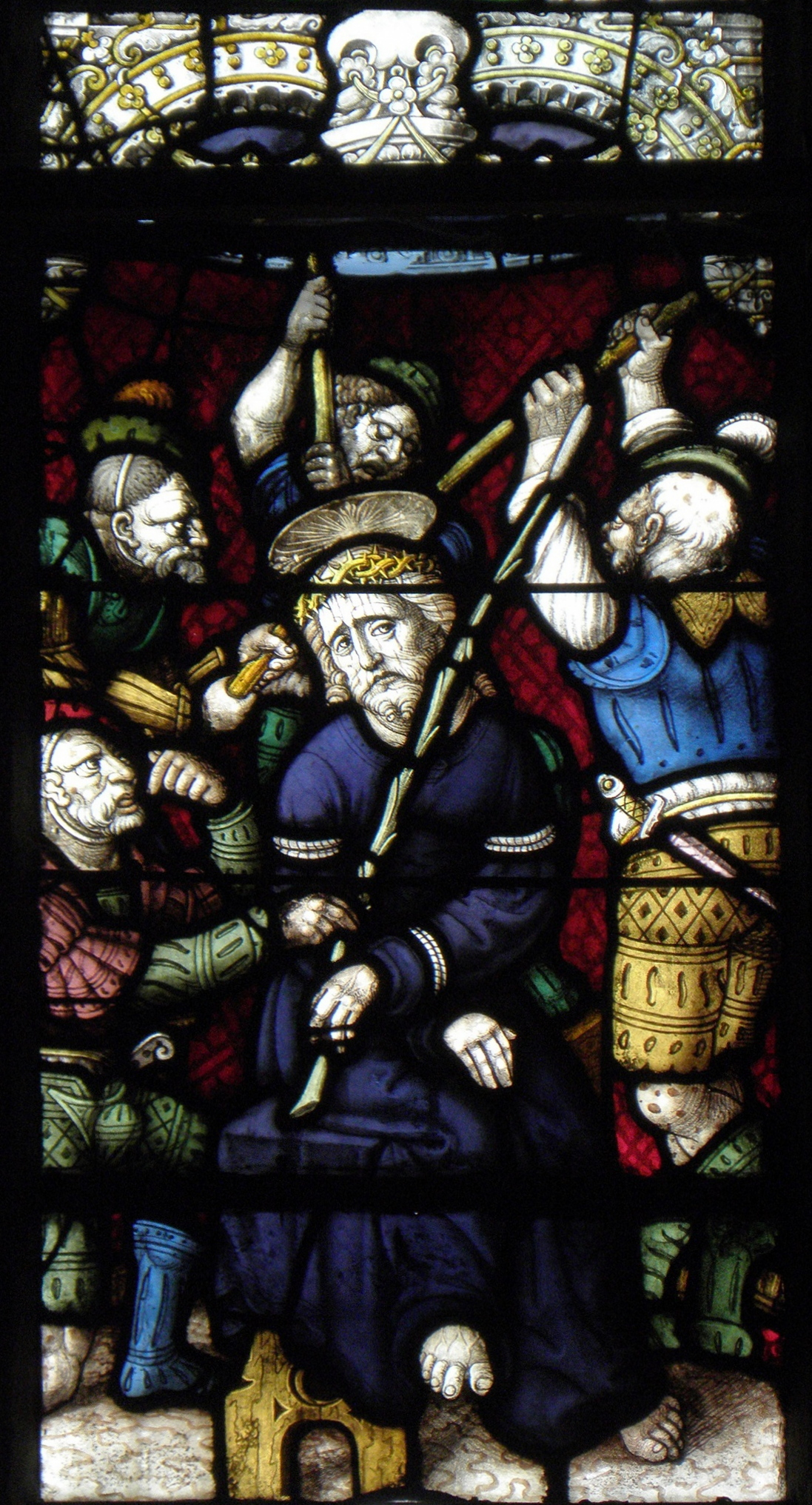
The crown of thorns is placed on Jesus' head.
