= Generides =

Generides or Generydes is an English verse romance, originating in the English Midlands and dated to the end of the 14th century. It survives in two different lengthy forms. The hero Generides is born as an illegitimate son of the King of India, and after adventures marries a princess of Persia and becomes ruler of both India and Persia.

The original, which may have been in Middle English or French, appears to have been a compilation of the fourteenth century. Despite the wide use of Eastern names and locations, these do not appear to have any particular significance, and though many analogues can (and have been) drawn between it and various Indian and Persian tales, the characters and episodes are familiar ones in medieval romances. As in the Breton lay Guigemar, a forced separation of lovers is accompanied by a magical device that will help with recognition once they meet up again. Also, as in Guigemar, a deer plays a prominent part near the beginning of the romance; in circumstances, though, more in keeping with Irish legends of the Sidhe. A deer leads the King of India to a hidden location in a forest where a maiden is waiting for him. They make love. As in the romance Erec, the king, the father of Generides, is woken the next morning by the lady's tears. While, as in Guigemar, the lover is identified by a trait of his garment, in Generides, the lady's tears can only be washed out by the lady herself, which suggests that the poet used a fairy tale of the type of Black Bull of Norroway; magical shirts are a commonplace, but only in this romance and that tale does the detail of the heroine's ability to wash clean the shirt appear. However, unlike other medieval English romances, for example Sir Eglamour of Artois, these and other 'mythological motifs' are not required for the logical unfolding of the story. It has more the feeling of an early modern novel. For example, there is no logical need at all for the magic shirt, since the lady is later accompanied by a forester in her search for Generides' father, a forester who knows the lady's intentions, who she is seeking, and is recognised at once by his former lord when he comes into his presence. Both former lovers recognise each other instantly when they meet.

== Editions ==
- Frederick James Furnivall (1865), A royal historie of the excellent knight Generides for the Roxburghe Club
- William Aldis Wright (1878), Generydes: a romance in seven-line stanzas for the Early English Text Society
