= Guihomar II of Léon =

Guihomar II de Léon (died in 1103) was a Viscount of Léon. He is said to have succeeded his grandfather Guihomar I.

== Origins ==
Guihomar is said to be the son of a man named Ehuarn. But according to Joëlle Quaghebeur, this Ehuarn was actually a "Viscount from Cornouaille", that is to say a Viscount of Le Faou. It seems that Guihomar II succeeded his supposed grandfather and namesake Guihomar I.

A charter of the Cartulary of Saint-Georges de Rennes also mentions a Guihomar, son of Alan, himself named son of Guihomar in another charter in the same cartulary.

Guihomar might then be the son of Ehuarn and a daughter or a granddaughter of Guihomar I.

Guihomar's death is mentioned in the Chronicon Britannicum. It is specified that Guihomar II was killed in 1103 by his own subjects.

=== Possible family tree ===
               Alan [I] of Léon
               │
               ├──> Guihomar I of Léon († after 1040)
               │    │
               │    ├──> Alan [II] († after 1060)
               │    │    │
               │    │    ├──> Guyomar († after 1050, before his father)
               │    │    │
               │    │    ├──> a daughter
               │    │    │    x Ehuarn, viscount of Cornouaille
               │    │    │    │
               │    │    │    └──> Guihomar II
               │    │    │
               │    │    └──> Emma/Anna
               │    │         x Odo I, Viscount of Porhoët
               │    └──> Alfred († after 1060)
               │
               └──> Alfred of Léon, Lord of Mordelles († after 1028)

== Issue ==
Guihomar II married Orven of Cornouaille. They may have had two children:

- Harvey who succeeded his father.

Harvey also had an illegitimate son with an unknown woman:

- Harvey.

== In literary works ==
Guihomar III of Léon may have inspired Guigemar, the hero of the Lai Guigemar by Marie de France: the story takes place in Brittany at the time of Hoilas (maybe Duke Hoël II); one of Hoilas' barons, Lord of Liun (Léon) has a daughter, Noguent, and a son, Guigemar (Guihomar).

== Sources ==
- Patrick Kernévez, André-Yves Bourgès. Généalogie des vicomtes de Léon (XIe, XIIe et XIIIe siècles). Bulletin de la Société archéologique du Finistère, volume CXXXVI, 2007, p. 157-188.
