= Guihomar III of Léon =

Guihomar III of Léon (c. 1087–1157) was a Viscount of Léon. He succeeded his father Harvey I.

== Life ==
Very few things are known about Guihomar III’s life.

His name appears firstly in the charter of foundation of the priory Saint-Martin of Morlaix made by his father in 1128.

He is also cited in the charter of the foundation of the priory of Saint-Melaine of Morlaix (c. 1145-1147) made by his son Harvey II, who mentions “pater meus G. vicecomes”.

== Issue ==
The name of Guihomar’s wife is not known. They had two sons :

- Harvey II who succeeded his father and married Sybilla, an illegitimate daughter of King Stephen.
- Guihomar, mentioned in 1164 with his son Josselin

== Sources ==
- Patrick Kernévez, André-Yves Bourgès Généalogie des vicomtes de Léon (XIe, XIIe et XIIIe siècles). Bulletin de la Société archéologique du Finistère, volume CXXXVI, 2007, p. 157-188.
