= Harvey II of Léon =

Breton nobleman

Harvey II (Breton: Hoarvei, French: Hervé, or Latin: Herveus; c. 1110 – 1168), also known as Hervey Brito or Hervey le Breton, was a Breton nobleman. He was the Earl of Wiltshire in England between 1140 and 1141. About 1157, he succeeded his father, Guihomar III, as the Viscount of Léon in Brittany.

== Earl of Wiltshire ==
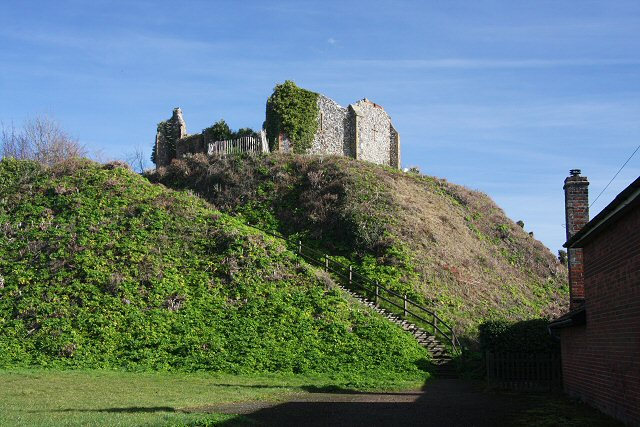
Eye Castle within the Honour of Eye

According to William of Malmesbury, Harvey declined an invitation from King Henry I of England (1100–35) to attend his court. However, he went to England to assist King Stephen in the war against Matilda. The Gesta Stephani describes Harvey as "a man of distinction and soldierly qualities". He was careful to state that he was going of his own free will and not out of compulsion or allegiance owed to the English king. Around 1139, in reward for his service to Stephen, who was at the time secure on his throne, Harvey received the hand in marriage of the king's illegitimate daughter Sybilla. He also received the Earldom of Wiltshire and the honour of Eye in Suffolk, which had been Stephen's before his accession.

As lord of Eye, Harvey seems to have had the ambition to turn its priory, which depended on the abbey of Notre-Dame de Bernay in Normandy, into an abbey. He issued a charter confirming the priory's liberties and listing his predecessors as lord of Eye. He confirmed that the priory owed 10,000 herrings to the abbey of Bernay every year, asserted his right to select the prior with the abbot's approval and also asserted his right to raise the priory to an abbey at any time. Whatever his long-term intentions were, he did not hold the honour long enough to see them through.

In 1140, Harvey somehow negotiated the surrender of Devizes Castle, preventing it from falling into the hands of Robert, Earl of Gloucester. In response, the king formally granted him Devizes so that he could better defend Wiltshire. From there, according to the Gesta Stephani, he fought "obstinate and unceasing warfare with the king's assailants." The following year, however, he was embarrassed when Devizes was overtaken by a mob of countrymen (comprovinciales) and he abandoned it to Matilda's men. As a result, his earldom was confiscated and he left England in disgrace. Matilda then appointed Patrick of Salisbury her earl in Wiltshire.

Harvey's wife probably followed him to Brittany. Likely because of her he held animosity towards the Plantagenet dynasty that succeeded Stephen on the throne.

== Viscount of Léon ==
About 1157, Harvey succeeded his father in Léon. He expanded his power and began styling himself "Count of Léon" (comes Leoniæ), but he struggled to maintain his de facto independence from his immediate overlord, the Duke of Brittany, and from the influence of the England.

In 1167 Harvey raised the standard of revolt with Eudo II, viscount of Porhoët, and Geoffrey IV, viscount of Thouars, with tacit support from King Louis VII of France. After an agreement with Louis, King Henry II of England led a campaign against Léon in August 1167. Harvey's son Guihomar was defeated and captured, and his major castles razed. Guihomar submitted and offered hostages. Harvey died soon after in 1168.

== Issue ==
Harvey and Sybilla had several children:

- Guihomar IV, who succeeded his father
- E. who has been identified as Elimarius, Abbot of Landevennec, or possibly Eudon or Evenus, Abbots of Saint-Mathieu
- Hamo, Bishop of Léon, murdered by his brother Guihomar in 1171

A mention dated 1169 indicates that Harvey had an illegitimate son:

- Harvey, who was the father of Gradlon, Budic and Guigon

== Sources ==
- Brown, V., ed. Eye Priory: Carultary and Charters. Part II. Boydell Press, 1994.
- Chaillou, Léa. The House of Léon: Genealogy and Origins. Foundations: The Journal of the Foundation for Medieval Genealogy, volume 11, 2019, pp. 19–48 ISSN 1479-5078
- Davies, R. H. C. King Stephen, 1135–1154. Berkeley and Los Angeles: University of California Press, 1967.
- Everard, J. A. Brittany and the Angevins: Province and Empire, 1158–1203. Cambridge: Cambridge University Press, 2000. ISBN 0-521-66071-8
- Green, J. A. The Aristocracy of Norman England. Cambridge: Cambridge University Press, 1997.
- Kernévez, Patrick, Bourgès, André-Yves. Généalogie des vicomtes de Léon (XIe, XIIe et XIIIe siècles). Bulletin de la Société archéologique du Finistère, volume CXXXVI, 2007, pp. 157–188
- Stringer, K. J. The Reign of Stephen: Kingship, Warfare and Government in Twelfth-Century England. London: Routledge, 1993.
- White, G. "Earls and Earldoms during King Stephen's Reign", at pp. 76–95 in D. E. S. Dunn, ed., War and Society in Medieval and Early Modern Britain. Liverpool University Press, 2000.
