= Harvey I, Lord of Léon =

Herve I, Lord of Léon
- Breton Lord and Knight
- Coat of Arms Léon Family
- Born: 1153
- Died: 1203 (aged 49–50)
- Spouse: Margaret of Rohan
- Father: Guihomar IV

Herve I of Léon (1153–21 July 1203) was the first Lord of Léon, the founding member of the junior branch of the Léon family.

== Life ==
Herve I was the second son of Guihomar IV, Viscount of Léon, and his wife Nobilis of Rennes.

=== The intervention of the Duke ===
When Guihomar IV died on 27 September 1179, Duke Geoffrey II of Brittany, seized the castellany of Lanmeur-Morlaix and integrated it into the ducal domain. Then, in order to weaken the House of Léon, he decided to divide its estates into two parts and gave Guihomar IV's second son Harvey, Daoudour and Landerneau, as well as a fief he had taken from the castellany of Saint-Renan which became known as "Viscounty of Coat-Méal"; he also gave Harvey the fiefs of the House of Léon in Cornouaille, that is to say the Lordships of Daoulas, Crozon, Porzai and Plouié. Herve and his successors styled themselves "Lord of Léon", being vassals of the eldest branch of the Viscounts of Léon.

=== Marriage and issue ===
Herve I married Margaret of Rohan, a daughter of Alan III, Viscount of Rohan, and Constance of Penthièvre, a sister of Duke of Brittany Conan IV. They had:

- Harvey II (died in 1218 or 1219), who succeeded his father;
- Alan of Léon (died after 1206)
- Guihomar of Léon (died after 1206)
- Salomon of Léon (died on 20 April 1223)
- Constance of Léon, wife of Peter of Malestroit and mother of Odo of Malestroit.

=== Death ===
Herve I died on 21 July 1203.

== Sources ==
- de La Borderie, Arthur Le Moyne (1975). Histoire de Bretagne (in French). Vol. 3. Joseph Floch.
- Morvan, Frederic (2009). La Chevalerie bretonne et la formation de l'armee ducale, 1260-1341 (in French). Presses Universitaires de Rennes.
- Chaillou, Léa. The House of Léon: Genealogy and Origins. Foundations: The Journal of the Foundation for Medieval Genealogy, volume 11, 2019, pp. 19–48 ISSN 1479-5078
- Patrick Kernévez and Frédéric Morvan Généalogie des Hervé de Léon (vers 1180-1363). Bulletin de la Société archéologique du Finistère, 2002, p. 279-312.
