= Harvey I of Léon =

Harvey I of Léon (c. 1068–aft. 1128) was a Viscount of Léon.

== Life ==
Harvey I was the son of Guihomar II and the father of Guihomar III.

"Harvey son of Guihomar of Léon" is said to have taken part to the First Crusade between 1096 and 1101 with Duke Alan IV Fergent.

Harvey I founded the priory of Saint-Martin in Morlaix on 3 March 1128. His son and successor Guihomar signed with him the foundation charter of the priory of Saint-Martin.

== Sources ==
- Patrick Kernévez, André-Yves Bourgès Généalogie des vicomtes de Léon (XIe, XIIe et XIIIe siècles). Bulletin de la Société archéologique du Finistère, volume CXXXVI, 2007, p. 157-188.
