= Guihomar I of Léon =

Viscount of Léon

Guihomar I of Léon was one of the first Viscounts of Léon. He lived c. 970 - 1055.

== Life ==
Léa Chaillou believes that he was born circa 970, the son of Alan de Léon, himself the son of a possible great-granddaughter of Alan I, King of Brittany. He is cited in 1021 and in 1034 or 1040. He is said to have owned estates in the Kemenet-Héboé in the Bishopric of Cornouaille. This rise in power threatened Alain Canhiart, the Count of Cornouailles, who was victorious in 1055 and gave the hamlet of Lezugar en Beuzec to the episcopal authority. Guihomar I was still alive at the time.

== Issue ==
Guihomar is said to have had a son named Éhuarn but according to Joëlle Quaghebeur Ehuarn was actually a “Viscount from Cornouaille”, that is to say of a Viscount of Le Faou who married a woman belonging to the House of Léon. Chaillou attributes to him two sons, Alan II (c. 995–aft. 1060) and Alfred (d. aft 1060). Alan II had three children, Guihomar, Anne/Emma who married Odo I, Viscount of Porhoët and another daughter, name unknown, who married Ehuarn II, Viscount of Châuteaulin. Their first-born son Harvey inherited that title, the middle son was Guihomar II and the youngest son Gradlon became the ancestor of the Viscounts of Faou. He was undoubtedly succeeded by his supposed grandson and namesake Guihomar II as Viscount of Léon.

== Sources ==
- Chaillou, Léa. The House of Léon: Genealogy and Origins. Foundations: The Journal of the Foundation for Medieval Genealogy, volume 11, 2019, pp. 19–48 ISSN 1479-5078
- Patrick Kernévez, André-Yves Bourgès Généalogie des vicomtes de Léon (XIe, XIIe et XIIIe siècles). Bulletin de la Société archéologique du Finistère, t. CXXXVI, 2007, p. 157-188.
- André-Yves Bourgès, L’expansion territoriale des vicomtes de Léon à l’époque féodale, dans Bulletin de la Société archéologique du Finistère, tome CXXVI, 1997
