= Coat-Méal =

Coat-Méal Koz-Meal
- Commune
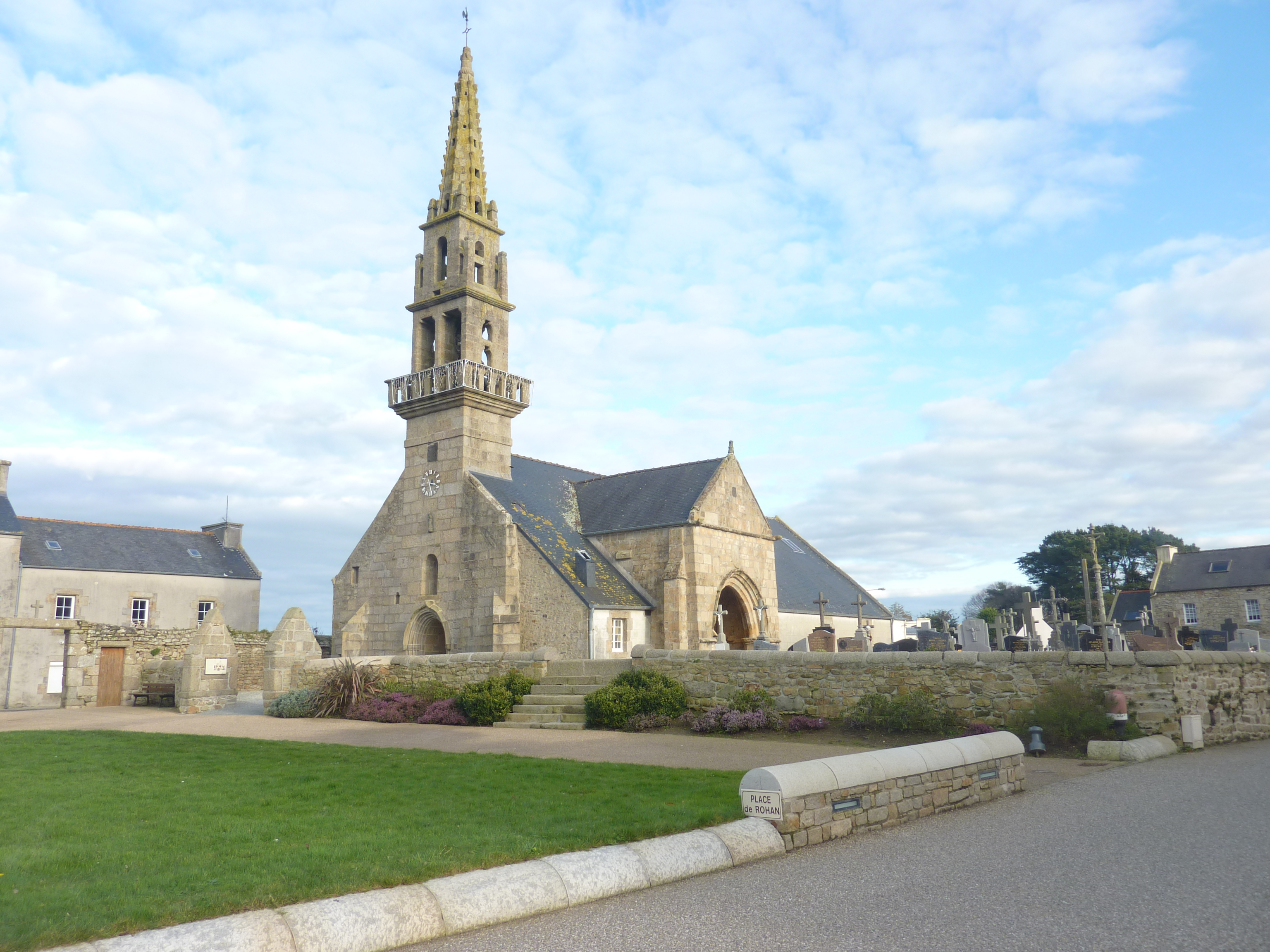
- The Place de Rohan, in Coat-Méal

- Coat of arms
- Location of Coat-Méal
- Location within France Location within Brittany
- Coordinates: 48°30′31″N 4°32′27″W
- Country: France
- Region: Brittany
- Department: Finistère
- Arrondissement: Brest
- Canton: Plabennec

Government
  - Mayor (2021–2026): Martial Clavier
- Area^{1}: 10.82 km^{2} (4.18 sq mi)
- Highest elevation: 88 m (289 ft)
- Lowest elevation: 13 m (43 ft)
- Population (2023): 1,133
  - Density: 104.7/km^{2} (271.2/sq mi)
- Time zone: UTC+01:00 (CET)
  - Summer (DST): UTC+02:00 (CEST)
- INSEE/Postal code: 29035 /29870
- ^{1} French Land Register data, which excludes lakes, ponds, glaciers > 1 km^{2} (0.386 sq mi or 247 acres) and river estuaries.

Coat-Méal (French pronunciation: [kwat meal]; Breton: Koz-Meal) is a commune in the Finistère department of Brittany in northwestern France.

== Population ==
Inhabitants of Coat-Méal are called in French Coat-Méaliens.

== See also ==
- Communes of the Finistère department
