= Charleval, Eure =

Charleval
- Commune
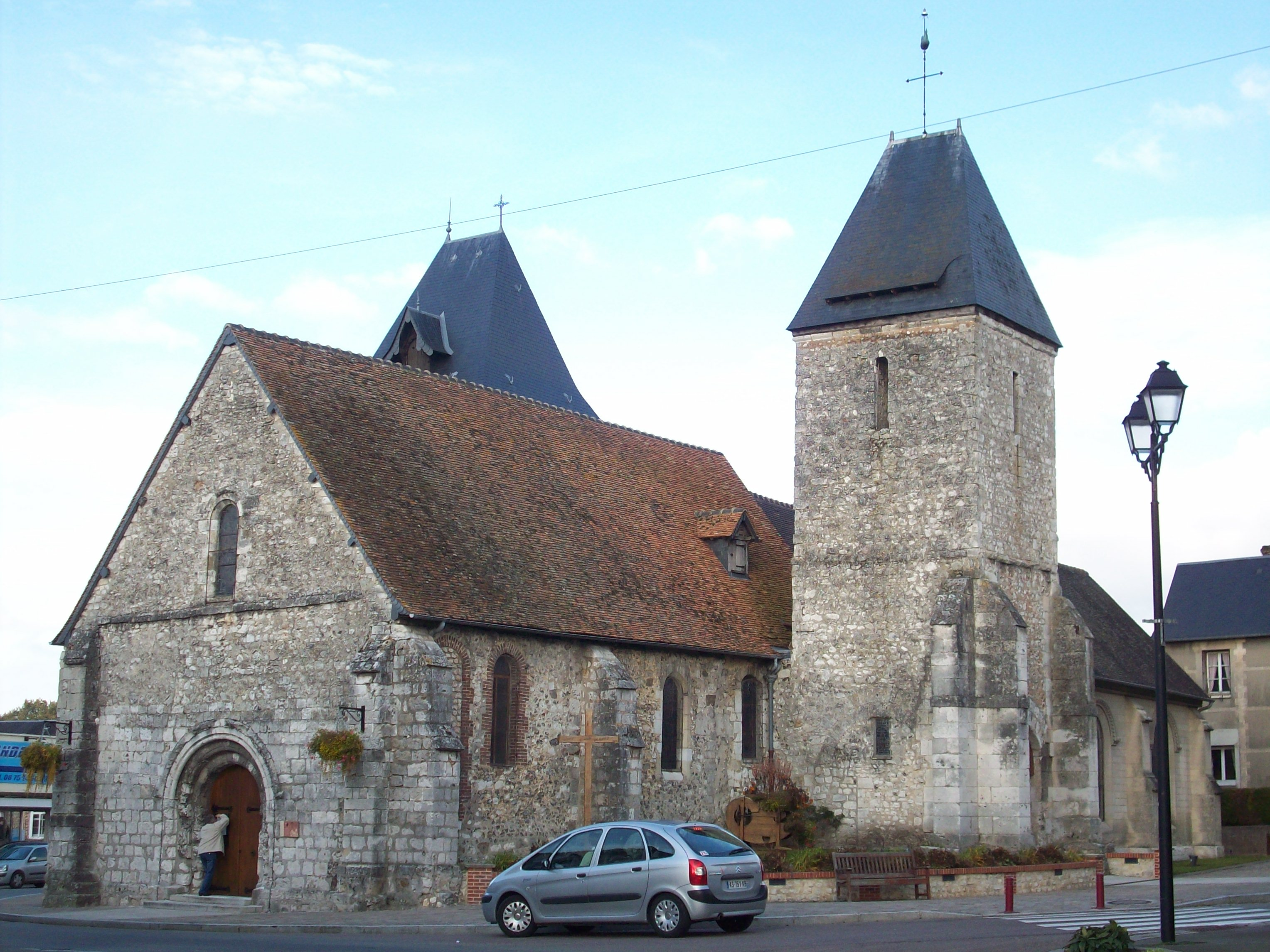
- The church in Charleval

- Coat of arms
- Location of Charleval
- Location within France Location within Normandy
- Coordinates: 49°22′18″N 1°23′02″E
- Country: France
- Region: Normandy
- Department: Eure
- Arrondissement: Les Andelys
- Canton: Romilly-sur-Andelle

Government
  - Mayor (2020–2026): Pascal Calais
- Area^{1}: 14.14 km^{2} (5.46 sq mi)
- Elevation: 47 m (154 ft)
- Highest elevation: 140 m (460 ft)
- Lowest elevation: 28 m (92 ft)
- Population (2023): 1,701
  - Density: 120.3/km^{2} (311.6/sq mi)
- Time zone: UTC+01:00 (CET)
  - Summer (DST): UTC+02:00 (CEST)
- INSEE/Postal code: 27151 /27380
- ^{1} French Land Register data, which excludes lakes, ponds, glaciers > 1 km^{2} (0.386 sq mi or 247 acres) and river estuaries.

Charleval (French pronunciation: [ʃaʁləval]) is a commune in the Eure department in northern France.

== History ==
Formerly known as Noyon-sur-Andelle, it was renamed Charleval in honour of King Charles IX.

The Château de Charleval (begun 1570, unfinished, disappeared) was designed by Jacques I Androuet du Cerceau, who engraved his designs and published them in 1579.

Château de Charleval
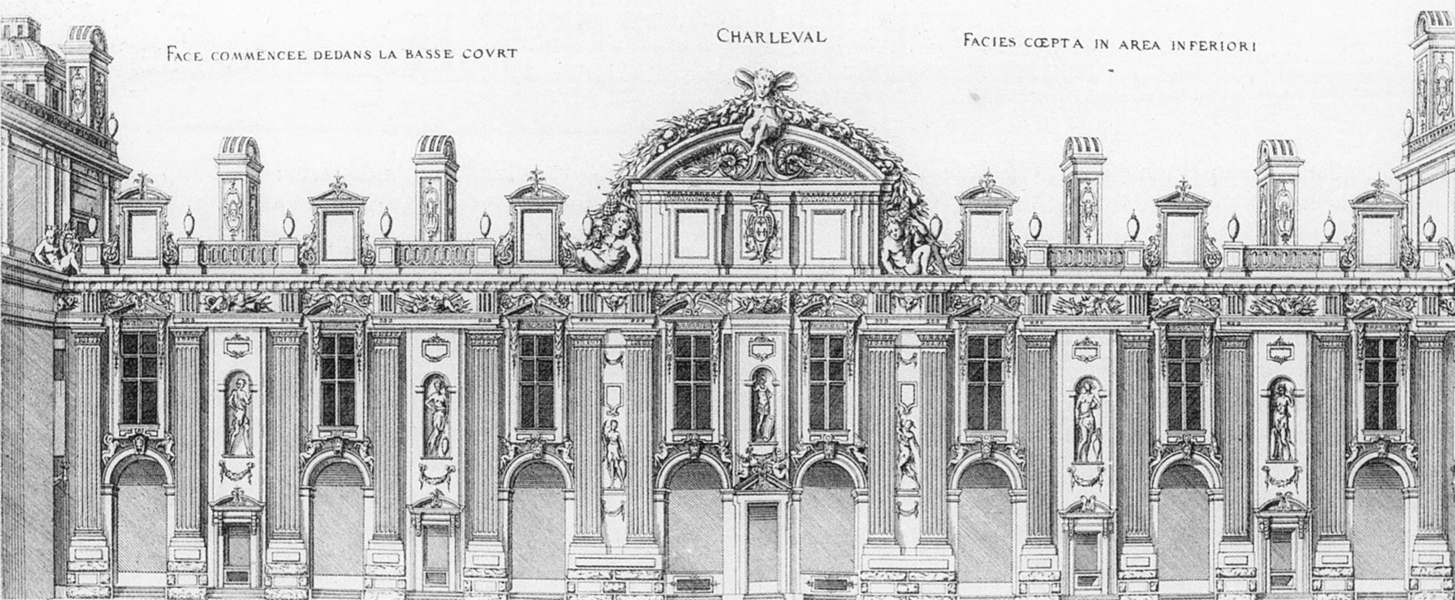
Court facade

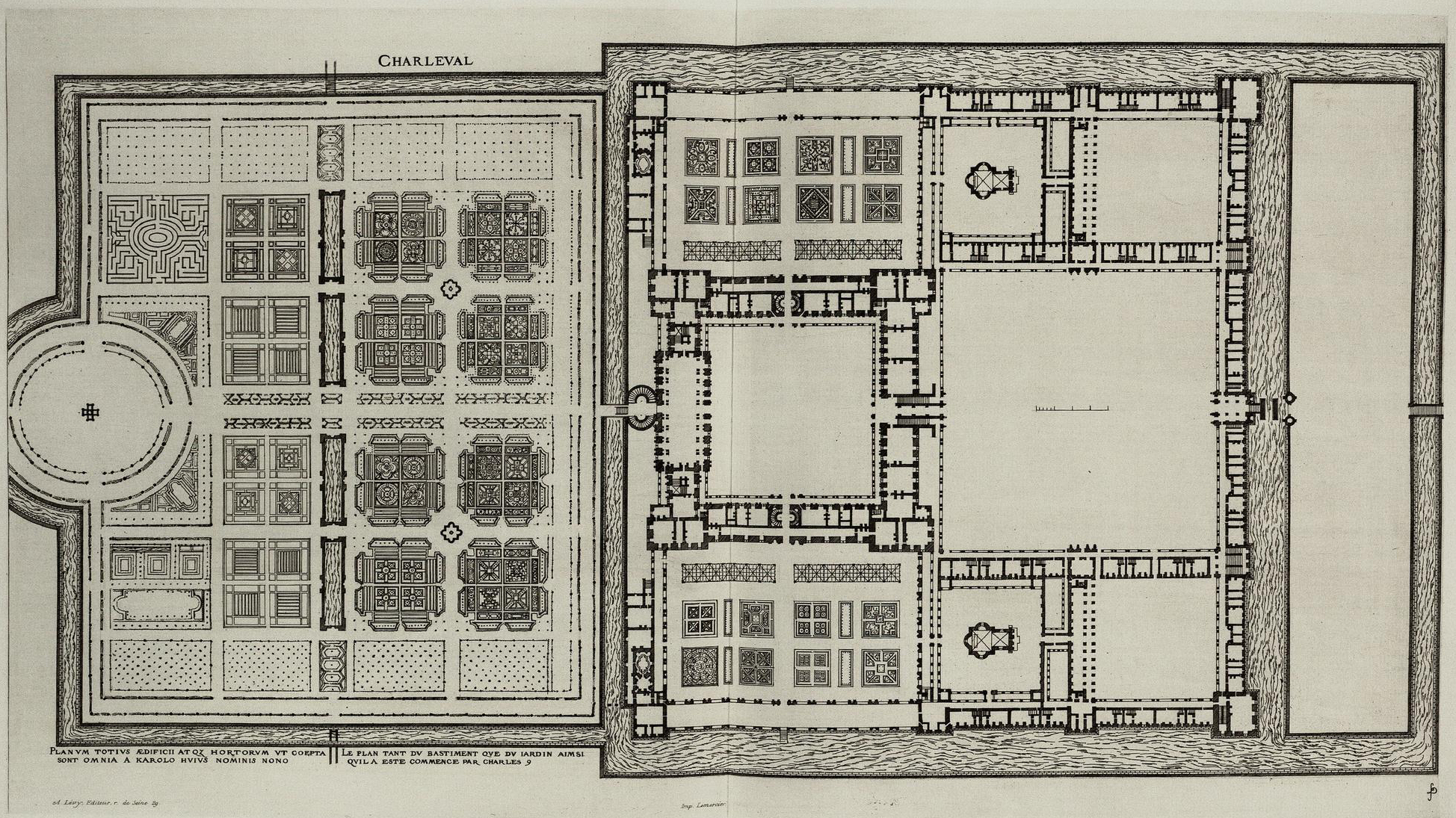
General plan

== Population ==
Historical population
Year	Pop.	±% p.a.
1968	1,636	—
1975	1,654	+0.16%
1982	1,753	+0.83%
1990	1,768	+0.11%
1999	1,872	+0.64%
2007	1,832	−0.27%
2012	1,847	+0.16%
2017	1,789	−0.64%
2023	1,701	−0.84%
Source: INSEE

== See also ==
- Communes of the Eure department
