= La Roche-Maurice =

La Roche-Maurice Ar Roc'h-Morvan (Breton)
- Commune
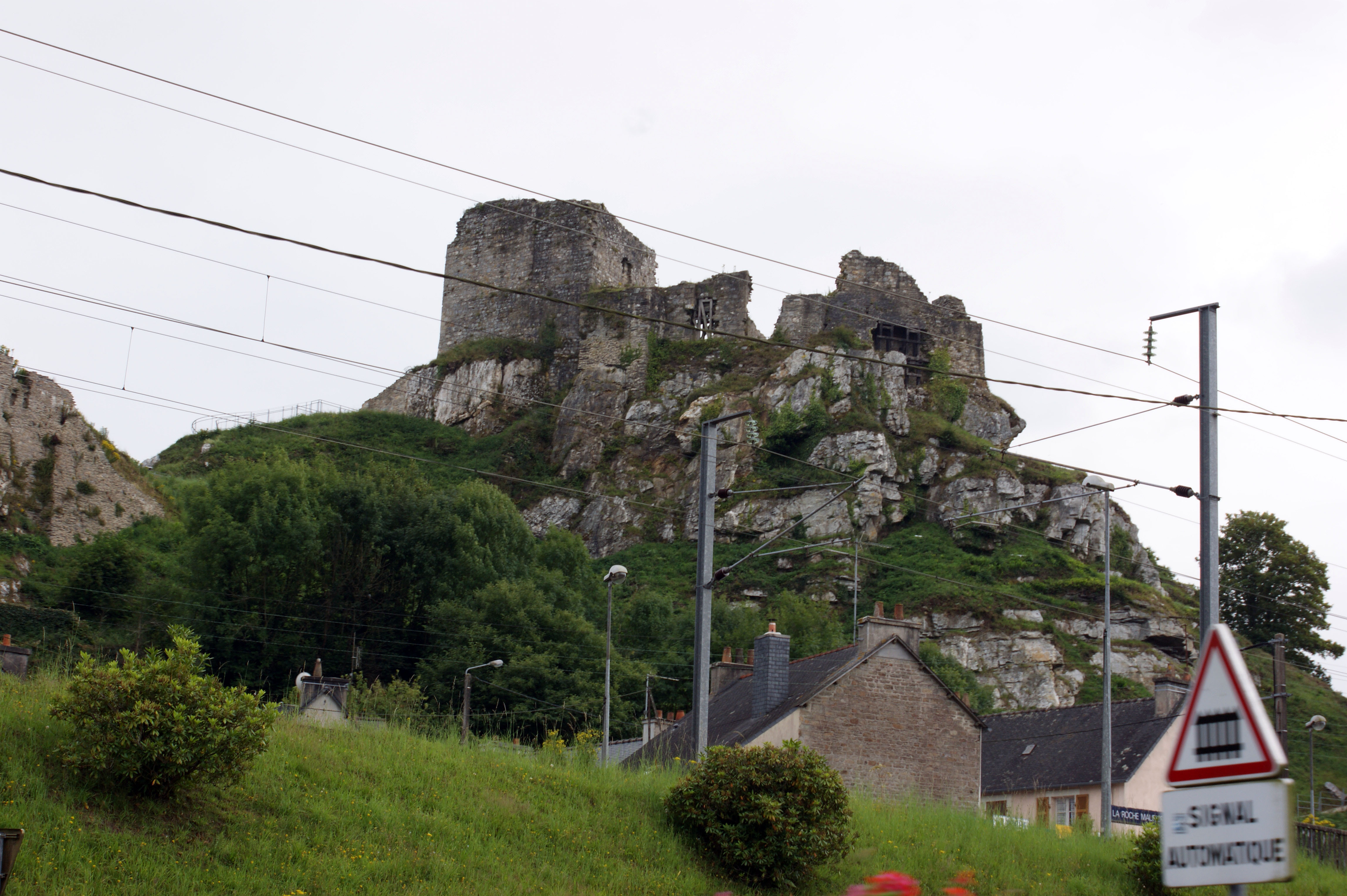
- La-Roche-Maurice behind the railway line

- Coat of arms
- Location of La Roche-Maurice
- Location within France Location within Brittany
- Coordinates: 48°28′25″N 4°12′12″W
- Country: France
- Region: Brittany
- Department: Finistère
- Arrondissement: Brest
- Canton: Landerneau
- Intercommunality: CA Pays de Landerneau-Daoulas

Government
  - Mayor (2020–2026): Lénaïc Blandin
- Area^{1}: 12.04 km^{2} (4.65 sq mi)
- Elevation: 100 m (330 ft)
- Highest elevation: 163 m (535 ft)
- Lowest elevation: 5 m (16 ft)
- Population (2023): 1,893
  - Density: 157.2/km^{2} (407.2/sq mi)
- Time zone: UTC+01:00 (CET)
  - Summer (DST): UTC+02:00 (CEST)
- INSEE/Postal code: 29237 /29800
- ^{1} French Land Register data, which excludes lakes, ponds, glaciers > 1 km^{2} (0.386 sq mi or 247 acres) and river estuaries.

La Roche-Maurice (French: [la ʁɔʃ mɔʁis]; Breton: Ar Roc'h-Morvan) is a commune in the Finistère department of Brittany in northwestern France.

== Population ==
Inhabitants of La Roche-Maurice are called in French Rochois.

== International relations ==
La Roche Maurice's twin town is Bishopsteignton, a village between Newton Abbot and Teignmouth in Devon, England.

== See also ==
- Communes of the Finistère department
- La Roche-Maurice Parish close
- List of the works of the Maître de Thégonnec
