= History of the anchor =

The most ancient anchors were probably rocks and many rock anchors have been discovered originating from at least the Bronze Age. Many modern moorings remain reliant upon a large rock as the primary element of their design. However, using pure mass to resist the forces of a storm only works well as a permanent mooring; trying to move a large enough rock to another bay is nearly impossible.

The ancient Greeks used baskets of stones, large sacks filled with sand, and wooden logs filled with lead, which, according to Apollonius Rhodius and Stephen of Byzantium, were formed of stone; and Athenaeus states that they were sometimes made of wood. Such anchors held the vessel merely by their weight and by their friction along the bottom. Lashing tree branches to the stone formed teeth or "flukes", to fasten themselves into the bottom. Advances in woodworking and metallurgy encouraged development of improved shapes for more compact, durable, as well as efficient anchors.

== Early designs ==
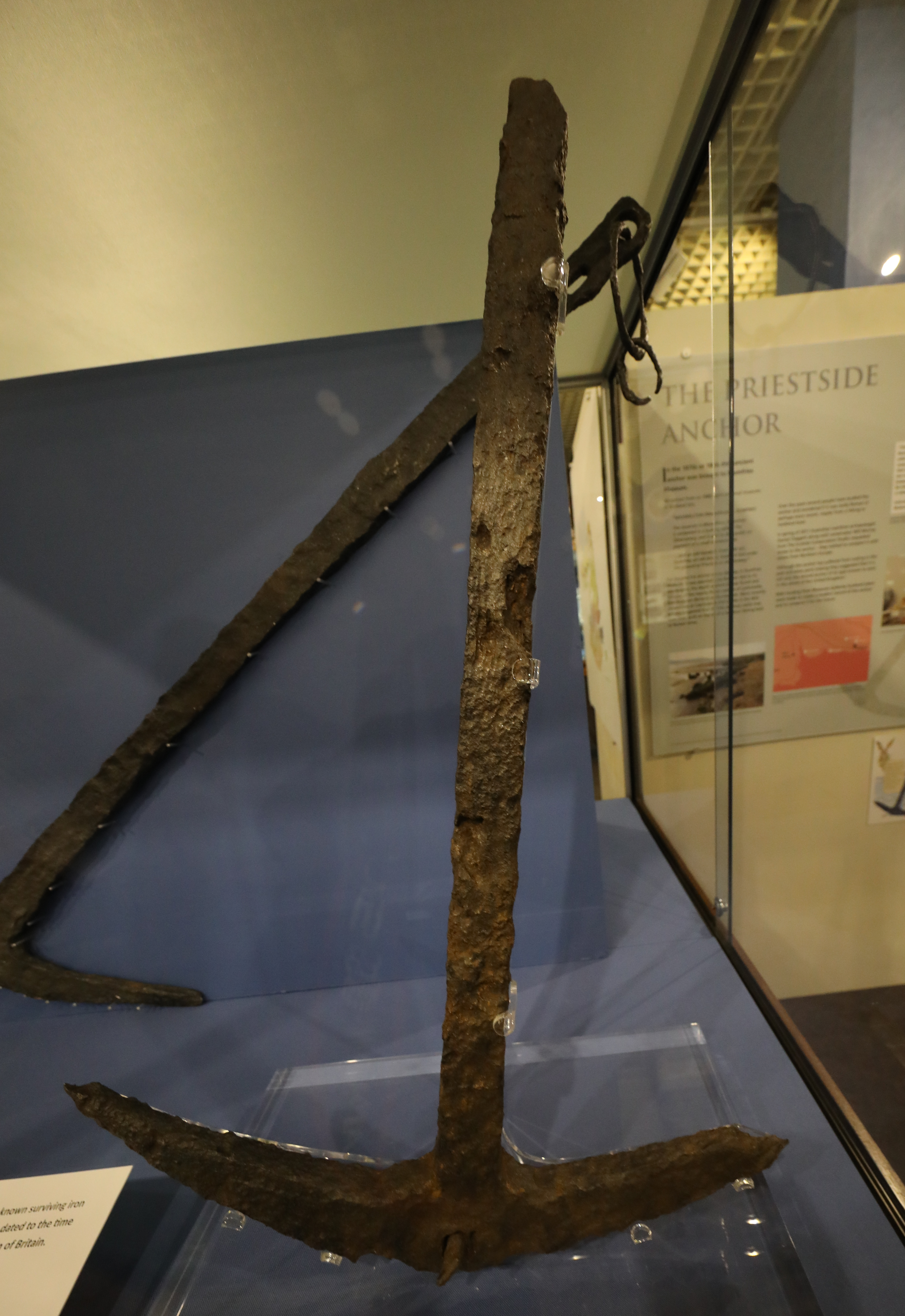
The iron Priestside Roman anchor, found in Priestside in Dumfries and Galloway, Scotland

Killicks are primitive anchors formed by lashing tree branches to a stone for weight. Greeks were using mushroom anchors by 400 B.C. fashioned from a flattened stone with a hole drilled through the center and a triangular eyebolt at the crown for "tripping" the anchor out of its bed.

Roman iron anchors were in use from the republican period onwards. Originally they were closely modelled on earlier wooden anchors with removable lead stocks. Over time the design of the arms changed probably to increase the ease with which the anchor could be pulled out of the sand or mud it was embedded in. Towards the end of the Roman period stocks became fixed rather than removable.

Scandinavians were fashioning similar anchors of iron with wooden stocks by 700 A.D. The ends of the arms sometimes flared into flattened palms to distribute force through seabed soil.

=== Teeth ===
The words ὀδὁντες and dentes (both meaning "teeth") are frequently used to denote anchors in Greek and Latin poems. The invention of the teeth is ascribed by Pliny to the Tuscans; but Pausanias gives the credit to Midas, king of Phrygia. Originally there was only one fluke or tooth, whence anchors were called ἑτερόστομοι; but a second was added, according to Pliny, by Eupalamus, or, according to Strabo, by Anacharsis, the Scythian philosopher. The anchors with two teeth were called ἀμϕἱβολοι or ἀμϕἱστομοι, and from ancient monuments appear to have resembled generally those used in modern days except that the stock is absent from them all. Every ship had several anchors; the largest, corresponding to our sheet anchor, was used only in extreme danger, and was hence peculiarly termed ἱερά or sacra, whence the proverb sacram anchram solvere, as flying to the last refuge.

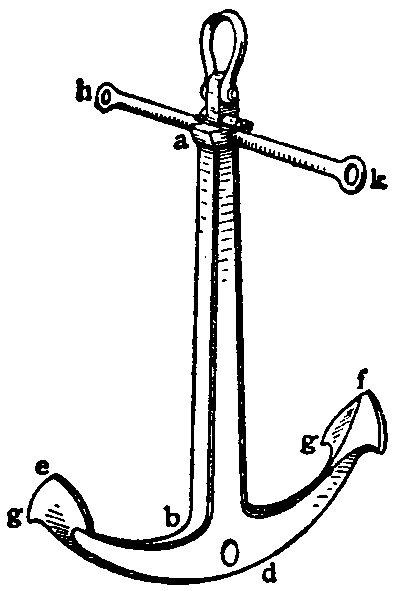
Rodgers Anchor. The arms, de, df were formed in one piece, and were pivoted at the crown d on a bolt passing through the forked shank ab. The points or pees e, f, to the palms g were blunt.

=== Nomenclature ===
By the first century, Romans were using anchors similar to what might be considered the traditional design with a wooden stem or shank to which the mooring line was attached at the end opposite the crown where pointed wooden arms or flukes were attached. A perpendicular stock of antimony or a hard lead alloy was intended to lie flat along the sea floor to properly align an arm to dig into the sea floor.

== The 19th century ==
Until the beginning of the 19th century anchors were of imperfect manufacture, the means of effecting good and efficient welding being absent and the iron poor, whilst the arms, being straight, generally parted at the crown, when weighing from good holding-ground. A clerk in Plymouth Yard, named Pering, in the early part of that century (1813) introduced curved arms; and after 1852 the British admiralty anchor, under the direction of the Board, was supplied to H.M. ships, followed by Lieutenant (afterwards Captain) Rodger's anchor. Rodger's anchor marked a great departure from the form of previous anchors. The arms were formed in one piece, and were pivoted at the crown on a bolt passing through the forked shank. The points or pees to the palms were blunt. This anchor had an excellent reputation amongst nautical men of that period, and by the committee on anchors, appointed by the British admiralty in 1852, it was placed second only to the anchor of Trotman.

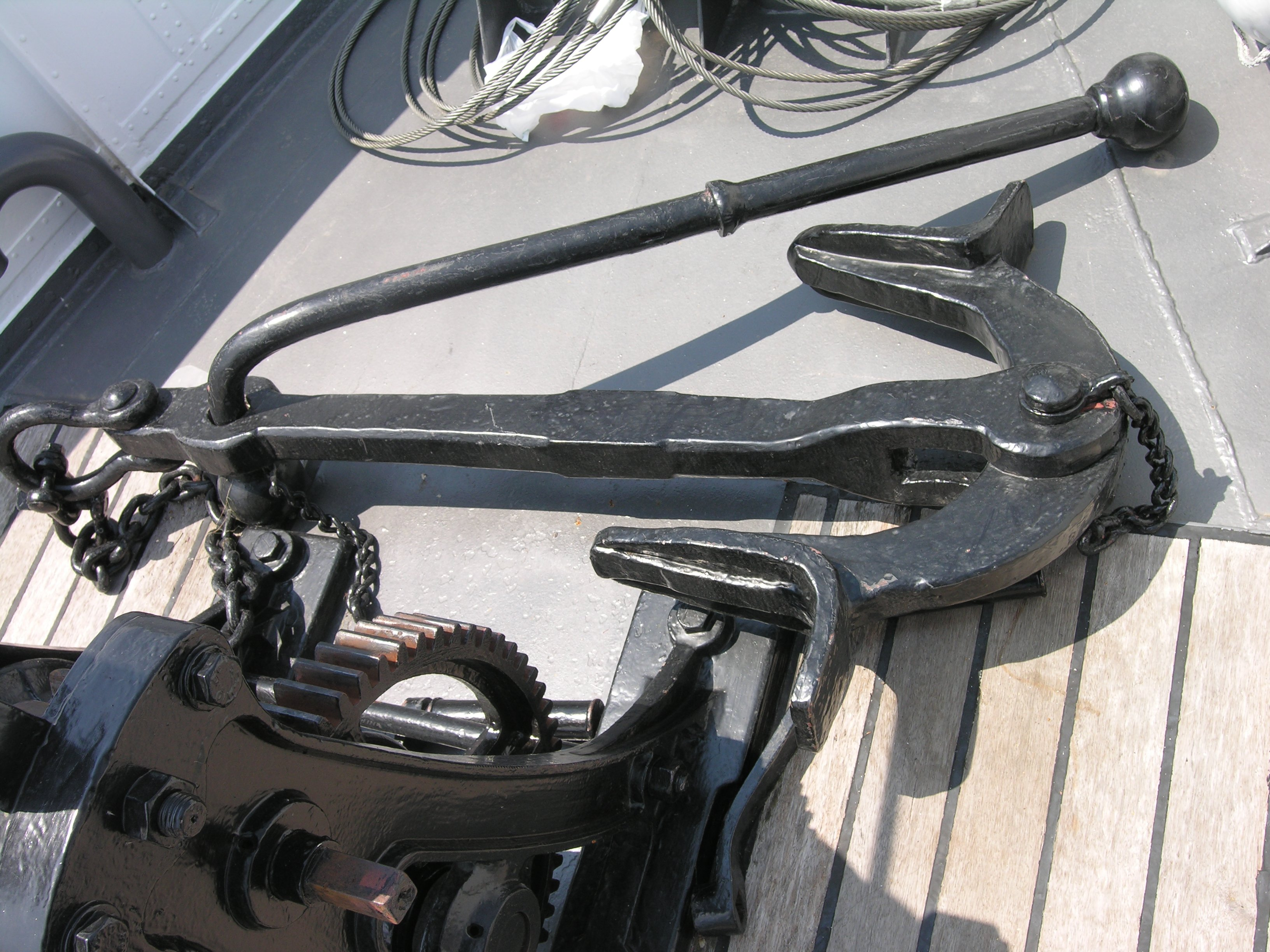
Trotman's anchor is still in use on riverine ships

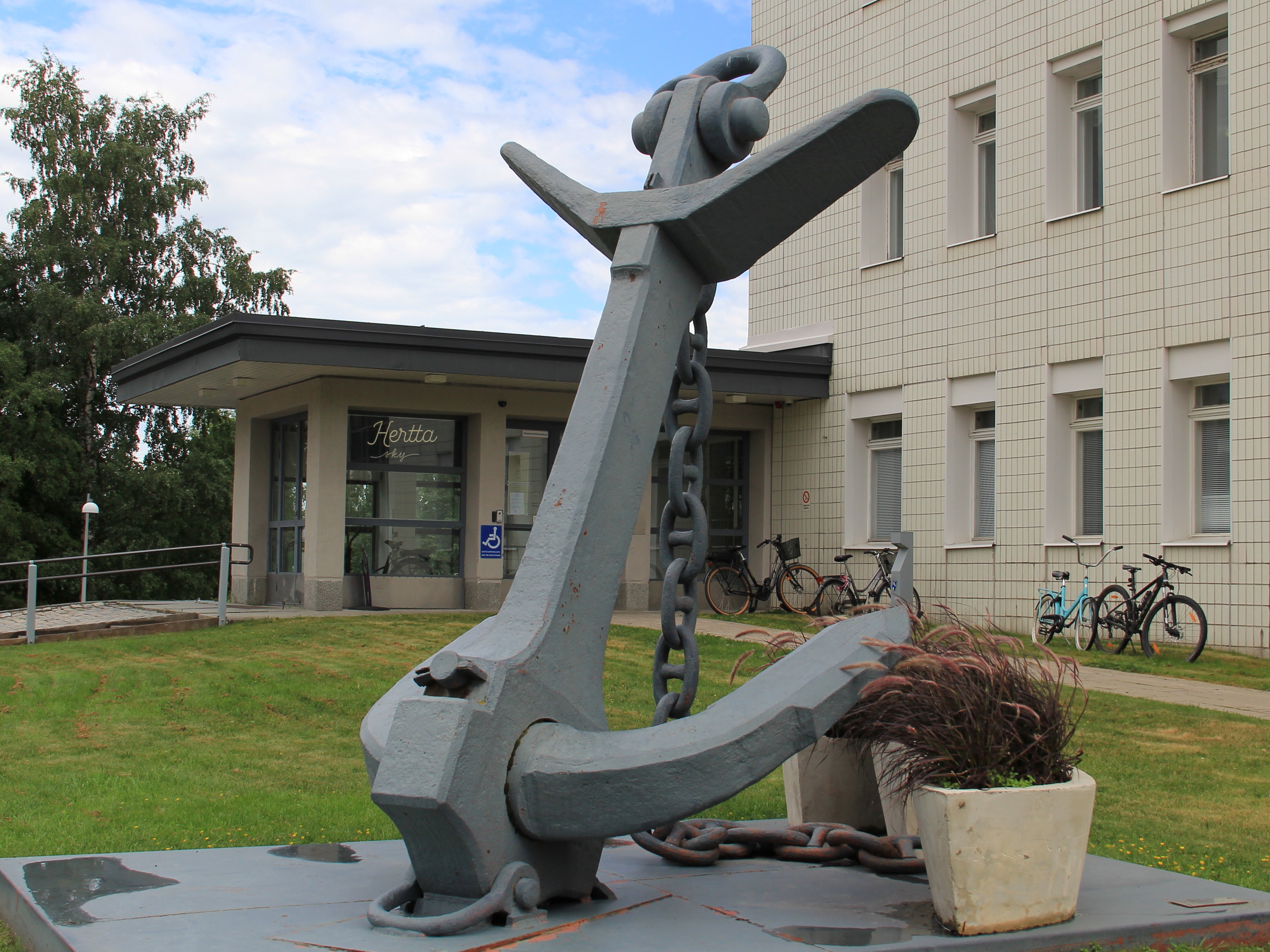
Original Martin anchor from a ship completed in 1874

The first stockless and self-canting anchor, in principle quite similar to later Byer's anchor, was developed by master mariner from Plumstead Richard Francis Hawkins and patented in 1821. It has been called "the first real improvement" since antiquity. Irish publisher of nautical charts Robert Blachford organized manufacture of such anchors and printed a book on them to promote their use in 1823. Hawkins' anchor was tested by the Dutch Navy in 1825 which dismissed it as not holding well in mud. It's believed that the invention appeared ahead of its time and thus wasn't adopted.

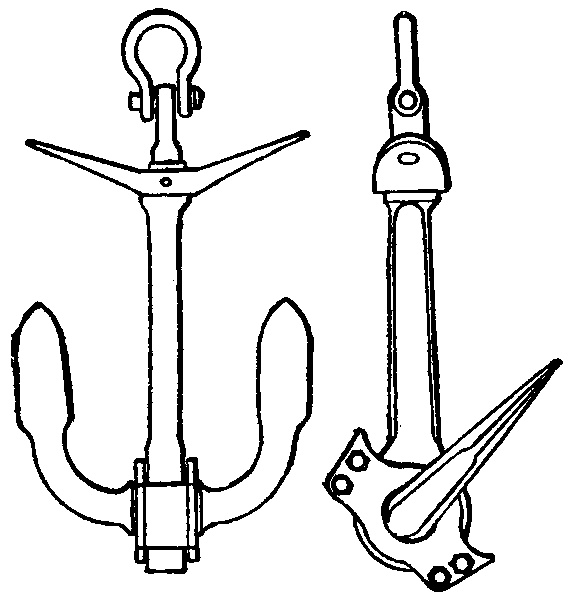
Improved Martin Anchor

In the late 1850s (first manufactured in 1859 but only adopted much later; as late as 1864, the negative experience with Hawkins anchor was cited as an argument that stockless anchors should be "condemned") came the self-canting and close-stowing anchor designed by François Martin, which, passing through successive improvements, became the improved Martin anchor. An important advantage it had was that it didn't require any welds and was made only from forged iron, leading to a lower price. A projection in the center of the arms works in a recess at the hub of the shank; the vacancies outside the shank are filled by blocks bolted through on each side, and are flush with the side plates, which keep the flukes in position.

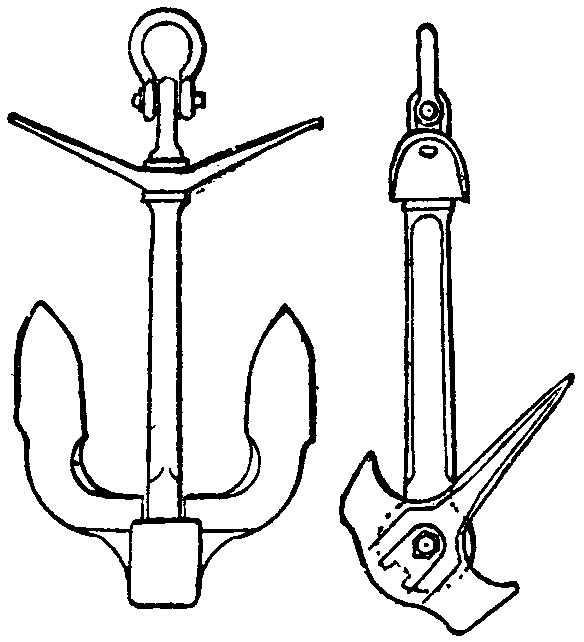
Improved Martin-Adelphi anchor

The introduction of cast steel in 1894 led to the improved Martin-Adelphi pattern, in which the crown and arms are cast in one, and, with the stock, are made of cast steel, the shank remaining of forged iron. A projection in the crown works in a recess (right image), and is secured in its place by a forged steel pin, fitted with a nut and washer, which passes through the crown and the heel of the shank.

All of the above anchors were provided with a stock, the use of which is to "cant" the anchor. If it falls on the ground, resting on one arm and one stock, when a strain is brought on the cable, the stock cants the anchor, causing the arms to lie at a downward angle to the holding ground; and the pees enter and bury themselves below the surface of the soil.

Stockless anchors were first extensively adopted in the British mercantile marine and in some navies. In 1903 they were adopted generally for the British Navy, after extensive anchor trials, begun in 1885. Their advantages are: handiness combined with a saving of time and labor; absence of davits, anchor-beds, and other gear, with a resulting reduction in weight; and a clear forecastle for "right ahead" gun fire or for working ship. On the other hand, a larger hawsepipe is required, and there appears to be a consensus that a stockless anchor, when "let go" does not hold so quickly as a stocked one, is more uncertain in its action over uneven ground, and is more liable to "come home" (drag).

By 21st century they became universal on ships where ease of storage and mechanical operation is more important than anchor weight.

== The 20th century ==
At the beginning of the 20th century, the stockless anchors principally in use in the British Navy were Hall's improved, Byer's, and Wasteneys Smith's.

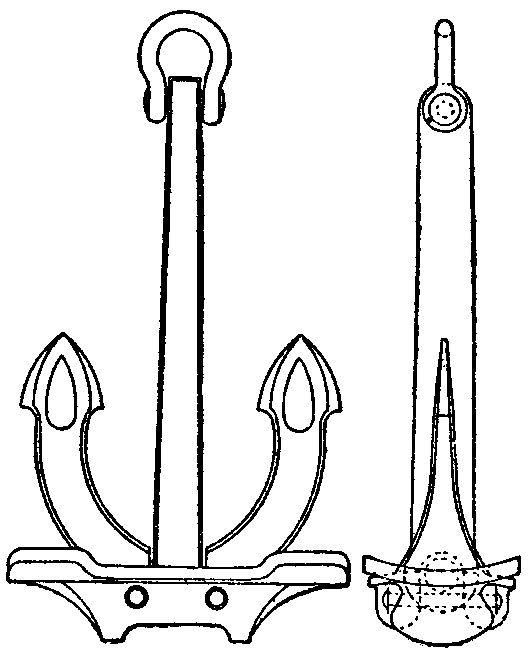
Hall's improved stockless anchor

In Hall's improved anchor, the arms and crown of cast steel are in one piece, and the shank of forged steel passes up through an aperture in the crown to which it is secured by two cross bolts. Two trunnions or lugs are forged to the lower end of the shank.

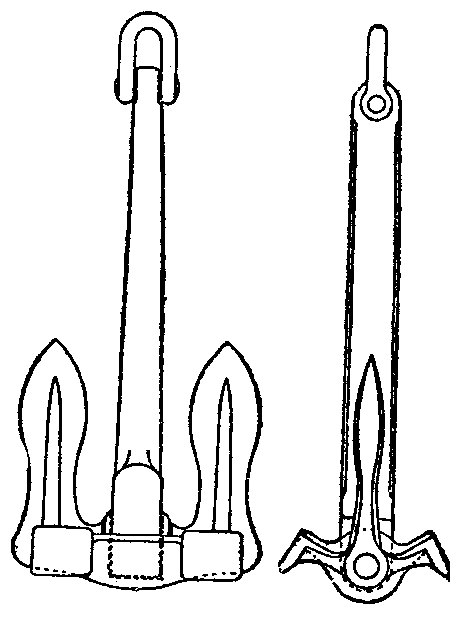
Byer's stockless anchor

In W.L. Byer's plan, the flukes and crown consist of a steel-casting secured to a forged shank by a through bolt of mild steel, the axis of which is parallel to the points of the flukes; one end of the bolt has a head, but the other is screwed and fitted with a phosphor bronze nut to allow the bolt to be withdrawn for examination. A palm is cast on each side of the crown to trip the flukes when the anchor is on the ground, and for bringing them snug against the ship's side when weighing.

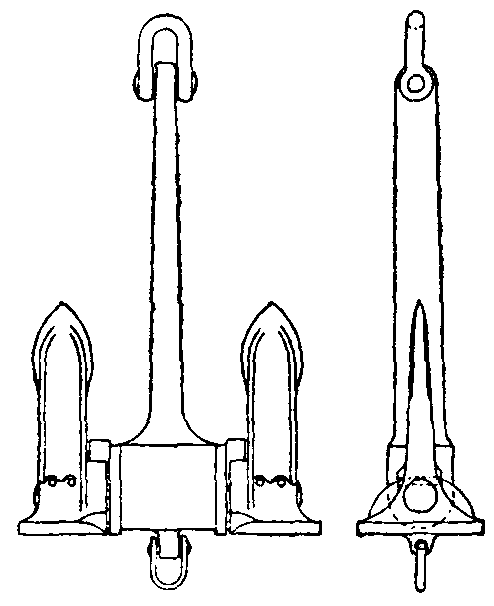
Wasteneys Smith's stockless anchor

Wasteneys Smith's anchor is composed of three main parts, the shank and crown which form one forging, and the two flukes or arms which are separate castings. A bolt passes through the crown of the anchor, connecting the flukes to it; to prevent the flukes working off the connecting through bolt, two smaller bolts pass through the flukes at right angles to the through bolt and are recessed half their diameter into it.

=== Small boat anchor patterns ===
Small boat anchors have developed a bit separately from the first half of the 20th century, with the advent of the "CQR (Secure)", developed by Sir Geoffrey Ingram Taylor (7 March 1886 – 27 June 1975) in the early 1930s. This design was not symmetrical, and required the use of a bow-roller design to effectively stow it. This is practical for small boats and yachts, but does not scale in a practical manner for large shipping. The CQR is now manufactured by Lewmar. The CQR Anchor is still used by the Royal Navy on their coastal protection vessels such as the Archer Class.

American Richard Danforth invented and developed the "Danforth" pattern in the 1940s, a return to the symmetrical concept but with very large flat plate flukes. This anchor offers very good holding power for its weight (high efficiency) but does not perform well in other respects, meaning that it is not a good general purpose anchor. The original Danforth is still manufactured and sold by Tie Down Engineering in the USA.

Peter Bruce of the Isle of Man in the UK developed the claw-type "Bruce" anchor in the 1970s. Bruce Anchor Co has its primary role in the very large anchor business, producing mooring anchors and permanent installation types for heavy industry, such as oilrigs. On the back of this reputation, the Bruce small boat anchor type was initially very successful, and represented some significant improvements over the CQR. It is no longer produced.

New generation anchors have come into force since the latter part of the 20th century. The German "Buegelanker" features a simple single flat triangular fluke, with a roll-bar to ensure correct setting. A surprisingly simple design, this has proven more effective than its ancestors. Frenchman Alain Poiraud developed the "Spade" anchor in the 1990s, a huge leap in performance over any types which proceeded it. The Spade was the first anchor to successfully make use of a concave fluke, which provides the greatest efficiency (as opposed to the convex "plow" type of the CQR, or the flat "plate" type of the Danforth).

== The 21st century ==
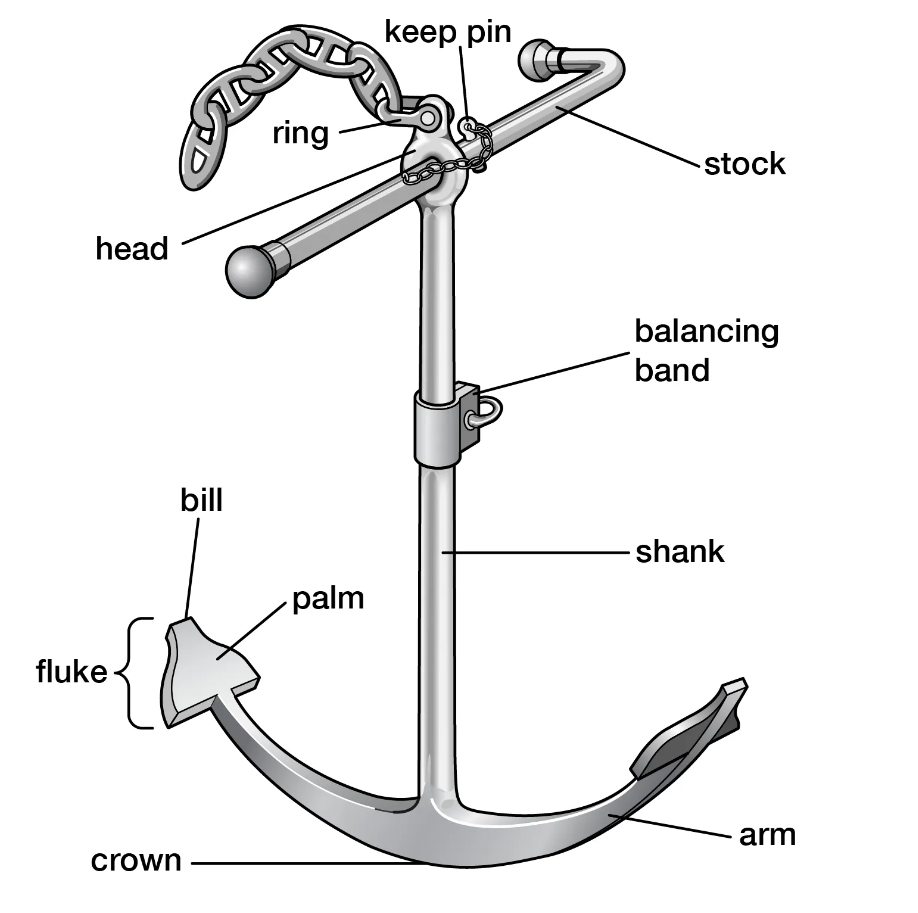
Modern anchor anatomy.

Under contemporary law, maritime regulatory entities often require an additional anchor upon underway vessels in the event of emergency, given that anchors have been known to fail due to age or stress. This has also been of benefit with mooring whilst ships are loading or unloading, enhancing the vessels' link with the port or harbour and thus hastening the mooring duration. Chain length however is of debate given the varying ocean depth.

=== Continued development of small boat anchor patterns ===
The "Bulwagga" is essentially a modified fluke style anchor which made itself known at the very beginning of the 2000s. Rather than two flukes in a symmetrical configuration, it adds a third for an equilateral triangular arrangement. This concept is an improvement over the Danforth in terms of general purpose usage, but is, comparatively, slightly inefficient (because one fluke is always unused), and is difficult to stow.

New Zealander Peter Smith in the early 2000s took elements of the Spade and other types, and developed unique solutions of his own, in order to design the "Rocna" anchor, a general purpose type which uses a concave fluke, a self-righting roll-bar, and setting skids.

== Bibliography ==
- Blackwell, Alex & Daria; Happy Hooking – the Art of Anchoring, 2008, 2011, 2019 White Seahorse; ISBN 978-1795717410
- Hinz, Earl R.; The Complete Book of Anchoring and Mooring, Rev. 2d ed., 1986, 1994, 2001 Cornell Maritime Press; ISBN 0-87033-539-1
- Hiscock, Eric C.; Cruising Under Sail, second edition, 1965 Oxford University Press; ISBN 0-19-217522-X
- Pardey, Lin and Larry; The Capable Cruiser; 1995 Pardey Books/Paradise Cay Publications; ISBN 0-9646036-2-4
- Rousmaniere, John; The Annapolis Book of Seamanship, 1983, 1989 Simon and Schuster; ISBN 0-671-67447-1
