= Pierre-Olivier Malherbe =

French explorer

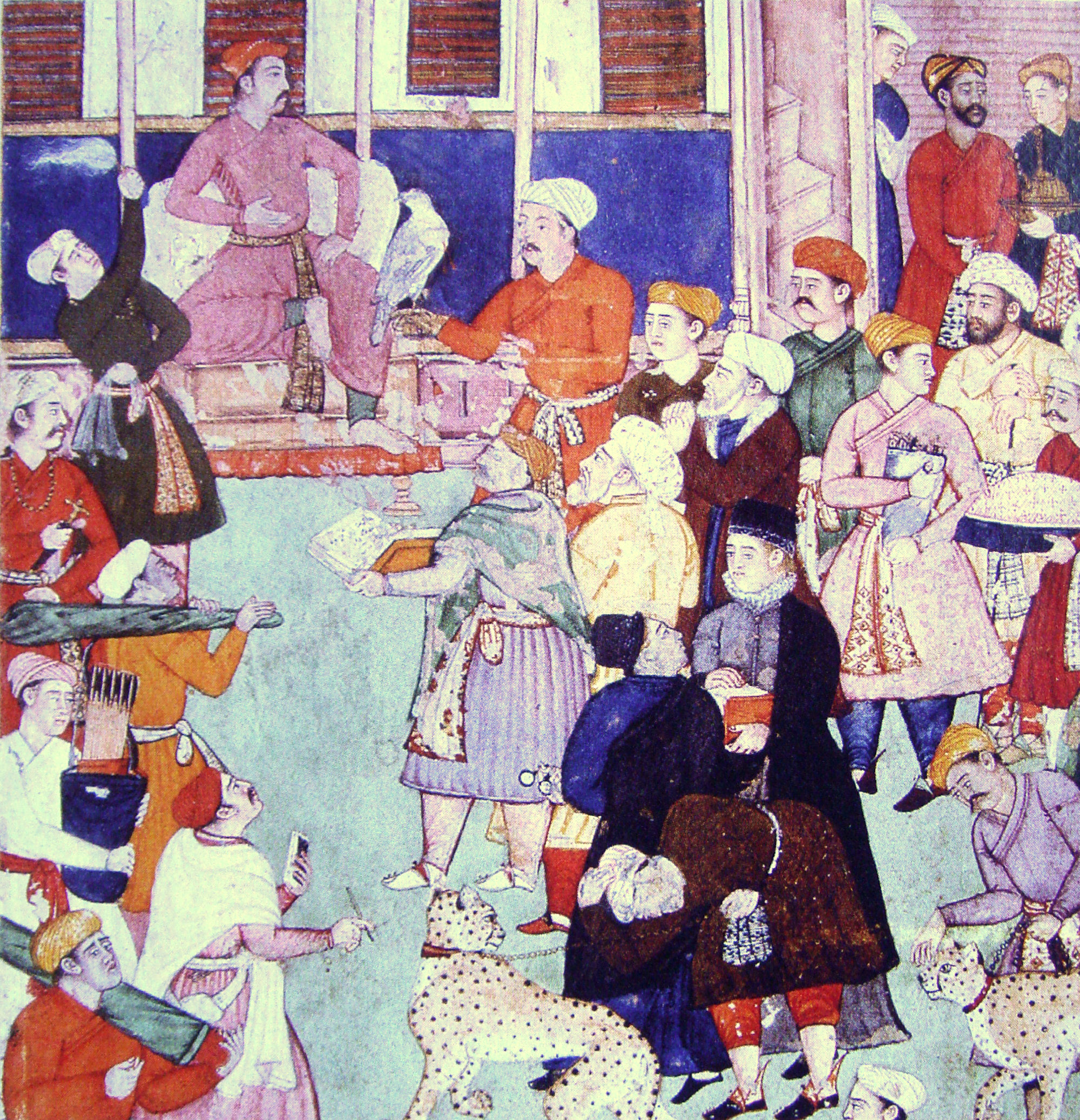
Akbar the Great with European visitors.

Pierre-Olivier Malherbe (French pronunciation: [pjɛʁ ɔlivje malɛʁb]; 1569 in Vitré, France –1616 in Spain) was a French explorer. He is considered the first traveler to have circled the globe entirely by land.

== Biography ==
Pierre-Olivier Malherbe went on 27-year world tour, and returned to France in 1609. He has a claim to being the first French circumnavigator. He visited China, and in India had an encounter with Akbar the Great, Mughal emperor from 1556 to 1605.

Upon his return, Pierre-Olivier Malherbe met several times with the French king Henry IV, to tell him about the gold and silver of the East Indies. He explained about the routes to reach these places, and offered to lead an expedition for the king.

Pierre-Olivier Malherbe may have been the author of a Malay language dictionary, which was added to François Martin de Vitré's work La Description du premier voyage fait aux Indes orientales par les Français en l'an 1603 in 1609.

He is mentioned in the 1629 Traité de navigation et des voyages de découvertes et conquêtes, principalement des François by geographer Pierre Bergeron.

In Paris, he also met with the Dutch linguist Erpenius, who was preparing the first Latin–Arab Dictionary.

== See also ==
- France-Asia relations
