= François Martin (navigator) =

French sailor

François Martin de Vitré (French pronunciation: [fʁɑ̃swa maʁtɛ̃ də vitʁe]; 1575 – 1631) was a French sailor and adventurer from the town of Vitré who traveled to East Asia as far as Sumatra from 1601 to 1603. He was the first Frenchman to write an account of travels to the Far East. He was, however, preceded to the Far East by several French traders, such as Jean Parmentier in 1529. De Vitré was the surgeon of his ship.

In December 1600, a French trading company was formed through the association of Saint-Malo, Laval and Vitré, to trade with the Moluccas and Japan. Two ships, the Croissant and the Corbin, were sent around the Cape of Good Hope in May 1601. The Corbin was wrecked in the Maldives, beginning the adventure of François Pyrard de Laval, who managed to return to France in 1611.

The second ship, the Croissant carrying Martin, reached Ceylon and traded with Aceh in Sumatra, but on the return leg was captured by the Dutch at Cape Finisterre.

Martin and another Frenchman, François Pyrard, were among the first Frenchmen to visit India. They went to Surat and also visited the town of Gujarat.

In his Memoires, Martin wrote that the world was learning from China at that time.

On his return, King Henry IV directed Martin to write an account of his travels. They were published in 1604. His account created a strong enthusiasm for commerce with Asia, and from 1604 to 1609, Henry IV attempted to set up a French East India Company on the model of England and the Netherlands.

In 1609, a Malay language dictionary was added to Martin's work, possibly the work of Pierre-Olivier Malherbe, also from Vitré, who was just returning from a 27-year world tour and has a claim to being the first French circumnavigator.

== Works ==
- La Description du premier voyage fait aux Indes orientales par les Français en l'an 1603, contenant les mœurs, les lois, façon de vivre, religions et habits des Indiens, Paris (1604)
- Une Description et Remarque des animaux, épiceries, drogues aromatiques et fruits qui se trouvent aux Indes
- Un Traité du scorbut, qui est une maladie étrange qui survient à ceux qui voyagent en ces contrées, Paris (1609)

== See also ==
- France-Asia relations
