= Claude-Étienne Savary =

Claude-Étienne Savary (1750 in Vitré, Ille-et-Vilaine – 1788) was an orientalist, pioneer of Egyptology and translator of the Qur'an.

== Biography ==
As a child of delicate health, he studied at the college in Rennes, then stayed in Paris where he became friends with Lemonnier, the doctor of "Monsieur", brother of King Louis XVI and later crowned Louis XVIII. Driven by his taste for adventure, he left for Egypt in 1776, where he stayed for three years, successively in Alexandria, Rosetta, Damietta, and Cairo. He visited archaeological sites, notably the pyramids of Giza, and observed the customs of the Egyptians. He then spent nearly two years exploring several islands of the archipelago, particularly Rhodes and Crete. He later published an extensive account of his travels based on his daily interactions with the local population. Speaking Arabic, his account offers a striking contrast to the austere description Volney gave two years later. It is one of the first literary journeys to Egypt, more than a century after François Savary de Brèves but long before François-René de Chateaubriand, Alphonse de Lamartine, or Gustave Flaubert.

He returned to France in the summer of 1781, and in 1783 published a French translation of the Quran. His translation respects the style of the original and its division into verses, as he emphasizes in his preface, contrasting it with that of his predecessor André du Ryer (1647). He also pays homage to Ludovico Marracci's Latin translation (1698), which he cites in the notes. In the Life of Muhammad, which he places at the beginning of the work, he argues for a political Muhammad, who supposedly created the fiction of a divine mission and the revelation of the Quran by God as a tool for his project of regenerating the Arab nation. This translation, written in Egypt, was published in Paris in 1783 in two volumes and was reprinted several times in the following years. A modern edition exists ( Classiques Garnier ), and facsimile reproductions of 18th - century editions are available.

Savary died on February 4, 1788 in Paris. He died from complications of malaria, probably contracted during his stay in Egypt. At the time of his death, Savary was slated to be appointed French consul in Alexandria, Egypt, then part of the Ottoman Empire.

=== Visit to the Great Pyramid of Giza (circa 1777-1778) ===
On October 4, 1777, Savary was sailing on the Nile and, upon seeing the pyramids of Giza, wrote: "Hail to the oldest monuments that have come forth from the hand of men! Their sight inspires religious awe. How many generations have disappeared from the earth since these enormous masses have rested on the foot of the mountain where they sit!"

During his stay in Egypt, Savary immersed himself among the local inhabitants, speaking Arabic and demonstrating a passion for Egypt. In Cairo, nine months after arriving via the Nile, he wrote:

"To avoid being insulted by the populace, and to fulfill the purpose of my journey, I adopted the appearance and clothing of a Turk. My sun-tanned complexion became Egyptian. A shawl covers my head and hides my hair. A long mustache shades my cheeks. Thanks to this metamorphosis, and to my habit of speaking Arabic, I walk through the city, I explore the surrounding area, and I live among these strange people."

He and the Count d'Antragues visited the Great Pyramid of Giza in the dead of night. Around 3:30 in the morning, they arrived at the foot of the pyramid. Torch in hand, they crawled like snakes, according to his own account, to enter the Great Pyramid. A pistol shot was fired; the sound, echoing through the caverns, awakened thousands of bats. Several of their candles were extinguished. The air was stifling. Half an hour after leaving the Great Pyramid, they reached its summit and inscribed their names.

Claude-Étienne Savary subsequently visited the Great Pyramid twice and also climbed to its summit twice. He then relied on the research and plan of Benoît de Maillet, adding his own notes.

== Publications ==
- 1782–1783: Le Coran, traduit de l'arabe, accompagné de notes, et précédé d'un abrégé de la vie de Mahomet, tiré des écrivains orientaux les plus estimés, Paris, Amsterdam, Leyde, etc. chez les libraires associés.
- 1784: Morale de Mahomet, ou Recueil des plus pures maximes du Quran, Goldschnitt, Paris, chez Lamy, Libraire, Quai des Augustins, Dresden, chez les Frères Walther, 1786; anthologie de passages du Coran compatibles avec la morale naturelle.
- 1788: Lettres sur la Grèce, faisant suite de celles de l'Égypte, Onfroy, Paris. Relation de voyage partant d'Alexandrie et concernant surtout les îles de Rhodes, Candie et la Crète.
- 1785–1786: Lettres sur l'Égypte, où l'on offre le parallèle des mœurs anciennes & modernes de ses habitans, où l'on décrit l'état, le commerce, l'agriculture, le gouvernement, l'ancienne religion du pays, & la descente de S. Louis à Damiette, tirée de Joinville & des Auteurs Arabes. 1re édition, Onfroy, Paris. 2e édition, Amsterdam, Leyde, Rotterdam and Utrecht, 1787, 3e édition, Bleuet, 1798. The first two volumes are the account of his journey; the last is devoted to the study of religion and mythology, from the Arabic texts. These letters, addressed to his friend Lemonnier, first had a tremendous vogue and all newspapers gave them the highest praise;
- 1813: Grammaire de la langue arabe vulgaire et littérale; posthumous work extended with some Arab tales by the publisher, Paris, de l'Imprimerie Impériale.

== Gallery ==
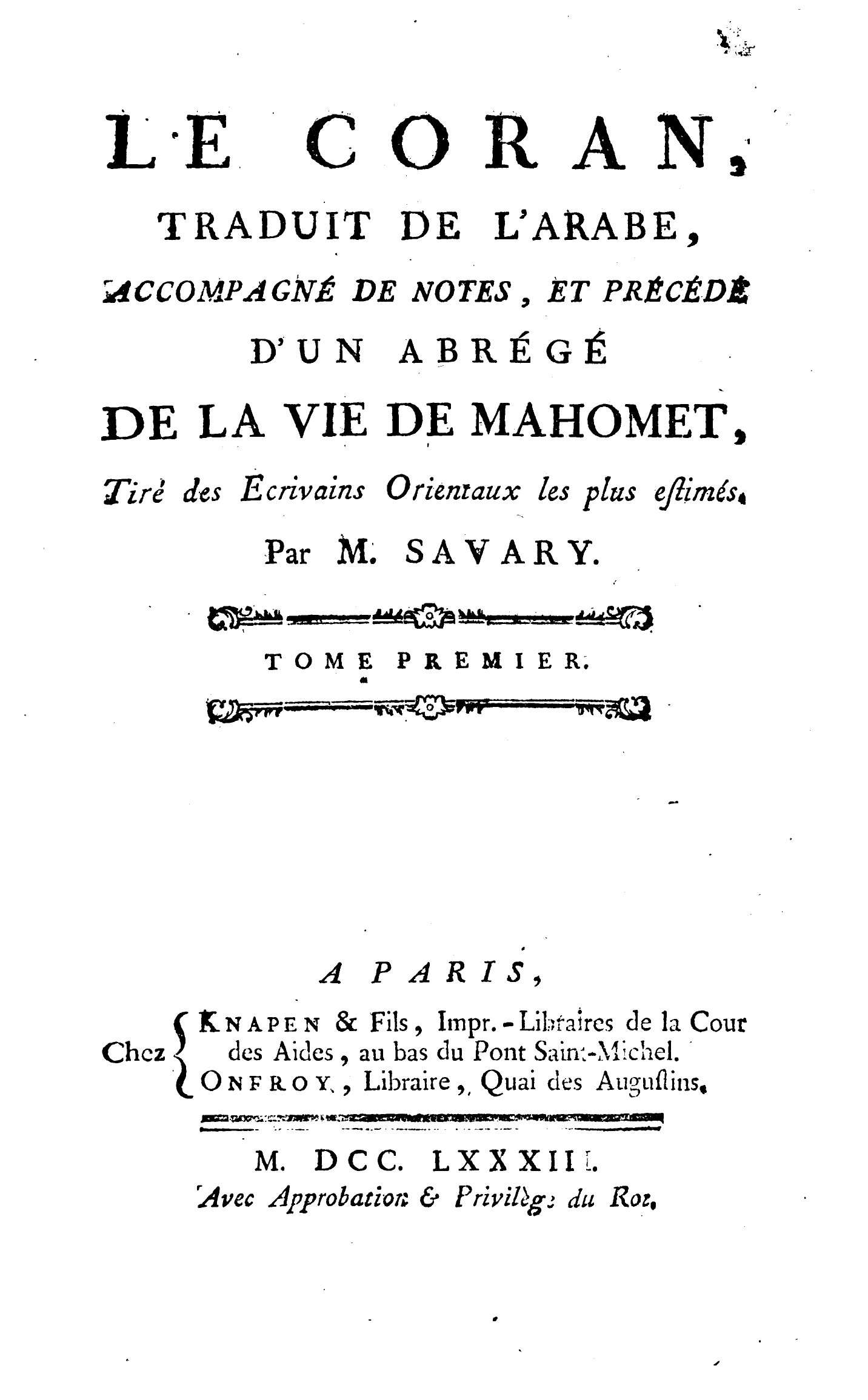
Le Koran - 1783 edition

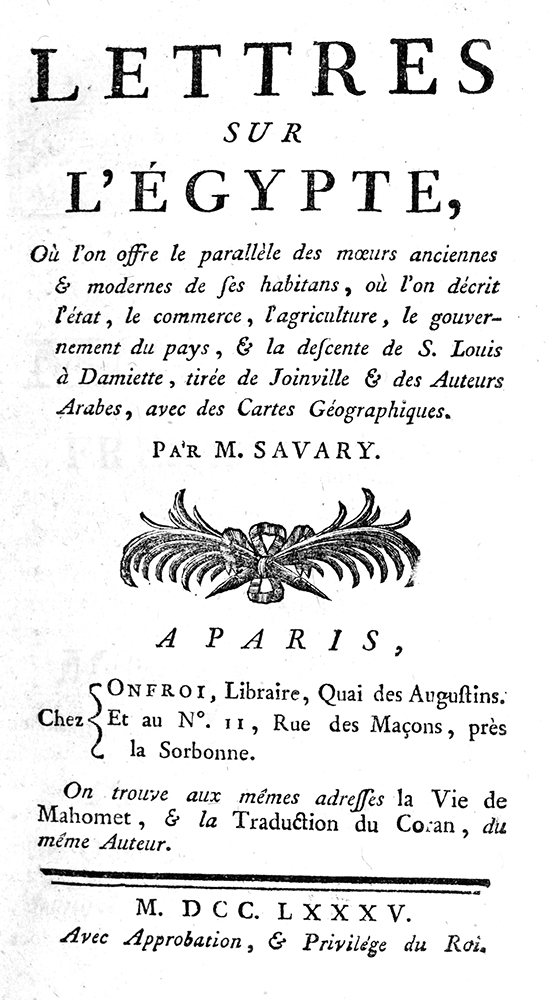
Lettres sur l'Égypte... - 1785 edition

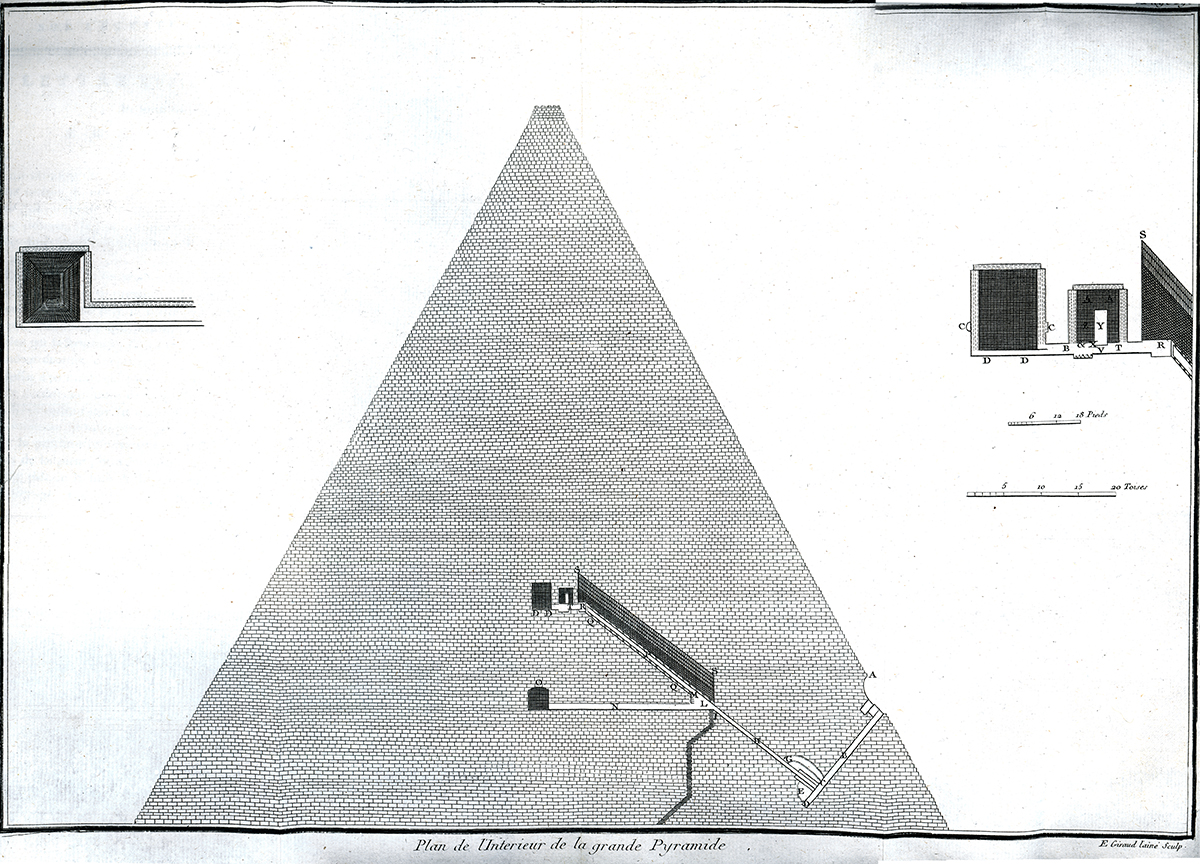
Drawing of the interior of the great pyramid in 1785

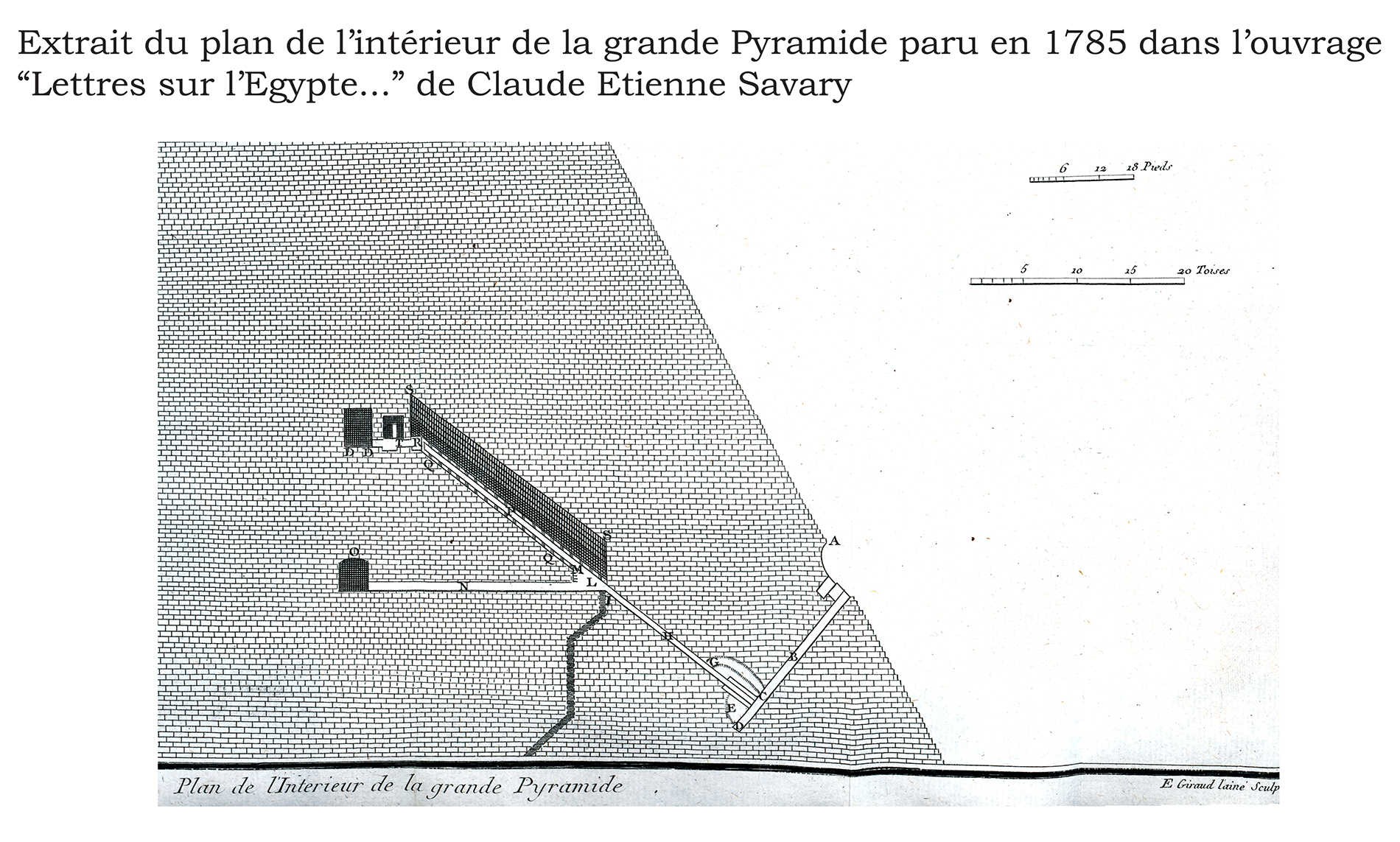
Extract from the internal plan of the Great Pyramid - 1785
