= Fortifications of Vitré =

City Wall in Vitré, Ille-et-Vilaine

Coordinates: 48.133331°N 1.2°W

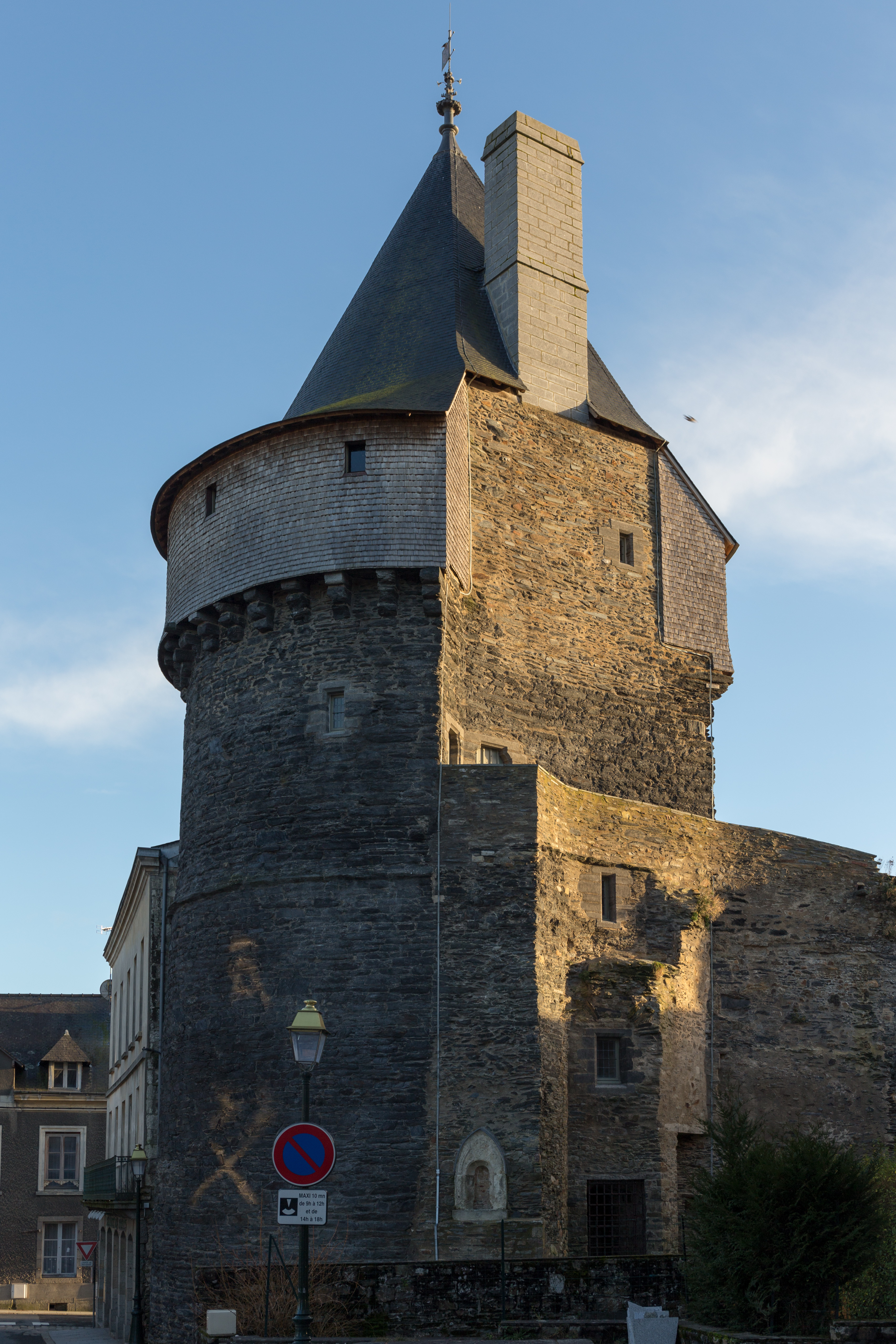
- Tour de la Bridole
- Location: Brittany, France
- Nearest city: Vitré, Ille-et-Vilaine
- Built: 1220–1591 (original fortifications)
- Built for: Baron André III
- Demolished: 19th c. (south ramparts)
- Rebuilt: 19th, 20th, 21st c.
- Architectural style(s): Military
- Governing body: Monument Historique

The ramparts of Vitré are the fortifications built between the 13th and 17th centuries to protect the town of Vitré and Brittany against the French Kingdom. The city was located near the Breton border, near Maine, Anjou and Normandy. The ramparts cover an area of 8 hectares (20 acres) with a length of 500 metres (1,600 ft) and 200 metres (660 ft) width. The fortifications of the thirteenth century are the best preserved in Brittany.

== Situation ==
The ramparts follow the contours of the rocky plateau where the Château de Vitré and the urban nucleus developing around the Church of Notre-Dame Église Notre-Dame de Vitré were built. The construction of the ramparts was made according to the defensive strengths and constraints of the relief.

The town is located on a plateau with very deep valleys. To the north flows the river Vilaine where there was a pond, swamps and a 30 metres (98 ft) high talus. The views over the landscape were excellent. In the south, the depression created by the Vernouzet Vernouzet stream was an additional protection. The defensive weak point was to the east, in the direction of Laval and the French Kingdom, because access was so easy.

Vitré is located in the Armorican Massif, at the interface of zones of beige sandstone and schist (argillites, black micaceous siltites, locally with ferruginous oolites). The ramparts were built with the materials available on site. As a consequence, the exploitation of the stone has allowed the creation of large ditches to the south and east of the walled town of the order of 12 metres (39 ft) depth and a width of 20 metres (66 ft). A small supermarket in the rue de la Borderie has two levels of basement up to the level of the old ditches and illustrates these dimensions.

The inventory of the Baronnie de Vitré in 1681 testifies to the presence of springs and fountains in the moat, used by the inhabitants of the districts for laundry, orchards and gardens.

== History ==
The ramparts were built in 1240 by Baron Andrew III and reinforced with the development of artillery in the 15th century.

Vitré was a Protestant city, rich and prosperous. But during the French Wars of Religion, attacks by the Catholic Leagues destroyed a part of the towers and ramparts east of the ancient city. At the end of the 16th century, a bastion was built in 1591.

The fortifications were destroyed in the south in the 19th century to connect the old town with the modern neighborhood. The Vitré railway station arrived in 1857.

In 1987, the Tour des Claviers was discovered during the construction of a residential building. The old town is classified as a "remarkable heritage site" and the town council engages in the renovation of this ramparts (Tour de la Bridole). All fortifications were classified "historical monuments" on January 15, 2014.

The remains of walls and towers are the most outstanding to the north and east of the walled town, along the Promenade du Val with an exceptional viewpoint.

== Plan of fortifications ==
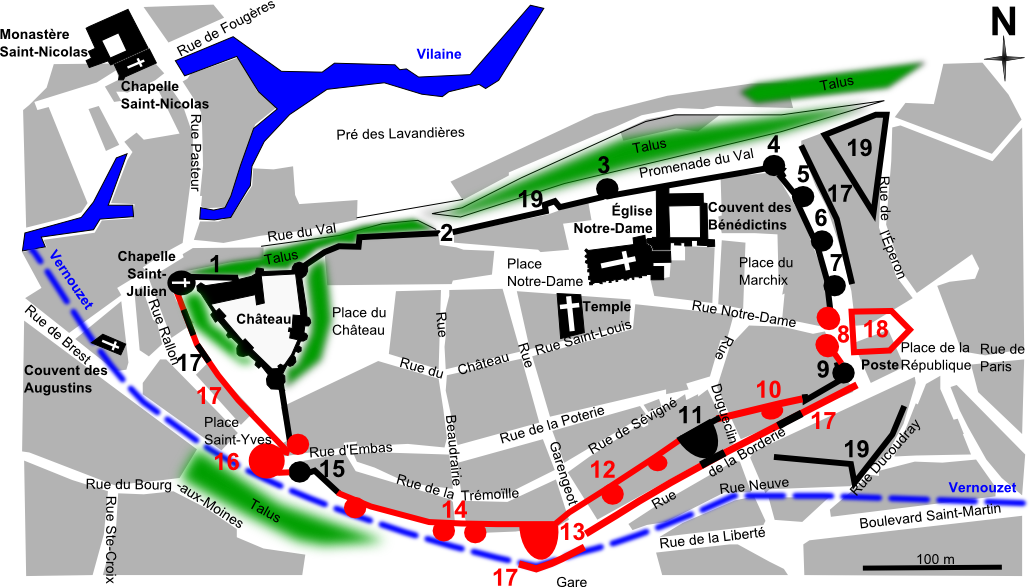
Map of the fortifications

Fortifications of Vitré
Saved components	Demolished components
1 : St. Julien Chapel and Faussebraye (North)
2 : St. Pierre Postern
3 : Chèvres Tower
4 : Rompue or la Fresnaye Tower
5 : Géomètre Tower
6 : Doré Tower
7 : Prisonniers Tower (Monument historique)
	8 : En Haut Gate (between rue Notre-Dame and place de la République)
9 : La Bridole Tower (or Coin Tower or Marché Tower) (Monument historique)
	10: half-towers
11: Claviers Tower
	12: Sévigné Tower
	13: Gâtesel Gate
	14: Beaucé or "Horseshoe" Tower
15: Embas Gate (South Tower) (Monument historique)	15: Embas Gate (North Tower)
	16: Barbican (built on the St. Yves Place)
	17: Counterscarp (Car park rue Rallon)
	18: Barbican
19: Bastion

== Gallery ==
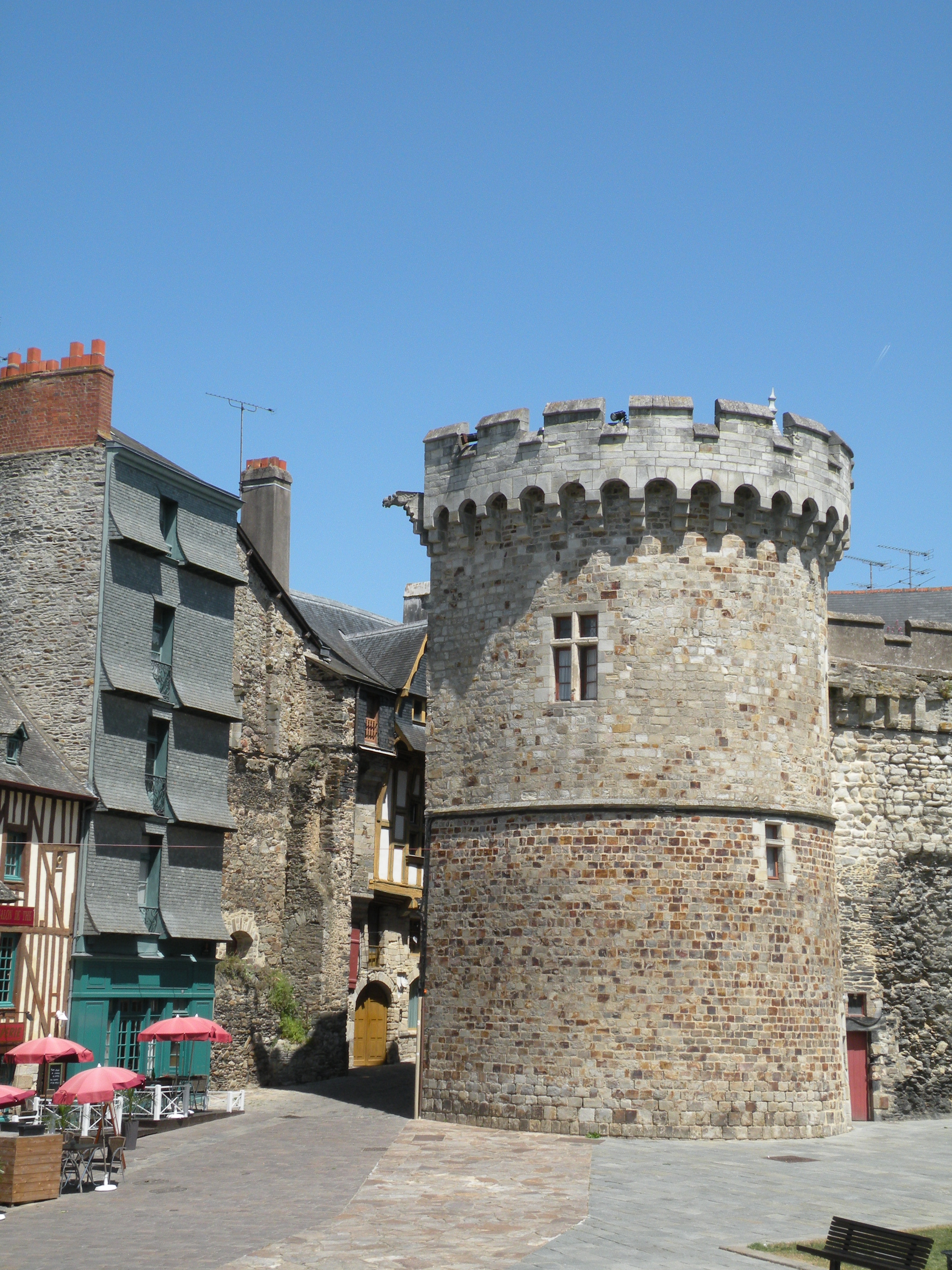
Embas Gate (Porte d'Embas).

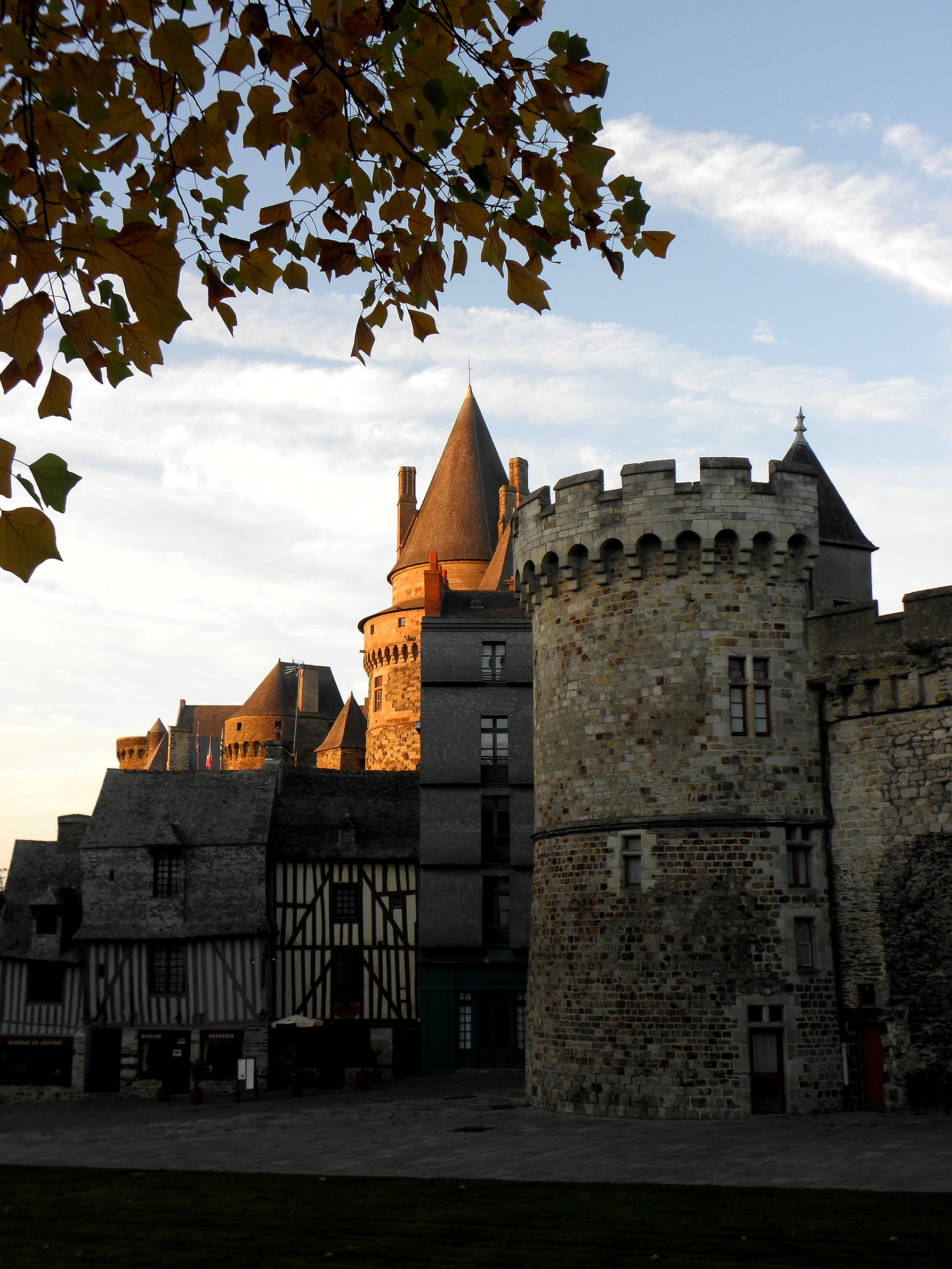
Embas Gate (Porte d'Embas) and old houses (15th c.).

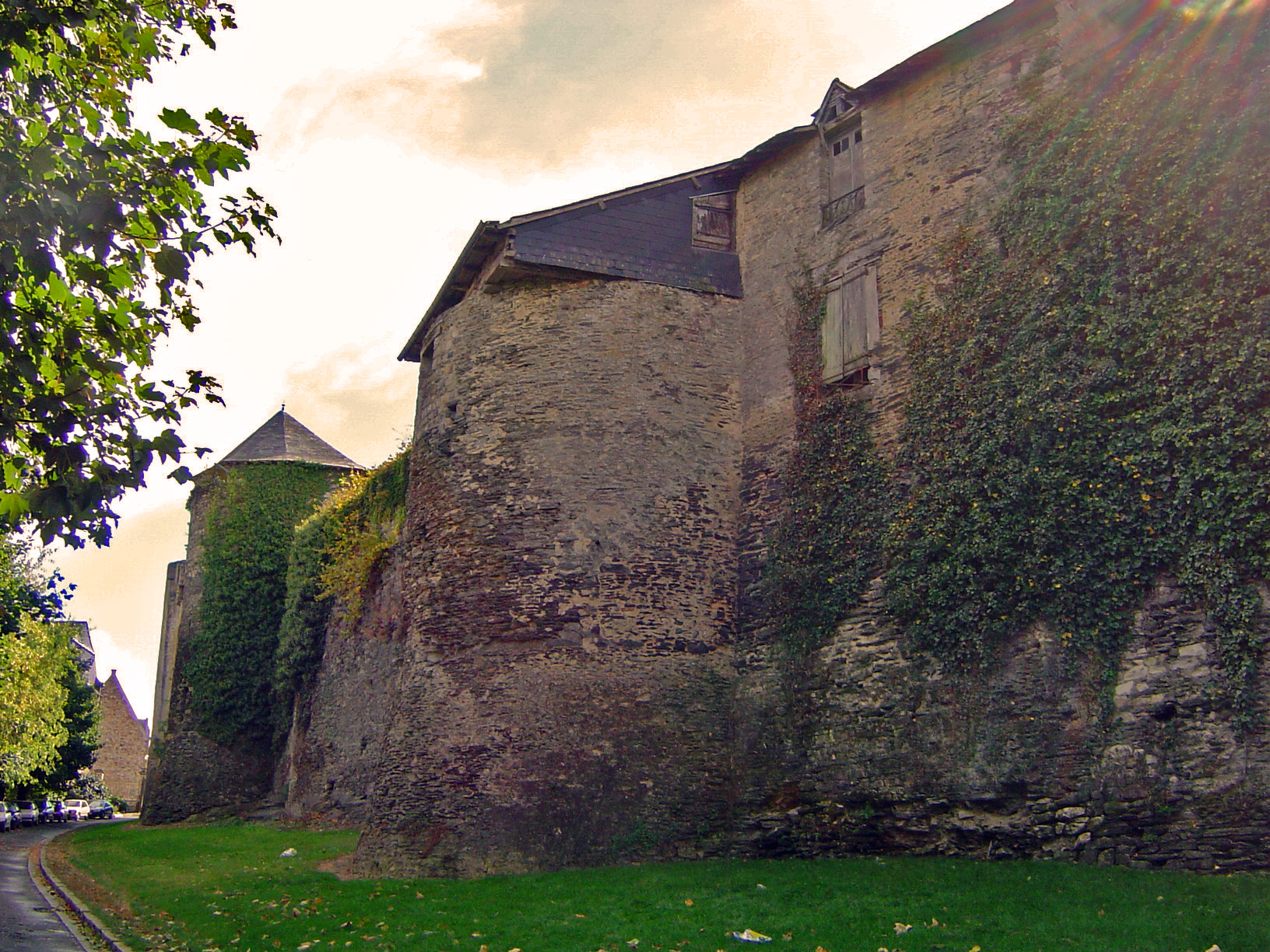
East fortifications built (13th c.).
