= Jean-Joseph Rallier des Ourmes =

French mathematician (1701–1771)

- Born: 26 May 1707; Brittany, France
- Died: 23 June 1771 (aged 64); Vitré, France
- Occupations: Mathematician; Agronomist
- Spouse: Françoise Pélagie Huguet verheiratet

Jean-Joseph Rallier des Ourmes (26 May 1701 – 23 June 1771) was an 18th-century French mathematician.

The son of Julien François Rallier (1645–1709) and Marie de Baudouard (died 1705), Rallier became "conseiller au présidial de Rennes" and worked on mathematical issues but also with agricultural problems. In 1757, he was one of the founders of the Société d'agriculture, de commerce et des arts de Bretagne.

His numerous writings are scattered in various collections, in particular in the Encyclopédie, where he provided 14 articles on arithmetics, and in the Mémoires des savants étrangers of the Académie des sciences.

He died, aged 70, in his château de la Rivière, near Vitré.

== Works (selection) ==
- Mémoire sur les quarrés magiques. In Mémoires de Mathématique et de Physique. Vol. 4, 1763, ZDB-ID 447970-1, (p. 196–241).
- Usage des divisions d'un nombre pour résoudre un problème d'arithmetique. In: Mémoires de Mathématique et de Physique. Vol. 5, 1768, (p. 479–484).
- Methode facile pour découvir tous les nombres premiers contenus dans un cours illimité de la suite des impairs & tout d'un temps les diviseurs simples de ceux qui ne le font pas. In: Mémoires de Mathématique et de Physique. Vol. 5, 1768, (p. 485–499).
- Méthode nouvelle de division quand le dividende est multiple du diviseur, & d' extraction quand la puissance est parfaite. In: Mémoires de Mathématique et de Physique. Vol. 5, 1768, (p. 550–574).

== Sources ==
- Ferdinand Hoefer, Nouvelle Biographie générale, vol.37, Paris, Firmin-Didot, 1824, (p. 23–4).
- Pierre Larousse, Grand Dictionnaire universel du XIXe, vol.13, Paris, Administration du grand Dictionnaire universel, (p. 663).
