= Hugh of Bayeux =

Bishop of Bayeux, Normandy (988–1049)

Portrait of Hugh of Bayeux

Hugh of Ivry or Hugh of Bayeux (French: Hugues d'Ivry; 988 – 1049) was bishop of Bayeux and count of Ivry from the beginning of the 11th century.

== Family ==
Hugh was the son of Ralph, Count of Ivry, and his first wife Eremburga of Canville. His sister Emma, who married Osbern the Steward (French: Osbern de Crépon), Seneschal of Normandy, became abbess of the abbey of Saint-Amand in Rouen on the death of her husband. His half brother was John of Ivry, bishop of Avranches, later archbishop of Rouen.

== Biography ==
Hugh was elevated to the bishopric of Bayeux in 1011 at the latest, as evidenced by a diploma in favour of the abbey of Saint-Ouen in Rouen. He restored the temporalities of the cathedral and proceeded to translate the relics of Saints Rasyphus and Ravennus.

According to Orderic Vitalis, he held the castle of Ivry against the dukes of Normandy. William of Jumièges records his revolt against Robert the Magnificent. Kept away from the duke's council, he armed Ivry and left for France to reinforce the garrison. Robert took the opportunity to besiege the castle and instal a ducal garrison there. Having gone into exile, Hugh was restored to grace before November 1032, and witnessed the deed of foundation of Cerisy Abbey. In the county of Ivry, he recovered some of his prerogatives which he later sought to transmit to his illegitimate children.

Following a fire, Hugh decided to rebuild the cathedral, which was completed by his successor, Odo de Conteville. The date range of its construction, according to Jean Vallery-Radot, extends from 1040 to 1080. Orderic Vitalis gives full credit for its construction to Odo de Conteville, but he is contradicted by Robert of Torigni.

Hugh died in 1049, returning from his trip to the Council of Reims held by Pope Leo IX. He is buried in Bayeux Cathedral against the wall on the north side, in a marble tomb.

== Patrimony ==
When Hugh's father Ralph died around 1015, most of his property fell to him, including the county and castle of Ivry. He also inherited the comital title though it never appeared in documents, just as for his cousin Robert the Dane, archbishop of Rouen, for Évreux. His property was located in four areas: the forest of Vièvre in Lieuvin, Ralph's estates in Hiémois, those north of the Seine and his possessions in the Évrecin. His properties in the Pays de Caux were concentrated on the coast of Petit-Caux and in Vieux-Rouen-sur-Bresle. According to David Bates, he also received estates around Breteuil from his father.

Hugh granted to Raoul Taisson the episcopal customs of twelve churches located in Hiémois before 1047–1049, when Raoul granted them to Fontenay Abbey. Around 1042–1049 he granted to the abbey of Saint-Amand in Rouen, of which his sister Emma was abbess, Boos and its dependencies, Bouquelon and Celloville; then, around 1020 –1030 at the request of his knight Ralph, the land of Rouvray and its church to Jumièges Abbey. On this occasion he exempted the monks from tonlieu on the stretch of the river between the entrance to the valley and Fontaine-sous-Jouy. He granted the church of Saint-Aquilin-de-Pacy to the abbey of Saint-Ouen in Rouen. In 1034 he exchanged the land of Argences with Fécamp Abbey for one hundred hôtes, twenty free men and the churches of Biville-sur-Mer, Brunville and Penly.

== Children ==
He had two illegitimate children:

- Roger (died around 1072);
- Albreda (French: Aubrée or Alberède), claimant to her father's comital title, married (1) to Robert I de Goël and (2) to Albert de Cravent (confirmed by Orderic Vitalis)
