= Sprota =

10th-century wife and mother of Norman dukes

Sprota was an early 10th century woman of obscure origin who became wife "in the Viking fashion" (more danico) of William I, Duke of Normandy, by her becoming mother of his successor, Duke Richard I. After the death of William, she married a wealthy landowner, Esperleng, by him having another son, Norman nobleman Rodulf of Ivry.

== Life ==
The first mention of Sprota is by her contemporary, Flodoard of Reims. Although he does not name her, he identifies her under the year [943] as the mother of "William’s son [Richard] born of a Breton concubine". Elisabeth van Houts wrote "on this reference rests the identification of Sprota, William Longsword’s wife 'according to the Danish custom', as of Breton origin", and this could apply to someone of native Breton, Scandinavian, or Frankish ethnicity, the latter being the most likely based on her name spelling. The first to provide her name was William of Jumièges, writing in the second half of the 11th century. The name Sprota seems to contain the same root as the anthroponym Sprot found in the Domesday Book and in various place-names both in England such as Sprotbrough (Sproteburg 1086) and in Normandy like the Eprevilles, such as Epreville (Sprovilla 1025), which is at the same time Anglo-Saxon as Sprota, Anglo-Scandinavian and Scandinavian (see Sproti).

The non-Christian nature of her relationship with William became a source of ridicule for her son Richard. The French King Louis "abused the boy with bitter insults", calling him "the son of a whore who had seduced another woman's husband."

At the time of the birth of her first son Richard, Sprota was living in her own household at Bayeux, under William's protection. William, having just quashed a rebellion at Pré-de Bataille (c. 936), (Note: The date of the battle and as such Richard's birth is commonly given as c.936 but according to the Annals of Jumièges (ed. Laporte, p. 53) Richard was baptized in 938. See Van Houts, Gesta Normannorum Ducum, 1992, 1:78-9 n. 5.) received the news by a messenger that Sprota had just given birth to a son; delighted at the news William ordered his son to be baptized and given the personal name of Richard. William's steward Boto became the boy's godfather.

After the death of William Longsword and the captivity of her son Richard, she had been "collected" from her dangerous situation by the "immensely wealthy" Esperleng. Robert of Torigni identified Sprota's second husband (Note: Probably also in the Viking or Danish fashion of marriage. See: Searle, Predatory Kinship, 1988, 291 n. 2) as Esperleng, a wealthy landowner who operated mills at Pîtres.

== Family ==
By William I Longsword she was the mother of:

- Richard I, Duke of Normandy

By Esperling of Vaudreuil she was the mother of:

- Rodulf, Count of Ivry
- several daughters who married Norman magnates

== Genealogy ==
Rollo of Normandy
Theobald I Count of Blois | Luitgarde of Vermandois | William I Longsword of Normandy | Sprota | Esperling of Vaudreuil
Emma of Paris | Richard I of Normandy | Gunnor | Herfast of Crépon | Rodulf of Ivry | Aubrey of Canville | several daughters
Richard II of Normandy | Robert archbishop of Rouen | others | Osbern the Steward | Emma of Ivrea | Hugh; Bishop of Bayeux | John; Archbishop of Rouen
Dukes of Normandy; Kings of England | William; Fitz Osbern; Earl of Hereford | Osbern; Fitz Osbern; Bishop of Exeter

== Sources ==
- Emily Albu, The Normans in their histories: propaganda, myth and subversion, (Boydell Press, Woodbridge, 2001).
- David Crouch, The Normans: The History of a Dynasty, (Hambledon Continuum, 2007).
- Steven Fanning and Bernard S. Bachrach, trans., The Annals of Flodoard of Reims, 916-966, (University of Toronto Press, 2011).
- Katherine S. B. Keats-Rohan, 'Poppa of Bayeux and Her Family', The American Genealogist, vol. 72 (July–October 1997), pp. 187–204.
- Delphine Lemaître Philippe, La Normandie an xe siècle, suivie des Recherches sur les droits des rois de France au patronage d'Illeville, (A. Perone, Rouen, 1845).
- Philip Lyndon Reynolds, Marriage in the Western Church, (Leiden; New York: E.J. Brill, 1994).
- Detlev Schwennicke, Europäische Stammtafeln: Stammtafeln zur Geschichte der Europäischen Staaten, Neue Folge, Band II: Die Ausserdeutschen Staaten Die Regierenden Häuser der Übrigen Staaten Europas(Marburg, Germany: Verlag von J. A. Stargardt, 1984).
- Eleanor Searle, Predatory Kinship and the Creation of Norman Power, 840-1066 (University of California Press, Berkeley, 1988).
- Elizabeth M. C. Van Houts, trans., The Gesta Normannorum Ducum of William of Jumièges, Orderic Vitalis, and Robert of Torigni, (Clarendon Press, Oxford, 1992).
- Elizabeth M. C. Van Houts, trans., The Normans in Europe, (Manchester University Press, 2000).
