= Anslech de Bricquebec =

Anslech or Anslec de Bricquebec (active in the 930s and 940s) played a major political role in the first days of the duchy of Normandy, though the sources on him are rather opaque.

== In the Anglo-Norman chronicles ==
Around 1000, Dudo of Saint-Quentin evoked Anslech as one of the three secretarii to the jarl of the Normans, William I (v.927-942). A later source, le Roman de Rou, explains that Anslech supported William when Rioulf began an important rebellion against him.

We see the same figure again in the writings of William of Jumièges. After the assassination of William I, Anslech, Raoul Taisson l'Ancien and Bernard the Dane formed what William of Jumièges called "guardians of the whole duchy of Normandy", awaiting the majority of the new duke Richard. In 943, they welcomed the king of the Franks, Louis IV to Rouen, who came as overlord to receive the homage of the inhabitants of Rouen.

== Rise and fall ==
The sagas from Norway and the islands make Anslech a Norman noble, Danish or Norwegian in origin but always from the old Viking nobility. Later Norman traditions made him son of a supposed nephew of the Norman founder, Rollo, William I's father.

All the same, his descendants continue to be discussed. A tradition - held since the 17th century, though with no evidence - considers him as the ancestor of the families of Montfort and Bertran via his son Tursten of Bastembourg. Finally, he is traditionally presented as the founder of the castle of Bricquebec in Cotentin (perhaps at the beginning of the 10th century), from which comes his nickname Anslech of Bricquebec, though this too is an assumption.

== Sources ==
- Dudo of Saint-Quentin, De moribus et actis primorum Normanniae ducum, Ed. Jules Lair, Caen, F. Le Blanc-Hardel, 1865
- William of Jumièges, History of the Normans, ed. Guizot, Brière, 1826, Livre IV, p. 79 (French translation of Gesta Normannorum ducum written c.1172)
