= Raoul Taisson =

Taisson le Ancien, or Old Badger, was a close companion of William Longsword and played a major political role in the early days of the Duchy of Normandy.

== In the Anglo-Norman chronicles ==
Dudo St Quentin and William of Jumièges mention Badger as one of the three Secretarii to Longsword, along with Anslech de Bricquebec and Bernard the Dane. All three served as guardians to Longsword's son Richard the Fearless during his minority.

== Origin of Name ==
Trisoun, for Tesson or Taisson, is the Norman-French for 'Badger.'

The Tessons, Lords of Cinglais, one of the most powerful houses of Normandy, were first seated near Angouleme (from whence their Gothic origin may be inferred), and distinguished by feats of arms against the Saracens. "They obtained their sirname, the badger, from their peculiar talent of burrowing or fixing their claws wherever they could gain possession; a significant, if not a noble epithet.

== Modern reconstructions ==
It has been suggested that Old Badger may have been a muwallad or mozarab involved in the rebellions of Umar ibn Hafsun against Abd al-Rahman III, where he performed his "feats of arms against the Saracens" and gained his reputation.
