= Rue du Pré de la Bataille =

Street in Rouen, France

Rue du Pré-de-la-Bataille
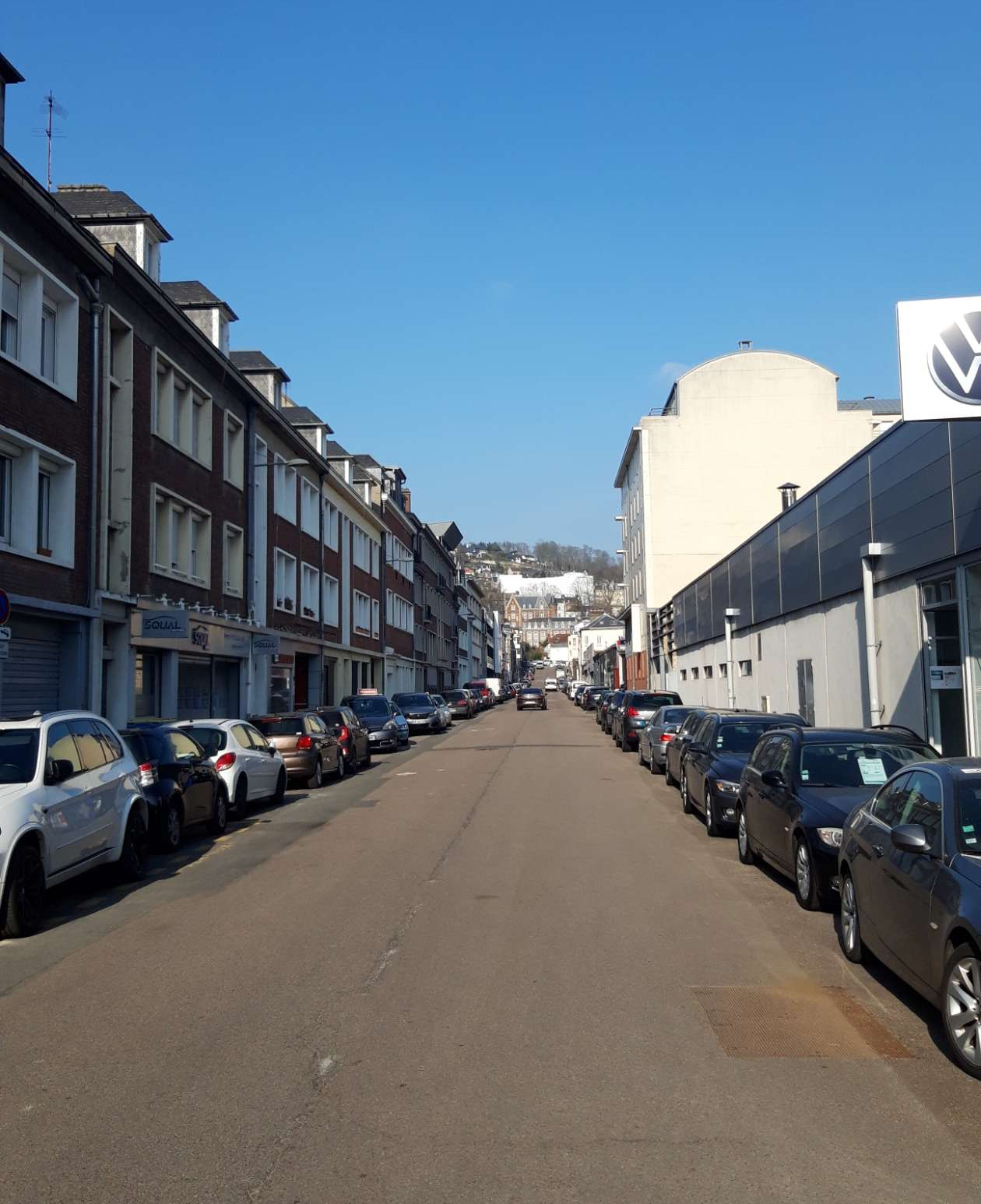
- End of rue du Pré-de-la-Bataille in 2021.
- Interactive map of Rue du Pré-de-la-Bataille
- Former name: rue du Champ-de-Foire
- Type: Street
- Length: 390 m
- Area: 5 460
- Quarter: Pasteur-Madeleine

Rue du Pré-de-la-Bataille (French pronunciation: [ʁy dy pʁe də la bataj]) is a public thoroughfare in the French commune of Rouen. Located in the western part of the city, it belongs to the Pasteur-Madeleine district. Straight and 390 m long, it runs perpendicular to the right bank of the Seine.

Its name reflects the memory of a medieval battle that took place around 934 between the Norman chieftains Guillaume Longue-Épée and Riulf in a meadow at the entrance to the town. The meadow became known as Pré de la Bataille. In the 18th century, it became a fairground bordered by a street, which Rouen's municipal council decided to name rue du Pré-de-la-Bataille in 1833.

This odonym is highly unusual; indeed, the humanist spirit of the 19th century sometimes evokes medieval values, but only exceptionally does it choose a place name.

During the 19th century, the street doubled in length and became increasingly urbanized, with many factories and workshops moving in. In the 21st century, rue du Pré-de-la-Bataille is mainly lined with office and retail buildings in its southern section, and mostly residential in its northern section. An association of the same name has its headquarters here. Having played an important social role at the end of the 19th century, it is now dedicated to the integration of mentally handicapped people.

== Location and access ==
Rue du Pré-de-la-Bataille is located in Rouen. It stands in place of the former Pré de la Bataille, which later became part of the faubourg Cauchoise. It now belongs to the Pasteur-Madeleine district.

Slightly ascending and perfectly straight, this street is 390 m long. Its south-south-west - north-northeast orientation makes it perpendicular to the right bank of the Seine. It begins at the intersection with avenue du Mont-Riboudet, which runs in the same direction as the river, and ends in rue Prosper-Soyer, where it forms a right angle with the latter. The roads that join it are perpendicular. These are rue Émile-Leudet, rue de Constantine, rue du Contrat-social and rue Pillore.

== Origin of the name ==
Rue du Pré-de-la-Bataille takes its name from the site of a battle that took place around 934. The battle took place in a meadow on the outskirts of the town between the Normans led by Guillaume Longue-Épée and those led by Riulf, Count of Cotentin.

== History ==
=== Medieval battle ===
Around 934, the chief of the Normans of the Seine and Count of Rouen, Guillaume Longue-Épée, allied himself with the Franks through marriage. This led to the formation of an anti-foreign party. It was led by Riulf - also of Scandinavian descent - Count of Cotentin, at the head of several other Norman barons. In their eyes, the jarl was forging alliances such that foreigners risked entering the Court and Council, or stripping them of their possessions. Guillaume Longue-Épée, encouraged by Anslech de Bricquebec, Bernard le Danois and Bothon, Count of Bessin, was forced to take on an army of several thousand men with 300 soldiers. He confronted them in a meadow at the foot of Mont-aux-Malades and the city walls of Rouen, emerging victorious.

=== Emergence of the locality ===
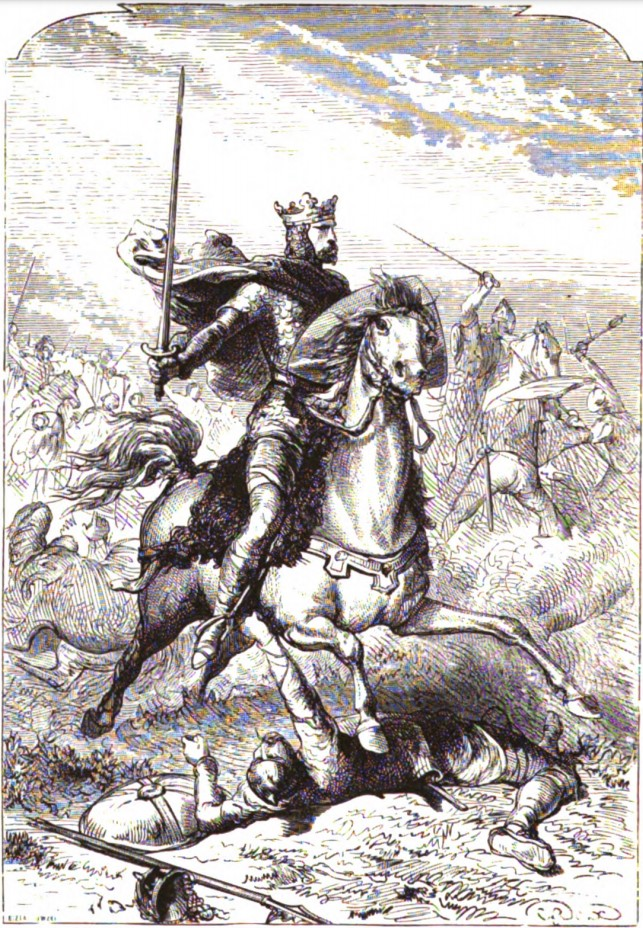
Guillaume Longue-Épée confronts Riulf on the future site of Pré de la Bataille. c. 1866.

As early as 1020-1029, Dudon de Saint-Quentin attests to the fighting and testifies to the presence of a meadow at the battle site: "Locus autem, in quo bellum mirabile fuit, dicitur usque in præsentem diem ad Pratum-Belli". (The very spot where this incredible battle took place is still known today as "Pré de la Bataille".)

A little over a century later, in 1160-1170, Wace's Roman de Rou recounts the events and ensures that the name of the place where they took place will live on:

"Beaucoup moururent de douleur et de honte sur le champ;

Il s'en noya tant dans la Seine, que nul n'en sut le compte,

[…]

Des trois cents chevaliers, que Guillaume Longue-Épée mena,

Ce fut la volonté de Dieu, il n'y laissa aucun mort,

[…]

La joie fut grande à Rouen, quand Riulf fut vaincu,

[…]

Le lieu fut appelé le Pré de la Bataille;

Encor dure li nuns, ne fu puis remuez"

Following the event, the meadow became a locality and took the name Pré de la Bataille for several centuries. It then extended west of Rouen, on one side from the foot of the Saint-Gervais heights to the Seine, and on the other from Rouen's ramparts to the Yonville valley. Until 1419, according to Jean Oursel, the Porte du Pré was in existence as "par cette porte on alloi au Pré de la Bataille, pour les lavandières ". This gate leads to the meadows below the Jacobins convent19. In 1420, King Henry V of England, victorious after the siege of Rouen, granted himself "a considerable space on the banks of the Seine, next to the Pré de la Bataille gate" and erected a tower called Mal s'y frotte, the first element of the Vieil-Palais.

In 1520, both the Pré de la Bataille and the Clos Saint-Marc N 8 were considered as potential hospital sites. In fact, the linen of plague sufferers, like that of other patients, was transported to the Pré de la Bataille quay, where Hôtel-Dieu had a laundry.

In 1731, mention is made of a gate named Pré-de-la-Bataille. In reality, this was not a city gate, but a false one.

=== Rue odonym ===
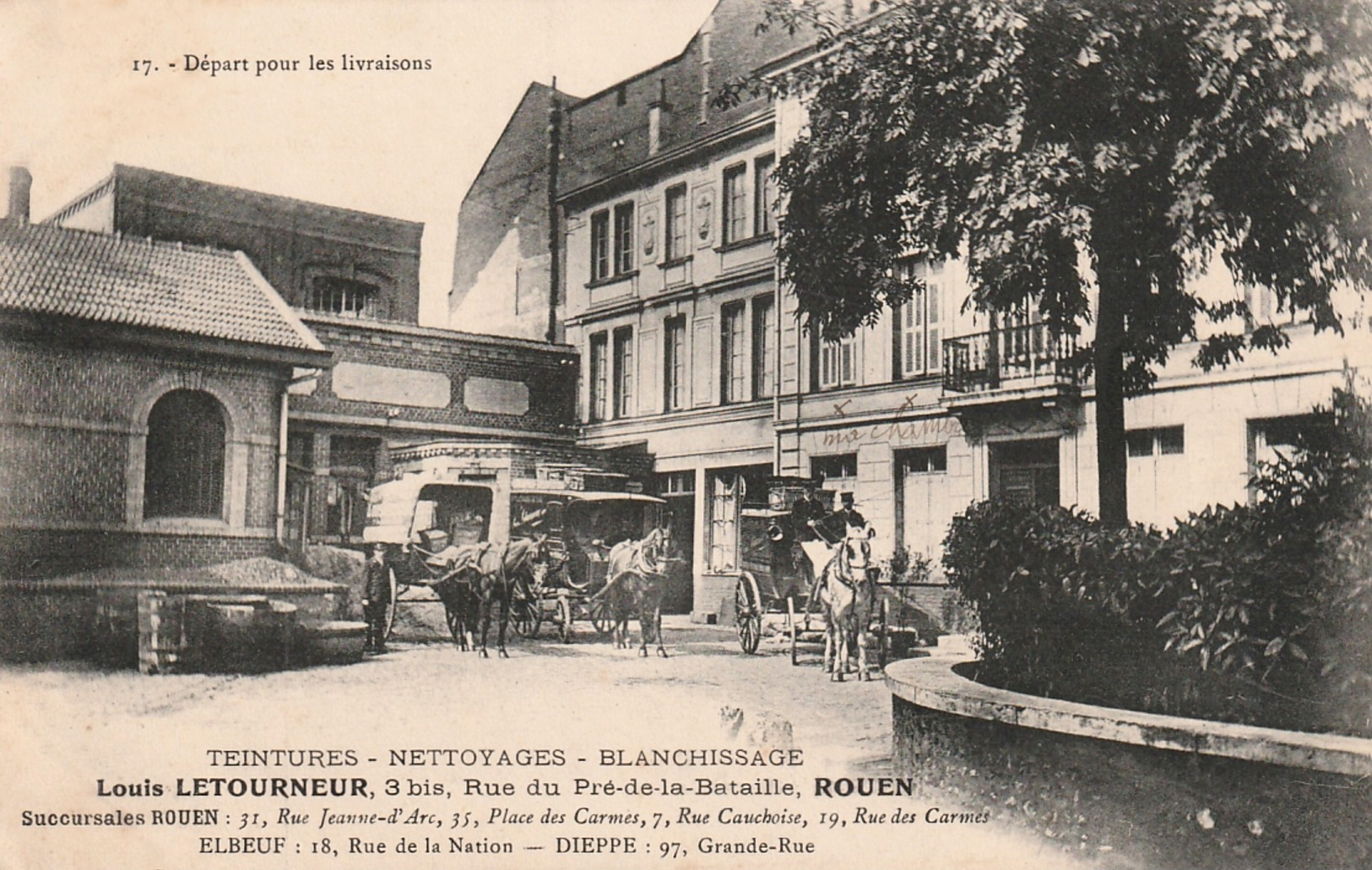
One end of rue du Pré-de-la-Bataille, circa 1905.

Initially, according to maps up to the 18th century, the site was a meadow. On June 18, 1785, part of it became a beverage fairground for cider and perry merchants. This area was mentioned by the Rouen town council on Frimmaire 12, Year X (December 3, 1801). It's only on an 1817 plan that a road called rue du Champ-de-Foire runs along its northern length. It may well have existed previously, as attested by the Napoleonic cadastre ordered in 1807, although the Rouen survey is undated35. The name then gave way to a new road running along the northern width.

During the same meeting, having thus freed up a name, and the place remaining in the collective memory, on April 25, 1833, the municipal councilː

" decided, [...] the street running along the fairgrounds, from the Boulevard du Mont-Riboudet to its northern end, according to the city's plans, will be named Rue du Pré-de-la-Bataille [...]."

This decision is remarkable because, as Pierre-Henri Billy points out, odonyms "formed in contemporary times to recall medieval places [...] are extremely rare, such as rue du Pré-de-la-Bataille [...]". This can be explained by the fact that, according to François Guillet, "in Normandy, as early as the 1800s, scholars and notables [...] embarked on the construction of a monument to provincial origins [...]; far from ending with the Restoration, this quest for origins, in which the search for traces of the Scandinavian past forms part of an archaeology of provincial traditions, took on a particular intensity during the first half of the nineteenth century".

Then, on August 1, 1833, the town council deliberated on extending the street at its northern end, marked by its intersection with rue du Champ-de-FoireN 10, as far as rue Stanislas-Girardin. However, on June 15, 1841, this body decided to carry out only part of the project as far as rue du ChouquetN 12. The owners refused to cede the necessary land free of charge. It was only on an 1848 map that an extension appeared, but it was only a few meters from rue Stanislas-Girardin. On November 5, 1869, after a financial transaction, the council finally decided to remove the narrowing in front of rue du Chouquet. This allowed for an equal width along the entire length. Finally, in 1885, a map shows the complete extension, joining the Quai du Mont-Riboudet to Rue Stanislas-Girardin. This increased the street's length from 235 to 470 m. At least in 1903, as is still the case in 2020, the northern end was condemned. The street then ended at right-angles to rue Prosper-Soyer.

In the 1840s, a small square to the west of the Hôtel-Dieu gardens also recalled the memory of this meadow, but it was not named. Fifty years later, this square was completely overtaken by the urban sprawl of the Faubourg Cauchoise, to make way for a new district. In 1891, the street was paved.

From August 25 to 27, 1944, three days before its liberation by the Canadians, Rouen was bombed from the air to destroy the bridges over the Seine. On the third day, bombs destroyed the lower part of rue du Pré-de-la-Bataille, hitting the twisting millN 13 Baillard-Duboc-Hauville, the Deshayes dyeing, printing, bleaching and tanning chemicals plant, and the Letourneur dye works.

After the war, the street was renumbered.

In the second half of the 20th century, rue du Pré-de-la-Bataille was extended to the Quai de Boisguilbert, which runs alongside the Seine. However, in 2006, the southern section beyond avenue du Mont-Riboudet was renamed rue René-Dragon in memory of the Resistance fighter of the same name, thus losing the 135 m it had previously acquired.

== Remarkable buildings and places of remembrance ==
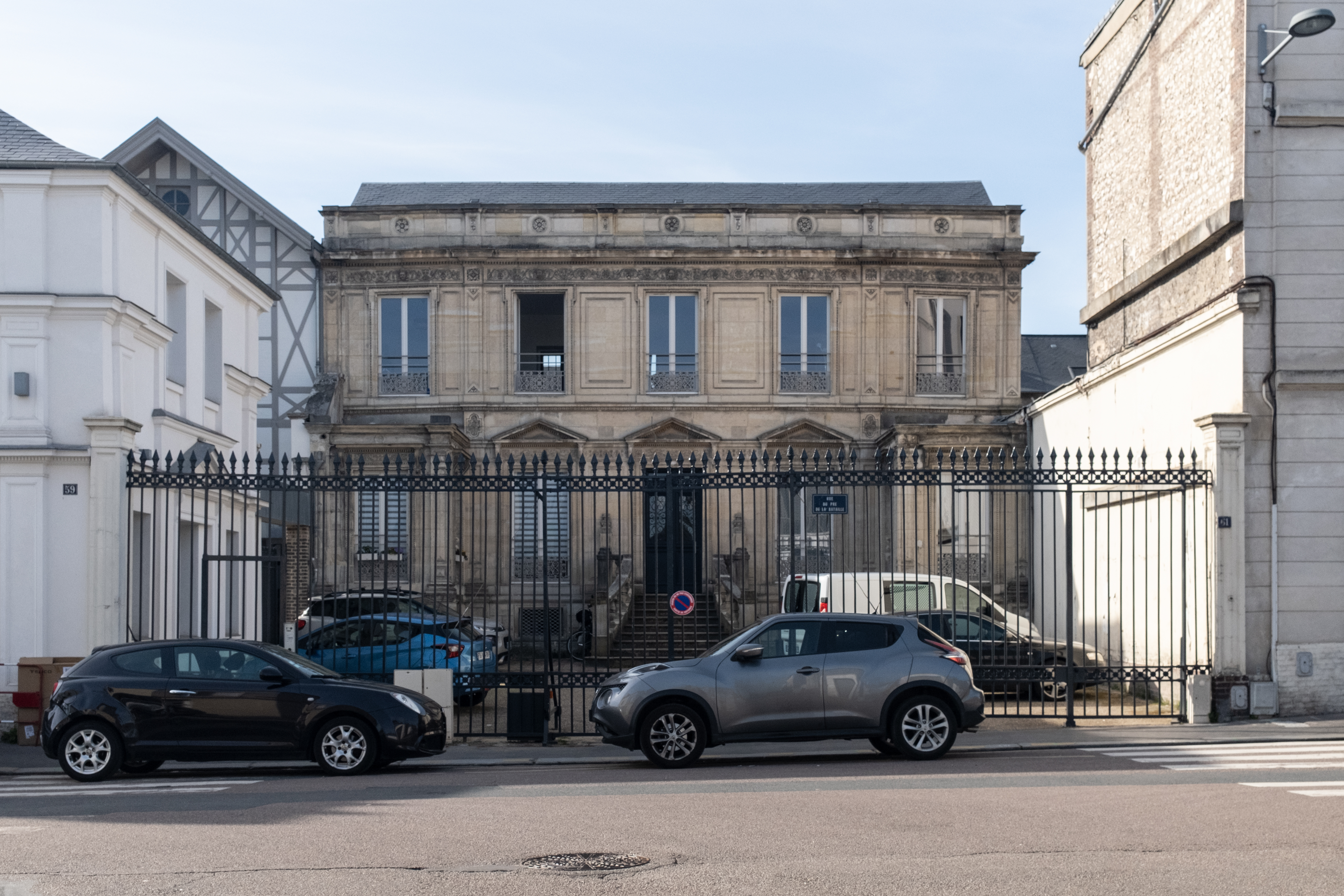
Townhouse, 61 rue du Pré-de-la-Bataille, in 2021.

There don't seem to be any written records of this street's "not very picturesque" architecture. It is close to the Hôtel-Dieu, which is listed as a historic monument historique, and is therefore within a perimeter regulated by the architecte des bâtiments de France. Nevertheless, its urbanization, and that of neighboring streets, is sometimes described as "anarchic". In order to reduce the numerous heat islands, and knowing that a large area of land was becoming available, the municipal council of December 17, 2020 established a study perimeter including the street. This administrative measure gave the city greater control over local development.

The buildings on the southern side of rue du Pré-de-la-Bataille are mainly offices and commercial activities, while beyond rue de Constantine, which marks the halfway point, they are mostly small buildings. The only very different feature is a townhouse at no. 61, facing rue du Contrat-Social. Its façade, set back from the alignment of neighboring buildings due to the presence of a large courtyard of honor enclosed by a gate, is inspired by antique elements, as was fashionable in the early 19th century. It may well be the former no. 27, the home of Ernest Manchon, at the time head of a major manufacture that moved from rue de Tanger to rue de Constantine.

=== Disappearing industries ===
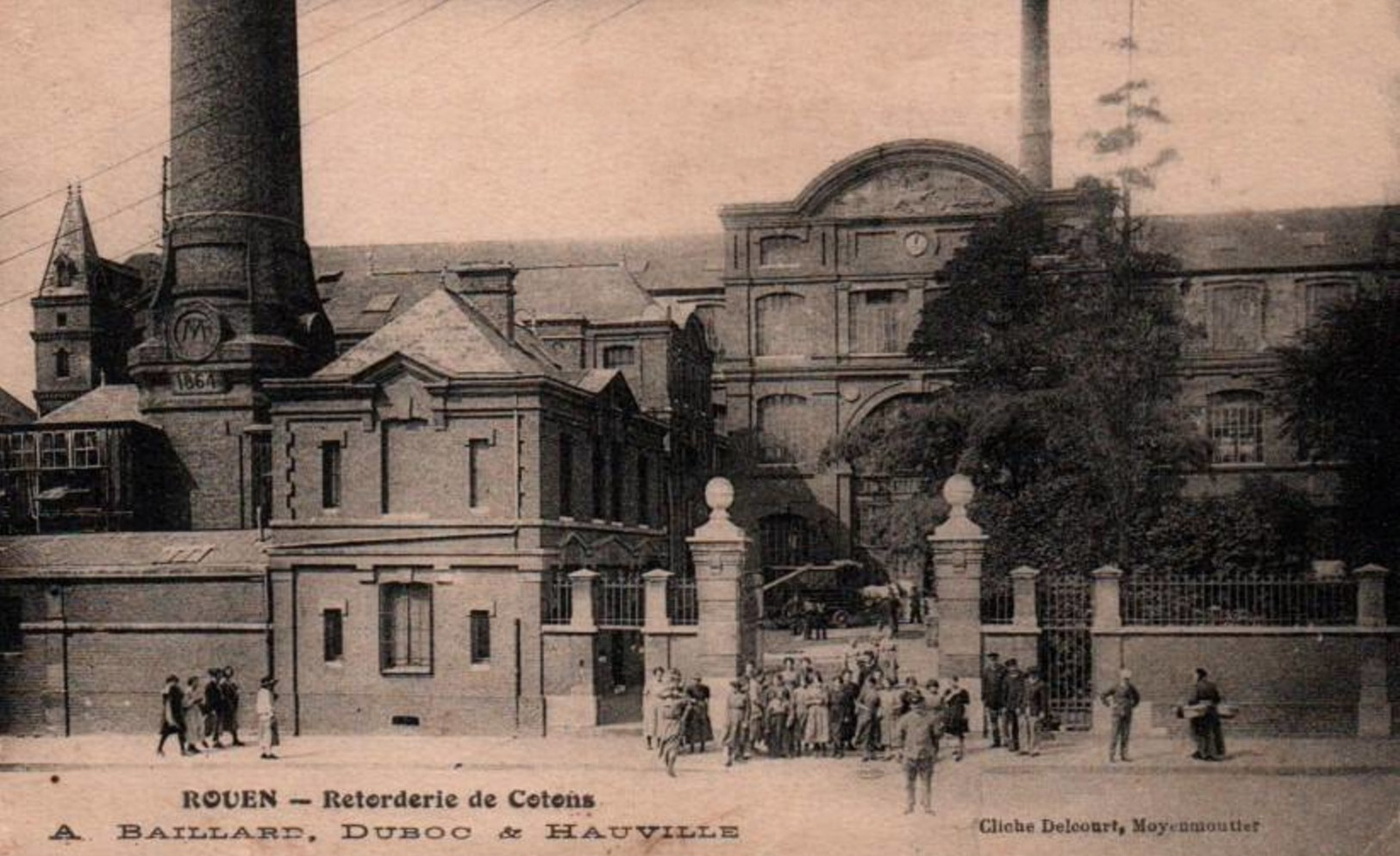
Baillard, Duboc and Hauville cotton mills.

The Industrial Revolution turned Rouen into a textile-industry town, with factories springing up, as in the Pré de la Bataille district. Founded in the 1850s, the Mottet cotton mill, which became Mottet et Bertrand and was taken over by Baillard, Duboc & Hauville, had a significant presence on the street, as shown on the map drawn up by the Société des plans monumentaux de France. Its buildings, then located at no. 7, feature one of the tallest chimneys in the western quarter. It was designed by architect Charles Fleury in 1864. The company did not survive the bombing of August 1944.

Louis Letourneur's dyeing and laundry business moved to no. 3 bis in 1878. They proved to be very important, both in terms of their activities and their size on the street. They had several branches in the department. Following the bombardment of August 1944, they were transferred to route de Lyons-la-Forêt. They did not cease trading until February 2021.

=== Associations ===
Since 1897, Rouen's Assistance par le travail association, founded in 1892, has had its headquarters here. Its aim is to provide temporary work or regular employment for the needy and unemployed, thus replacing the municipal workshops abolished in 1881. Considered a "private charity of optional assistance", it has been recognized as a public utility since 1898. In a detailed study of Rouen's social works, Yannick Marec notes that the tension between public assistance in Rouen - described as the "Rouen system" - and private charity does not prevent the two networks from complementing each other. Assistance par le travail de Rouen played an active part in this at the end of the 19th century. Now known as Le Pré de la Bataille, this non-profit organization (under the French law of 1901) is an establishment and service d'aide par le travail (ESAT) for the mentally handicapped. It also owns a late 19th-century house on this street, at no. 37.

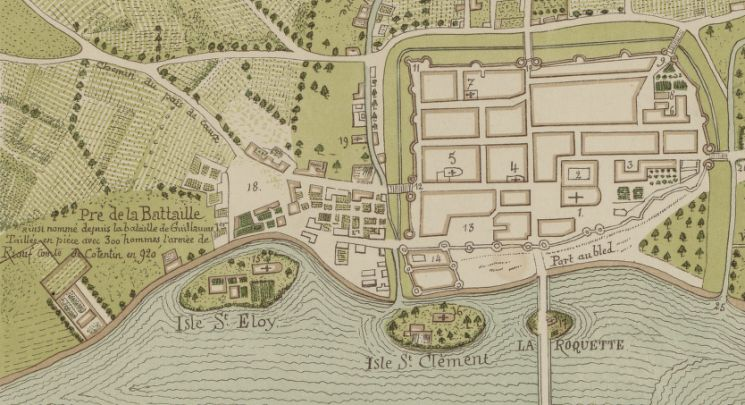

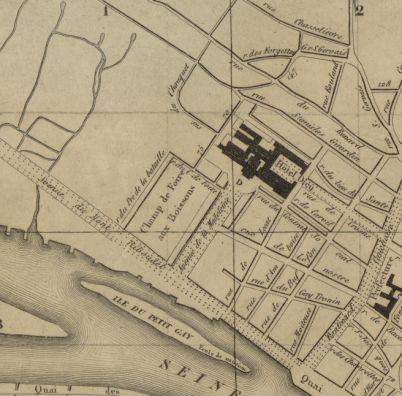

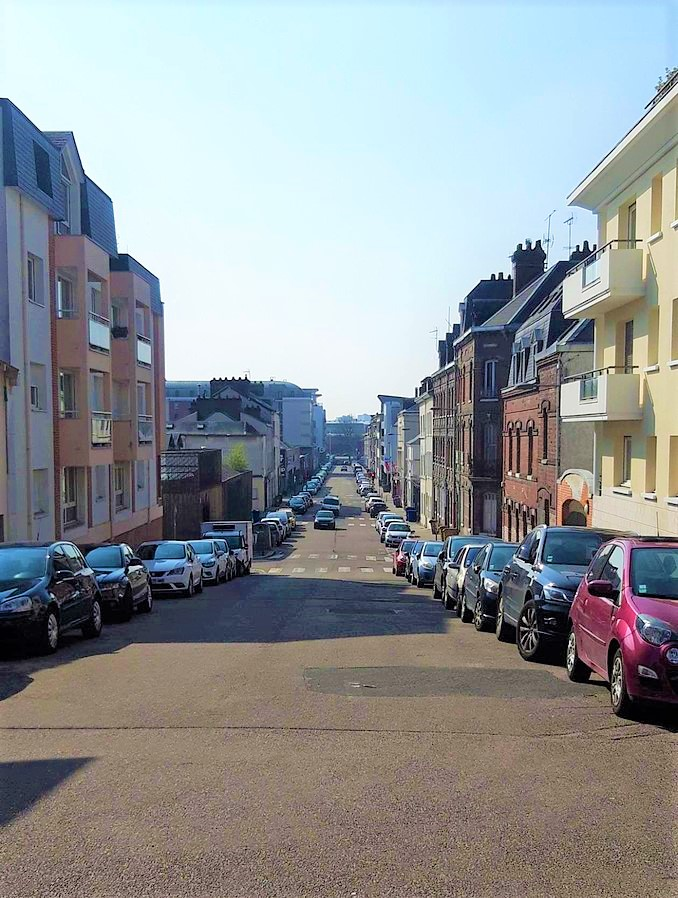

== See also ==
- Rouen

== Notes ==
1. Traduction libre aidée par (xno + fr) Wace, Frédéric Pluquet (éd. scientifique) et al., Édouard Frère, 1827.
2. The Yonville valley, found on Cassini map no. 25 called Rouen published in 1757, is a name still used at the end of the 19th century but has since fallen into disuse. This is a marshy area west of Rouen adjoining Cailly. Since that time, urbanization has channeled and covered it.

== Bibliography ==
- Périaux, Nicétas (1870). Dictionnaire indicateur et historique des rues et places de Rouen: revue de ses monuments et de ses établissements publics. A. Le Brument. p. 672.
