= Rodulf of Ivry =

Norman noble (died c. 1015)

Rodulf of Ivry (Rodolf, Ralph, Raoul, comte d'Ivry) (died c. 1015) was a Norman noble, and regent of Normandy during the minority of Richard II.

== Life ==
Rodolf was the son of Eperleng, a rich owner of several mills at Vaudreuil, and of his wife Sprota, who by William I, Duke of Normandy had been mother of Richard I of Normandy, making Rodolf the Duke's half-brother.

When Richard died in 996, Rodulf took effective power during the minority of his nephew, Richard II of Normandy, alongside the boy's mother, Gunnor.

According to William of Jumièges, Rudolf had to quell dual rebellions in 996, of peasants and nobility; against the former he cut off feet and hands. He arrested the chief aristocratic rebel Guillaume, comté d'Hiémois.

== Count ==
The counts of the duchy of Normandy were in place from around the year 1000; Rodulf is the first whose title can be attested by a document (of 1011). Pierre Bauduin following David Bates states that territorial designations for these titles came in only in the 1040s. Contemporary sources, and Dudon de Saint-Quentin, speak only of Rodulf as "count", never "of Ivry"; this is found only in later writers. Ordericus Vitalis, for example, calls him count of Bayeux. Historians now consider this erroneous, following the later Robert de Torigni, who makes Rodulf, the comte d'Ivry.

In strategic terms, Ivry was on the boundary of the duchy of Normandy, by an important crossroads on a Roman road, by the valley of the river Eure. Over some decades the Normans had struggled there against the forces of the county of Blois, after its control had reached Dreux. This position mattered for the assertion of domination of the south-east of the Évrecin. Consistently, the duchy may have conceded to the county in the direction of the county of Hiémois and towards Lieuvin (forêt du Vièvre).

Before 996, Rodulf built the castle of Ivry-la-Bataille to replace a motte-and-bailey wooden keep. It is among the earliest examples of a stone donjon or keep in the northwest of France.

== Family ==
First he married Eremburga de Canville, who died before 1011. He married a second time, to Albreda or Aubrée.

His children by Eremburga:

- Hugh, bishop of Bayeux (c. 1011–1049)
- Emma, who married Osbern the Steward and was mother of William FitzOsbern
- Raoul
- Daughter of unknown name, who married Richard de Beaufou

His child from Albreda is:

- John, bishop of Avranches (1060–1067) then archbishop of Rouen (1067–1079)
