= William of Normandy =

William of Normandy may refer to:

- William Longsword, also known as William I of Normandy (927–942)
- William the Conqueror, also known as William I of Normandy (1035–1087)
- William Clito, who claimed the duchy of Normandy in 1108–1129
