= John of Rouen =

John of Rouen may refer to

- John of Avranches, Archbishop of Rouen from 1067 to 1079
- Jean de Rouen (Joao de Ruao), a French sculptor responsible for works in the Old Cathedral of Coimbra and elsewhere
