= Osbern the Steward =

Steward of two Dukes of Normandy (died c. 1040)

Osbern the Steward, known in French as Osbern de Crépon (died about 1040), was the Steward of two dukes of Normandy and the father of William FitzOsbern, 1st Earl of Hereford, one of William the Conqueror's closest counsellors.

== Biography ==
Osbern was the son of Herfast de Crépon and the nephew of Duchess Gunnor, initially mistress and then second wife of Duke Richard I of Normandy. Under Duke Robert the Magnificent (1027–1035), he had the role of steward or seneschal. He kept this role after the duke's death in 1035. He became one of the legal protectors of the young successor to the duchy, William the Bastard, known later as William the Conqueror, then aged eight.

The young Duke William was in danger, as other members of the ducal family were trying to assassinate him to regain power in the duchy, and the Norman barons were rebelling. Osbern was murdered at Le Vaudreuil in the winter of 1040–1041, while protecting the young duke in the child's bedroom. According to Guillaume de Jumièges, his throat was cut by William, son of Roger I of Montgomery. Barnon de Glos-la-Ferrières avenged the death of his lord by killing the murderer.

Historians of the Normans disagree on the origin of the benefices held by Osbern, specifically which of them came from his father Herfast and which via his marriage to Emma, daughter of Count Rodulf of Ivry and sister of Hugues, Bishop of Bayeux. He possessed land widely spread across Normandy: in the Bessin at Crépon, at Hiémois (near Falaise), near the confluence of the rivers Seine and Andelle, around Cormeilles, in Talou, in Pays d'Ouche at Breteuil, and at La Neuve-Lyre.

== Family and descendants ==
Osbern married Emma d'Ivry, daughter of Count Rodulf of Ivry, who was half-brother of Richard I, Duke of Normandy. Their children included:

- William FitzOsbern (c. 1011–1071), 1st Earl of Hereford
- Osbern FitzOsbern (died end of 1103), Bishop of Exeter in 1072.
