= Gesta Normannorum Ducum =

Historical chronicle

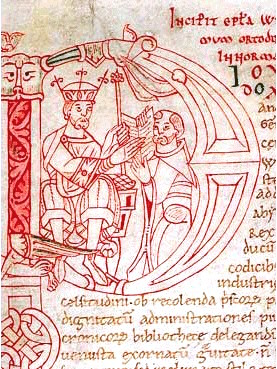
William of Jumièges offering his Gesta Normannorum Ducum to William the Conqueror

Gesta Normannorum Ducum (Deeds of the Norman Dukes) is a chronicle originally created by the monk William of Jumièges just before 1060. In 1070 William I had William of Jumièges extend the work to detail his rights to the throne of England. In later times, Orderic Vitalis (d. c. 1142) and Robert of Torigni (d. 1186), extended the volumes to include history up until Henry I.

The Gesta Normannorum Ducum by William of Jumièges has become the principal work of Norman historical writings, one of many written to glorify the Norman Conquest of England. But unlike most it was probably started in the late 1050s as a continuation of Dudo's De moribus. The monk William returned to his writing after the Conquest, most probably at the request of William the Conqueror. The final version of his history was written at his monastery at Jumièges c. 1070–1071. (Note: For a detailed analysis of the Gesta Normannorum Ducum see; Elisabeth M.C. van Houts, 'The Gesta Normannorum Ducum: a history without an end', Anglo-Norman Studies III: Proceedings of the Battle Conference 1980, Ed. R. Allen Brown (Woodbridge: The Boydell Press, 1981), pp. 106-118.) During the twelfth century there were interpolations and additions, first by Orderic Vitalis, then by Robert of Torigni, who added an entire book on Henry I of England. During the medieval period his work was widely circulated and read, was an essential work in most monasteries and was the basic source on which the histories of Wace and Benoît de Sainte-Maure were based. William's Gesta Normannorum Ducum survives today in forty-seven manuscripts.

Jules Lair undertook a modern translation, but the final work was interrupted by his death. The work was completed M. Jean Marx, a French scholar who published his translation in 1914. The original version had ended with the Harrying of the North by the Conqueror in 1070, but a passage mentioning Robert Curthose as duke appears to be a revision sometime after 1087. However, there was no evidence that William made a continuation beyond 1070. This text displays a difference from William's writing and so would seem to be of an unknown origin, but it was included by Marx in his translation, assuming it was by the original author. The most recent translations were edited and translated by Elisabeth M.C. van Houts and were published in two volumes, volume I in 1992 and volume II in 1995, both by the Clarendon Press, Oxford.

== See also ==
- Draco Normannicus
- Duchy of Normandy
- Wace's Roman de Rou

== Edition ==
- The Gesta Normannorum Ducum of William of Jumièges, Orderic Vitalis and Robert of Torigni. Edited and translated by Elisabeth M. C. Van Houts, Clarendon Press, Oxford, 1995.
