= Maud of Normandy =

French noble (daughter of Richard "the Fearless" of Normandy)

Maud
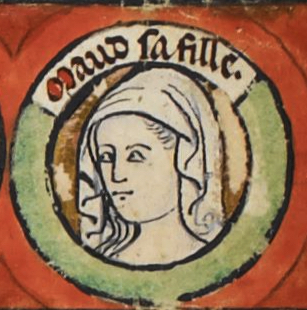
- Depiction of Maud, the family tree of dux Richard I
- Died: 1006
- Spouse: Odo II, Count of Blois
- House: Normandy
- Father: Richard the Fearless
- Mother: Gunnor

Maud of Normandy (died 1006) (French: Mathilde (Note: Maud is a vernacular form of Matilda derived from the Anglo-Norman Mehaut)) was the daughter of Richard I "the Fearless", Duke of Normandy and Gunnor. Her siblings were Richard II "the Good", Duke of Normandy; Robert, Archbishop of Rouen, Count of Evreux; Mauger, Count of Corbeil; Emma of Normandy and Hawise of Normandy.

Maud was married to Odo II, Count of Blois but died young and without issue. After her death in 1006, Odo started a quarrel with his brother-in-law, Richard II of Normandy, over the dowry: part of the town of Dreux. King Robert II, who had married Odo's mother, imposed his arbitration on the contestants circa 1011, leaving Odo in possession of Dreux. Odo went on to marry Ermengarde, daughter of William IV of Auvergne, and have issue.
