= John of Avranches =

Archbishop of Rouen

John of Avranches was bishop of Avranches from 1060 to 1067, and archbishop of Rouen from 1067 to 1079. He was a Norman churchman, son of Rodulf of Ivry, and brother of Hugh of Bayeux. He appears in the Gesta Normannorum Ducum of William of Jumièges, and may have been one of the sources William used.

He became archbishop of Rouen when his friend Lanfranc declined the position. As archbishop he was a reformer, campaigning for clerical celibacy from 1074. This led to his being stoned at a provincial synod. In 1075 he with Roger de Beaumont was in effective charge of Normandy.

He is known for his liturgical work Tractatus de officiis ecclesiasticis; it was officially adopted in the diocese of Rouen. It was written at the request of Maurilius, his predecessor as archbishop; it had only a limited impact in promoting uniformity in Normandy.
