= Pacy-sur-Eure =

Region in Normandy, France

- Commune
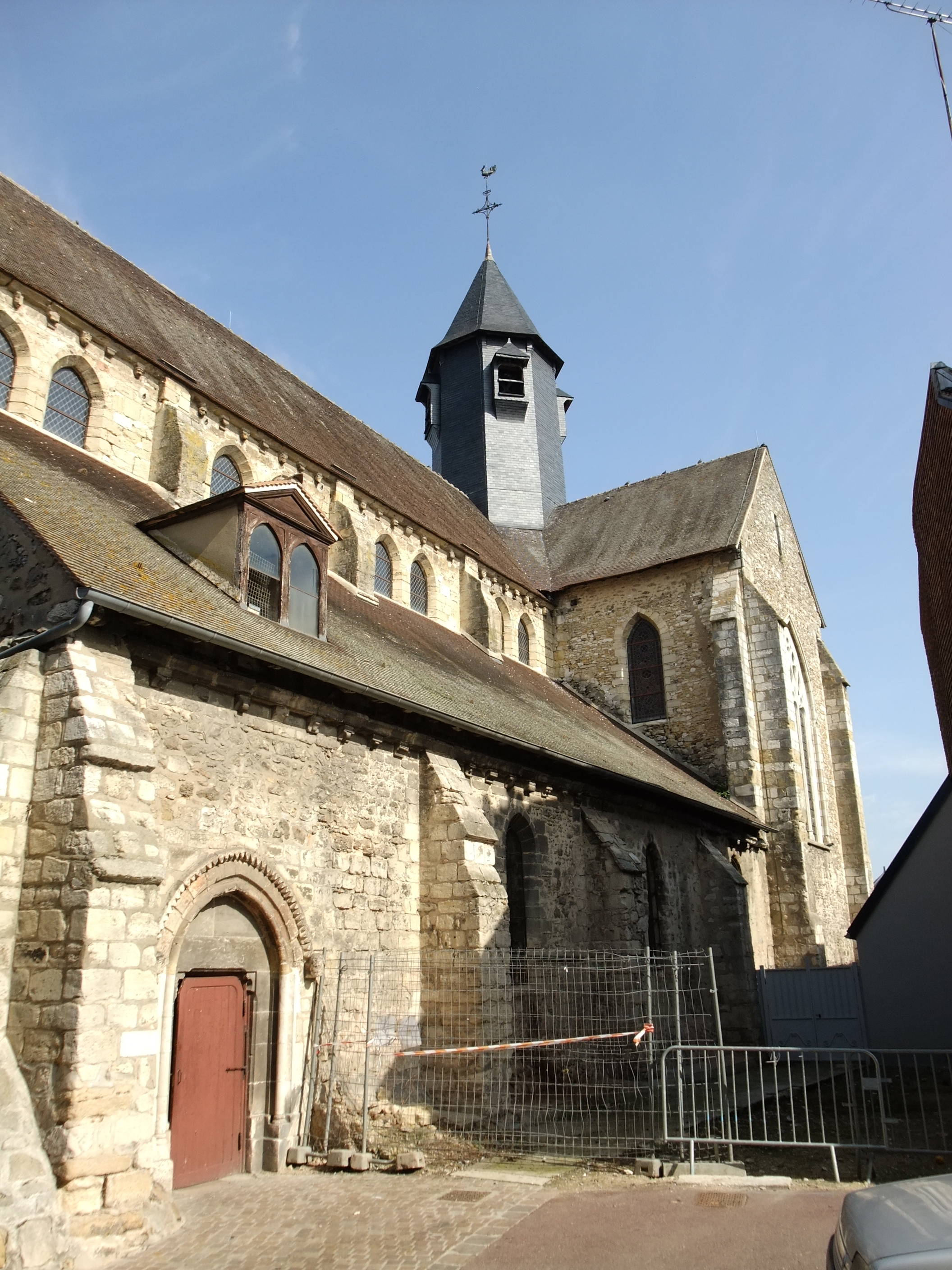
- The church in Pacy-sur-Eure

- Coat of arms
- Location of Pacy-sur-Eure
- Location within France Location within Normandy
- Coordinates: 49°01′00″N 1°22′58″E
- Country: France
- Region: Normandy
- Department: Eure
- Arrondissement: Les Andelys
- Canton: Pacy-sur-Eure
- Intercommunality: Seine Normandie Agglomération

Government
  - Mayor (2020–2026): Yves Leloutre
- Area^{1}: 22.03 km^{2} (8.51 sq mi)
- Elevation: 53 m (174 ft)
- Highest elevation: 141 m (463 ft)
- Lowest elevation: 38 m (125 ft)
- Population (2023): 5,027
  - Density: 228.2/km^{2} (591.0/sq mi)
- Time zone: UTC+01:00 (CET)
  - Summer (DST): UTC+02:00 (CEST)
- INSEE/Postal code: 27448 /27120
- ^{1} French Land Register data, which excludes lakes, ponds, glaciers > 1 km^{2} (0.386 sq mi or 247 acres) and river estuaries.

Pacy-sur-Eure (French pronunciation: [pasi syʁ œʁ]; lit. 'Pacy-on-Eure') is a commune in the Eure department, Normandy, France. On 1 January 2017, the former commune of Saint-Aquilin-de-Pacy was merged into Pacy-sur-Eure.

== Population ==
Population data refer to the commune in its geography as of January 2025.

Historical population
| Year | Pop. | ±% p.a. |
|---|---|---|
| 1968 | 3,667 | — |
| 1975 | 3,938 | +1.02% |
| 1982 | 4,094 | +0.56% |
| 1990 | 4,734 | +1.83% |
| 1999 | 5,280 | +1.22% |
| 2007 | 5,445 | +0.39% |
| 2012 | 5,129 | −1.19% |
| 2017 | 5,090 | −0.15% |
| 2023 | 5,027 | −0.21% |
Source: INSEE

== See also ==
- Communes of the Eure department
