= Harald of Bayeux =

Pagan Norse chieftain

Harald, Jarl of Bayeux or Harold was a pagan Norse chieftain who fought in support of Richard I, Duke of Normandy against Louis IV of France. He is mentioned briefly by Flodoard as "Harald, who was in those days in charge around Bayeux."

== See also ==
- Hagrold
