= Rasyphus and Ravennus =

Christian saints

Saints Rasyphus and Ravennus
- Born: Britain
- Died: 5th century Bayeux or Macé
- Venerated in: Catholic Church; Western Orthodoxy
- Feast: 23 July
- Attributes: palms of martyrdom

Saints Rasyphus (Rasiphus) and Ravennus (French: Saints Rasyphe et Raven, Ravenne) (fifth century) are venerated as Christian saints and martyrs. According to Christian tradition, they were natives of Britain who fled their country during the Anglo-Saxon invasions. They settled in Gaul and became hermits. They were then martyred, perhaps by Goths who adhered to Arianism.

The myth of foundation associated with the parish church of St-Aubin in Macé, Normandy, states that the two saints founded their hermitage near the site of the current building, near a miraculous spring of water.

There are several versions of their martyrdom. The first states that they were tossed against a great block of sandstone. Their heads dented the stone but the two saints were not hurt (there are two visible prints in the church of St-Aubin of Macé that are considered to be the marks made by the heads of the two saints). They were then decapitated and buried near the present grounds of St-Aubin de Macé; a tombstone marks the site of their former grave.

== Veneration ==
The two saints were venerated as great healers, responsible for many miracles. They were venerated in the diocese of Séez.

Their relics were taken from St-Aubin to Bayeux Cathedral during the Viking invasions. The relics were then taken to Caen during the Wars of Religion. Finally, they were taken to Grancey in Champagne, where they rest today. Their feast day is 23 July.

A medieval text called Ravennus et Rasiphus mm. Baiocis exists.
