= Ivry-la-Bataille =

- Commune
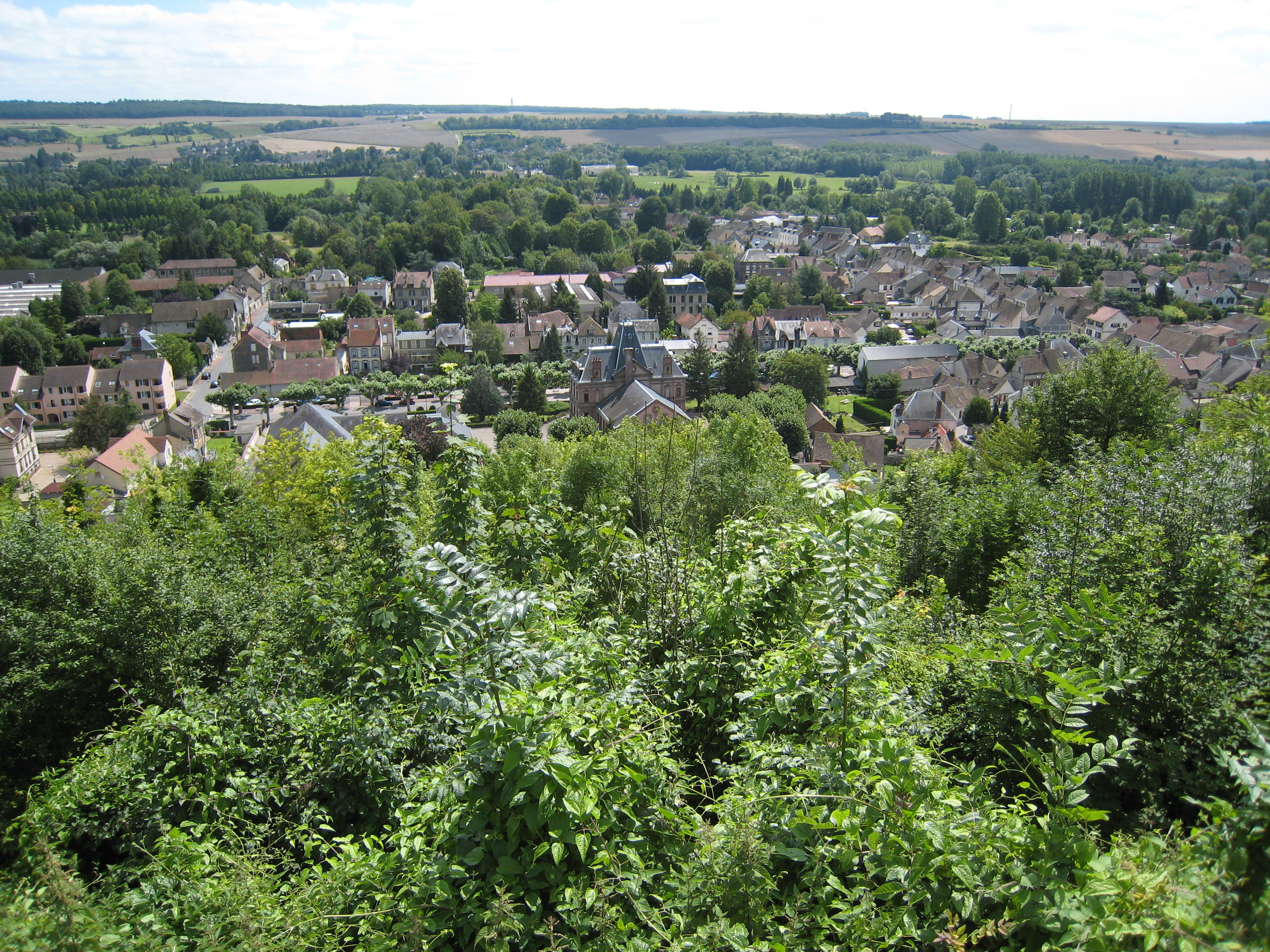
- The village seen from the chateau

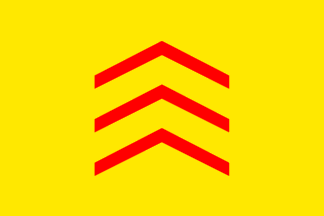
- Flag Coat of arms
- Location of Ivry-la-Bataille
- Location within France Location within Normandy
- Coordinates: 48°53′04″N 1°27′42″E
- Country: France
- Region: Normandy
- Department: Eure
- Arrondissement: Évreux
- Canton: Saint-André-de-l'Eure
- Intercommunality: CA Pays de Dreux

Government
  - Mayor (2020–2026): Sylvie Hénaux
- Area^{1}: 7.76 km^{2} (3.00 sq mi)
- Elevation: 64 m (210 ft)
- Highest elevation: 137 m (449 ft)
- Lowest elevation: 55 m (180 ft)
- Population (2023): 2,609
  - Density: 336/km^{2} (871/sq mi)
- Time zone: UTC+01:00 (CET)
  - Summer (DST): UTC+02:00 (CEST)
- INSEE/Postal code: 27355 /27540
- ^{1} French Land Register data, which excludes lakes, ponds, glaciers > 1 km^{2} (0.386 sq mi or 247 acres) and river estuaries.

Ivry-la-Bataille (French pronunciation: [ivʁi la bataj]) is a commune in the Eure Department in the Normandy region in northern France. Ivry-la-Bataille was formerly known as Ivry.

== History ==
King Henry IV of France won the Battle of Ivry near Ivry on 14 March 1590. The place was renamed Ivry-la-Bataille (Ivry-the-Battle) to commemorate the battle and to distinguish the town from Ivry-sur-Seine.

== Geography ==
Ivry-la-Bataille is located on the river Eure in Normandy and about thirty miles (48 km) west of Paris, at the boundary between the Île-de-France and the Beauce regions.

== Population ==
Historical population
Year	Pop.	±% p.a.
1968	2,183	—
1975	2,335	+0.97%
1982	2,065	−1.74%
1990	2,563	+2.74%
1999	2,639	+0.33%
2007	2,640	+0.00%
2012	2,611	−0.22%
2017	2,724	+0.85%
2023	2,609	−0.72%
Source: INSEE

== Sights ==
- Château d'Ivry-la-Bataille

== See also ==
- Communes of the Eure department
