= Château d'Ivry-la-Bataille =

Coordinates: 48.885°N 1.457°E

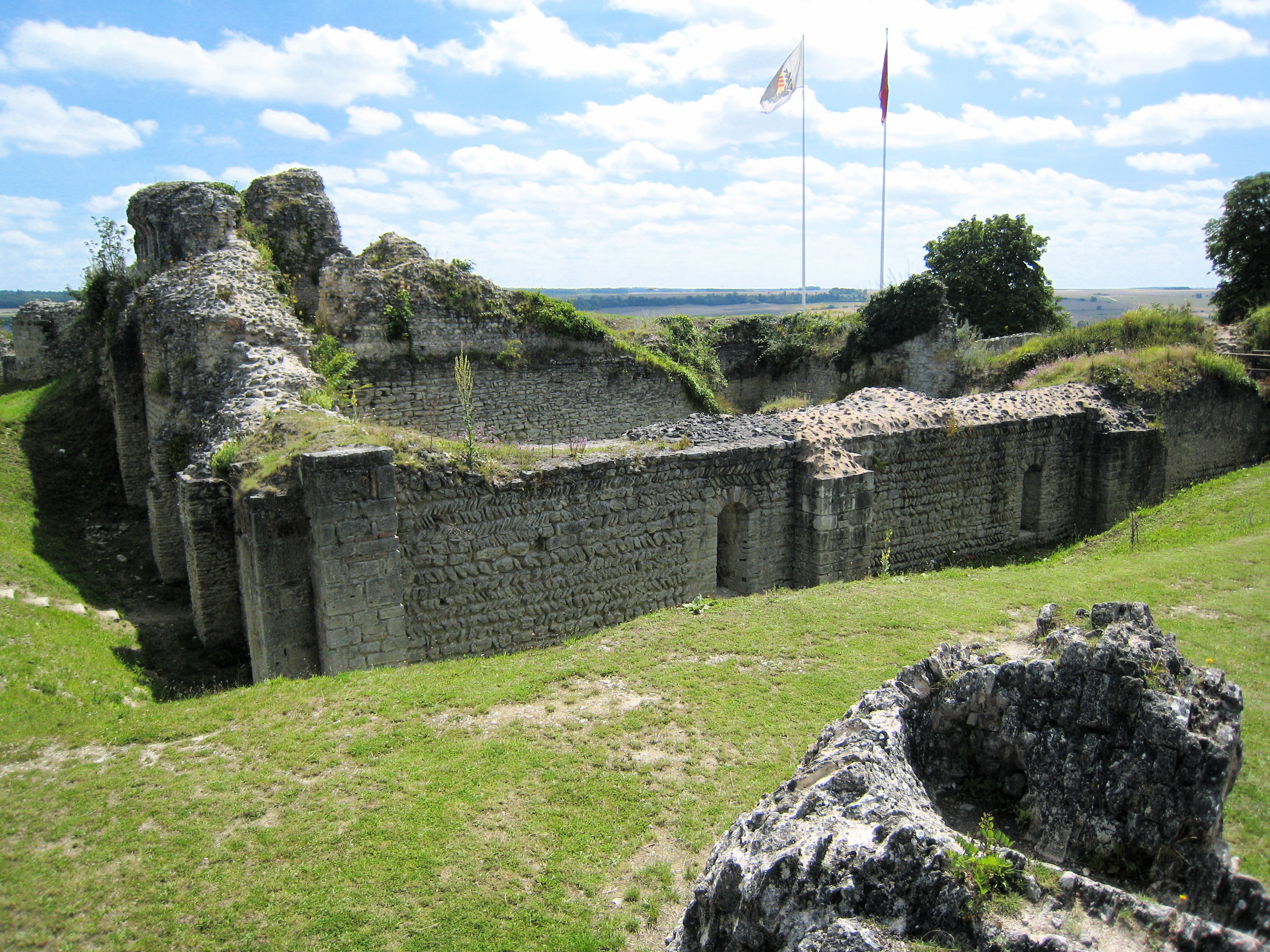
The ruins of the donjon at Château d'Ivry-la-Bataille

The Château d'Ivry-la-Bataille is a ruinous Norman castle in the town of Ivry-la-Bataille in the Normandy region. It is among the earliest examples of a stone donjon or keep, which would become a common feature of later Norman castles in various parts of Europe.

The construction of the donjon dates to around AD 1000; it was the product of two building campaigns, and appears to have been complete by 1040. According to Orderic Vitalis, it was constructed by an architect named Lanfred (or Lansfred, Lanfrai) under the orders of Count Rodulf of Ivry (French: Raoul d'Ivry). Orderic added that Rudolf's wife, Aubrey or Aubrée, is said to have had the architect beheaded, to prevent him building a similar castle for another lord.

The donjon has marked similarities with later Norman castle keeps, in Normandy notably Avranches, and in England notably Colchester Castle and the White Tower at the Tower of London. A distinctive feature that links Ivry, Colchester and the White Tower is the incorporation of an apse to house a chapel, a feature not repeated at other keeps; it has been suggested that Ivry was the model for these buildings. However, it is also possible that all three were modelled on another prototype, now lost. One possible model is the ducal castle of Rouen, which was destroyed in the thirteenth century and whose form is now unknown.

The castle was reconstructed several times up to the 15th century, with the addition of an outer wall with round towers and a gatehouse, and was repaired by Philibert de l'Orme in 1553. Only ruins now remain, overlooking the valley of the river Eure.

Until excavation in 1967-82, the form and significance of the castle were unknown, but the ruins have now been cleared and presented as a historical site. It is an official historical monument of France (MHC).
