= Saint-Aquilin-de-Pacy =

- Part of Pacy-sur-Eure
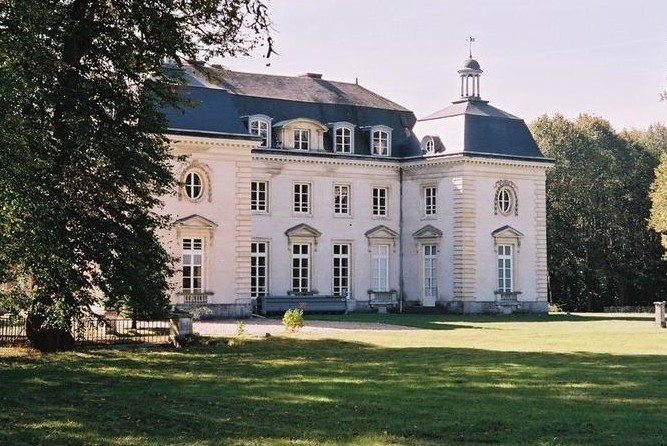
- Chateau of the Buisson de May

- Coat of arms
- Location of Saint-Aquilin-de-Pacy
- Location within France Location within Normandy
- Coordinates: 49°00′45″N 1°21′39″E
- Country: France
- Region: Normandy
- Department: Eure
- Arrondissement: Évreux
- Canton: Pacy-sur-Eure
- Commune: Pacy-sur-Eure
- Area^{1}: 8.5 km^{2} (3.3 sq mi)
- Elevation: 38 m (125 ft)
- Highest elevation: 136 m (446 ft)
- Lowest elevation: 38 m (125 ft)
- Population (2021): 498
  - Density: 59/km^{2} (150/sq mi)
- Time zone: UTC+01:00 (CET)
  - Summer (DST): UTC+02:00 (CEST)
- Postal code: 27120
- ^{1} French Land Register data, which excludes lakes, ponds, glaciers > 1 km^{2} (0.386 sq mi or 247 acres) and river estuaries.

Saint-Aquilin-de-Pacy (French pronunciation: [sɛ̃t‿akilɛ̃ də pasi], literally Saint-Aquilin of Pacy) is a former commune in the Eure department, Normandy, France. On 1 January 2017, it was merged into the commune Pacy-sur-Eure.

== Population ==
Historical population
Year	Pop.	±% p.a.
2006	556	—
2011	568	+0.43%
2021	498	−1.31%
Source: INSEE

== See also ==
- Communes of the Eure department
