= Odo II of Blois =

French nobleman (c. 985 – 1037)

Odo II
- Born: c. 985
- Died: 15 November 1037; Bar-le-Duc
- Noble family: House of Blois
- Spouses: Matilda; Ermengarde
- Issue: Theobald III, Count of Blois
- Father: Odo I of Blois
- Mother: Bertha of Burgundy

Odo II (French: Eudes) (c. 985 – 15 November 1037) was the count of Blois, Chartres, Châteaudun, Champagne, Beauvais and Tours from 1004 and count of Troyes (as Odo IV) and Meaux (as Odo I) from 1022. He twice tried to make himself a king: first in Italy after 1024 and then in Burgundy after 1032.

== Life ==
Born around 983, Odo II was the son of Odo I of Blois and Bertha of Burgundy. He was the first to unite Blois and Champagne under one authority although his career was spent in endless feudal warfare with his neighbors and suzerains, many of whose territories he tried to annex.

About 1003/1004 he married Maud, a daughter of Richard I of Normandy. After her death in 1005, and as she had no children, Richard II of Normandy demanded a return of her dowry: half the county of Dreux. Odo refused and the two warred over the matter. Finally, King Robert II, who had married Odo's mother, imposed his arbitration on the contestants in 1007, leaving Odo in possession of the castle Dreux while Richard II kept the remainder of the lands. Odo quickly married, Ermengarde, Countess of Auvergne, daughter of Robert I of Auvergne and Ermengarde of Provence.

Defeated by Fulk III of Anjou and Herbert I of Maine at the Battle of Pontlevoy in July 1016, he quickly tried to overrun the Touraine. After the death of his cousin Stephen I in 1019/1020, without heirs he seized Troyes, Meaux and all of Champagne for himself without royal approval. From there he attacked Ebles, the archbishop of Reims, and Theodoric I, Duke of Lorraine. Due to an alliance between the king and the Emperor Henry II he was forced to relinquish the county of Rheims to the archbishop.

He was offered the crown of Italy by the Lombard barons, but the offer was quickly retracted in order not to upset relations with the king of France. In 1032, he invaded the Kingdom of Burgundy on the death of Rudolph III. He retreated in the face of a coalition of the Emperor Conrad II and the new king of France, Henry I. In 1037 he took advantage of Conrad II's absence in Italy to invade the Duchy of Lorraine, but he died in the rout after being defeated by the forces of Gothelo I, Duke of Lorraine, in the Battle of Bar-le-Duc.

== Issue ==
Odo and his second wife, Ermengarde of Auvergne, had:

1. Theobald III, who inherited the county of Blois and most of his other possessions.
2. Stephen II, who inherited the counties of Meaux and Troyes in Champagne.
3. Bertha, who married first Alan III, Duke of Brittany, and second Hugh IV, Count of Maine

== Sources ==
- Bradbury, Jim (2007). The Capetians: Kings of France 987–1328. Hambledon Continuum.
- Breese, Lauren Wood (1977). "The Persistance of Scandinavian Connections in Normandy in the Tenth and Early Eleventh Centuries". Viator. 8. University of California Press: Center for Medieval and Renaissance Studies: 47–62. doi:10.1484/J.VIATOR.2.301563.
- Evergates, Theodore (2007). The Aristocracy in the County of Champagne, 1100–1300. University of Pennsylvania Press.
- Guillot, Olivier (1992). "A Reform of Investiture before the Investiture Struggle in Anjou, Normandy, and England". In Patterson, Robert (ed.). The Haskins Society Journal Studies in Medieval History. The Hambledon Press. pp. 81–100. ISBN 978-1852850319.
- Hallam, Elizabeth M; Everard, Judith (1980). Capetian France 987–1328. Routledge.
- Halphen, Louis (1964). "France in the Eleventh Century". In Gwatkin, H.M.; Whitney, J.P.; Tanner, J.R.; Previté-Orton, C.W. (eds.). Cambridge Medieval History. Vol. III. Cambridge at the University Press. pp. 99–132.
- Krause, Hans G.; Jasper, Detlev, eds. (2009). Die Touler Vita Leos IX (in German). Harrassowitz Verlag. ISBN 978-3-7752-5391-8.
- Lex, Leonce (1892). Eudes, comte de Blois (in French). Dufour-Bouquot.
- Norgate, Kate (1890). "Odo of Champagne, Count of Blois and 'Tyrant of Burgundy'". The English Historical Review. 5, No. 19, (July).
- Previté-Orton, C.W. (1912). The Early History of the House of Savoy. Cambridge University Press.
- Stasser, Thierry (1990). "Mathilde, fille du Comte Richard » Essai d'identification". Annales de Normandie (in French). 40–1: 49–64. doi:10.3406/annor.1990.1855.

Odo II of Blois House of Blois Born: 983 Died: 15 November 1037
Preceded by Theobald II	Count of Blois; 1004–1037	Succeeded by Theobald III
