= Herfast de Crépon =

Norman nobleman

Herfast de Crépon, also Arfast, (c. 978 – c. 1026) was a Norman nobleman. He was the brother of Gunnor, the Duchess of Normandy, and the grandfather of William FitzOsbern, 1st Earl of Hereford.

== Life ==
Arfast came from a powerful family in western Normandy of Danish descent. Historian David C. Douglas writes that he must have been born "little more than fifty years after Rollo's death", which occurred around 928. His sister was Gunnor, the wife of Richard I of Normandy (r. 942–996).

About 1015, Arfast witnessed a grant of Gunnor to the Abbey of Mont Saint-Michel.

Historian David C. Douglas has identified him as the same Arfast involved in a December 1022 heresy trial at the church of St. Croix, Orléans, before king Robert II of France. At the trial of several canons accused of neo-Manachaeism, Arfast testified that though uninfluenced by their heresy he pretended to share their beliefs so as to gain knowledge that could be used to denounce them. Public sentiment was so inflamed against the heresy that the king was forced to station queen Constance at the church door to prevent the crowd from immediately killing the heretics. On their conviction, the majority were taken out of the church and burned. Arfast then retired as a monk to the Abbey of Saint-Père-en-Vallée at Chartres, to which he donated land. Gunnor and her children Richard II of Normandy and Robert, archbishop of Rouen, similarly made donations to this abbey.

Arfast founded one of the greatest Norman aristocratic families. He was the father of Osbern, the steward under two of the dukes of Normandy, and another son named Ranulf. His grandchildren included William FitzOsbern, 1st Earl of Hereford, and Osbern FitzOsbern, the Bishop of Exeter.

Based on charter evidence, Arfast probably died before 1026.
