= Mauger, Count of Corbeil =

Norman noble (died 1032)

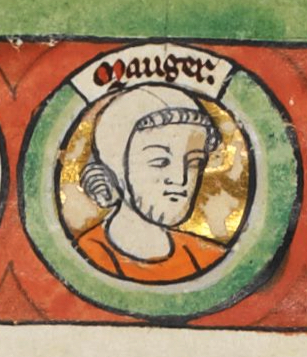

Mauger (c. 988 – 1032) jure uxoris Count of Corbeil was the third son of Richard I of Normandy, and ruled as Count of Corbeil through his wife Germaine, either a daughter or granddaughter of Aymon, Count of Corbeil. "Corbeil" is thought to be the modern Corbeil-Essonnes on the River Seine about 17 miles south-east of Paris.

== Life ==
Mauger was a son of Richard I, Duke of Normandy and his second wife, Gunnor. He was a younger brother of duke Richard II and uncle of duke Robert I. He married in the year 1012, Germaine, daughter or granddaughter of Aymon (Haymon), Count of Corbeil, and his wife Elizabeth Le Riche.

He may have been the father of William "Werlenc", Count of Mortain, though this is disputed.
