= Bertran =

Bertran or Bertrán is a given name. Notable people with the name include:

- Bertran Carbonel (1252–1265), Provençal troubadour
- Bertran d'Alamanon (1229–1266), Provençal knight, troubadour, an official, diplomat, and ambassador of the court of the Count of Provence
- Bertran de Born (1140–1215), baron from the Limousin in France, and one of the major Occitan troubadours of the twelfth century
- Bertran de Born lo Filhs (1179–1233), Limousin knight and troubadour
- Bertran de Gourdon (1209–1231), the lord of Gourdon, knight, and troubadour
- Bertran del Pojet (fl. 1222), Provençal castellan and troubadour
- Bertran Folcon d'Avignon (1202–1233), Provençal nobleman and troubadour
- Marc Bertrán Vilanova (born 1982), Spanish footballer
- Pierre Bertran de Balanda (1887–1946), French horse rider

== See also ==
- Barneville-la-Bertran, commune in the Calvados department in the Basse-Normandie region in north-western France
