= William Longsword =

Count of Normandy from 927 to 942

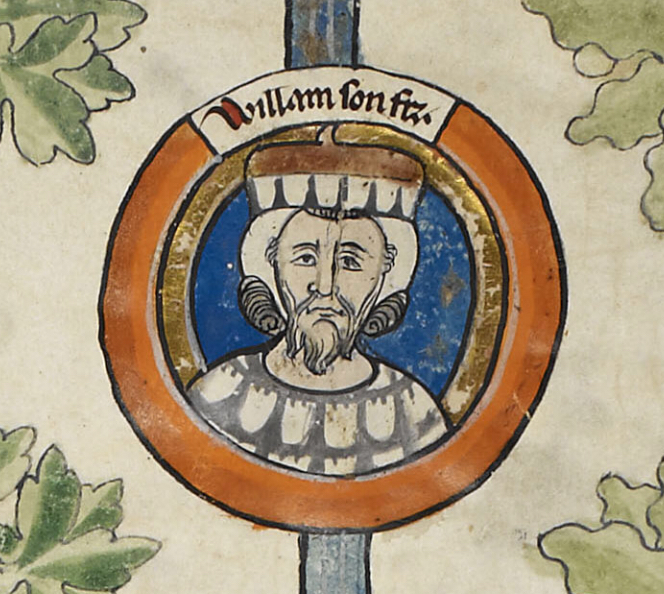

Count of Rouen
- Reign: 927–942
- Predecessor: Rollo
- Successor: Richard I
- Born: c. 893 possibly England
- Died: 17 December 942 (aged 48–49); Picquigny on the Somme
- Burial: Rouen Cathedral
- Spouses: Luitgarde of Vermandois; Sprota
- Issue: Richard I of Normandy
- House: Normandy
- Father: Rollo, Count of Rouen
- Mother: Poppa of Bayeux

William Longsword (French: Guillaume Longue-Épée, Old Norman: Williame de lon Espee, Latin: Willelmus Longus Ensis, Old Norse: Vilhjálmr Langaspjót; c. 893 – 17 December 942) was the second ruler of Normandy, from 927 until his assassination in 942.

== Titles ==
He is sometimes referred to as a "duke of Normandy", though the title duke (dux) did not come into common usage until the 11th century. Longsword was known at the time as count (Latin comes) of Rouen. Flodoard—always detailed about titles—consistently referred to both Rollo and his son William as principes (chieftains) of the Normans. There are no contemporary accounts of William's byname, 'Longsword', either; it appears first in later eleventh-century sources.

== Birth ==
William Longsword was born "overseas" (Note: Neveux and other authorities believe this may have been in England, as Rollo left Neustria for several years, probably for England. See: Neveux, p. 62; Complainte sur l'assassinat de Guillaume Longue-Ėpée, duc de Normandie, poème inédit du Xe siècle, Gaston Paris; Jules Lair, Bibliothèque de l'école des chartes (1870), Volume 31, Issue 31, p. 397; Complainte de la mort de Guillaume Longue Ėpėe; and Prentout, Etude critique sur Dudon de Saint-Quentin, 178–179 [ns].) to the Viking Rollo (while he was still a pagan) and his wife more danico (a kind of non-Christian marriage), Poppa of Bayeux. Poppa's parentage is uncertain. Dudo of Saint-Quentin in his panegyric of the Norman dukes describes her as the daughter of a Count Berengar, the dominant prince of that region. In the 11th-century Annales Rotomagenses (Annals of Rouen), she is called the daughter of Guy, Count of Senlis, otherwise unknown to history. (Note: See Commentary: The origin of Poppa at: Stewart Baldwin, The Henry Project: "Poppa" for more detailed discussion and opinions.) However she was a Christian and seems to have passed on her religious beliefs to her son. According to the Longsword's planctus, William was baptized a Christian probably at the same time as his father, which Orderic Vitalis stated was in 912, by Franco, Archbishop of Rouen.

== Life ==
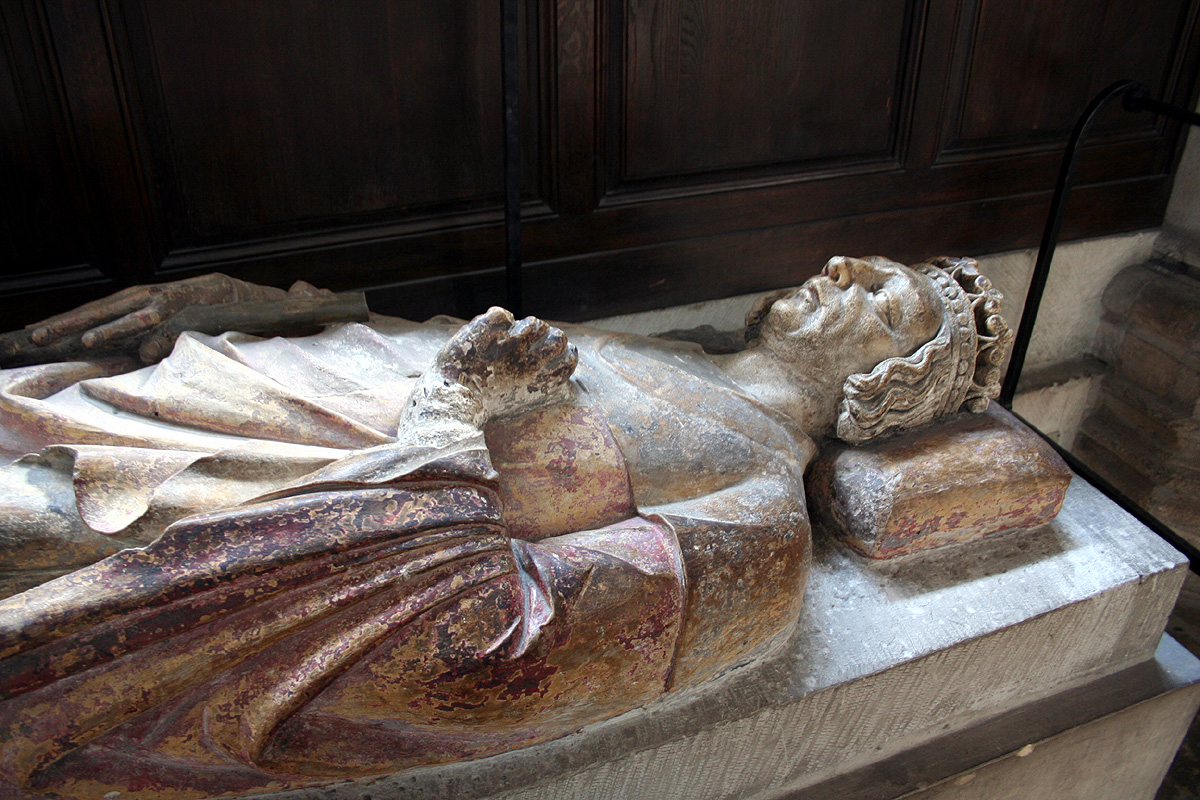
The funerary monument of William Longsword in the cathedral of Rouen, France. The monument is from the 14th century.

William succeeded Rollo (who continued to live about five more years) in 927 and, early in his reign, in 933 or 934, faced a rebellion from Normans who felt he had become too Gallicised. According to Dudo of Saint-Quentin, the leader of the rebellion was Riulf, who besieged William in Rouen. Sallying forth, William won a decisive battle, proving his authority to be duke. At the time of this rebellion, William sent his pregnant more danico wife, Sprota, to Fécamp where their son Richard was born.

In 933, William recognized King Rudolph, who was struggling to assert his authority in Northern France, as King of Western Francia. In turn, Rudolph gave him lordship over much of the lands of the Bretons including Avranches, the Cotentin Peninsula and the Channel Islands, although in practice these were lands that were outside Carolingian power. The Bretons resisted these changes, led by Alan II, Duke of Brittany, and Count Berengar of Rennes, but this ended shortly with great slaughter and Breton castles being razed to the ground; Alan fled to England and Berengar sought reconciliation.

In 935, William married Luitgarde, daughter of Count Herbert II of Vermandois, whose dowry gave him the lands of Longueville, Coudres and Illiers-l'Évêque. He also contracted a marriage between his sister Adela (whose Norse name was Gerloc) and William, Count of Poitou, with the approval of France's most powerful magnate, Hugh the Great. In addition to supporting King Rudolph, William was now a loyal ally of his father-in-law, Herbert II, both of whom his father had opposed. In January 936, Rudolph died and the 16-year-old Louis IV, who was living in exile in England, was persuaded by a promise of loyalty by William to return and became king. The Bretons returned from exile seeking to recover the lands taken by the Normans, resulting in fighting in the expanded Norman lands.

The new king was not capable of controlling his Barons and, after William's brother-in-law, Herluin II, Count of Montreuil, was attacked by Flanders, William went to their assistance in 939, whereupon Arnulf I, Count of Flanders retaliated by attacking Normandy. Arnulf captured the castle of Montreuil-sur-Mer, expelling Herluin, after which Herluin and William cooperated to retake the castle. William was excommunicated for his actions in destroying several estates belonging to Arnulf. William pledged his loyalty to King Louis IV when they met in 940 and, in return, he was confirmed in lands that had been given to his father.

William started the Norman monastic revival with both a posthumous reputation among monastic chroniclers and evidence from the religious charters of abbeys in Jumièges, Saint-Ouen and Mont-Saint-Michel. He took a particular interest in Jumièges Abbey, where he invited back the community which had fled Normandy from the Vikings in 841 as well as requesting monks from Aquitaine to help rebuild the monastery. The abbey was rebuilt on a grander scale and there was a tradition in Jumièges that William wanted to be a monk there himself.

== Assassination ==
In 941, a peace treaty, brokered in Rouen by King Louis IV, was signed between the Bretons and Normans, which limited Norman expansion into Breton lands. The following year, on 17 December 942 at Picquigny on an island on the Somme, William was ambushed and killed by followers of Arnulf while at a peace conference to settle their differences.

== Family ==
William had no children with his Christian wife, Luitgarde. He fathered a son, Richard, with Sprota, (Note: Sprota married Esperling, a rich miller in the Pont-de-l'Arche-Louviers region. By her, he had a son, Count Rodulf of Ivry, who was one of the most trusted advisers of his half-brother, Richard I of Normandy. See Searle, p. 108 and The Normans in Europe, p. 57) his wife more danico. Richard, then aged 10, succeeded as ruler of Normandy upon William's death in December, 942.

== Sources ==
- Brown, R. Allen (1994), The Normans and the Norman Conquest, Boydell & Brewer
- Crouch, David (2002). The Normans: The History of a Dynasty. London: Hambledon Continuum.
- Douglas, David C. (May 1964). William the Conqueror: The Norman Impact Upon England.
- Douglas, David C. (1977a). Time and the hour : some collected papers of David C. Douglas. London: Eyre Methuen Collection.
- Neveux, François (2008). A Brief History of the Normans. Constable & Robinson. ISBN 9780762433711.
- Potts, Cassandra (2007). "Normandy 911-1114". In Harper-Bill, Christopher; Van Houts, Elisabeth (eds.). A Companion to the Anglo-Norman World. Woodbridge, UK: The Boydell Press.

French nobility
Preceded by Rollo	Count of Rouen c. 927–942	Succeeded by Richard I
