= Richard I of Normandy =

Duke of Normandy from 942 to 996

Richard I
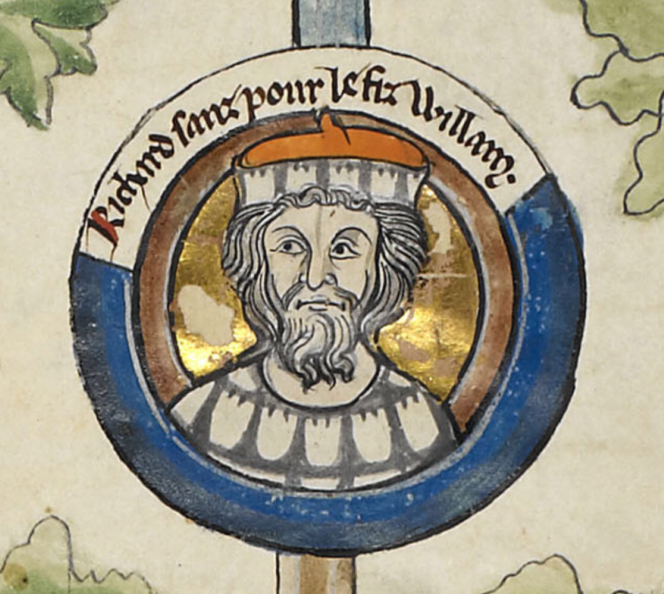

Count of Rouen
- Reign: 17 December 942 – 20 November 996
- Predecessor: William Longsword
- Successor: Richard II
- Born: 28 August 932; Fécamp, Duchy of Normandy
- Died: 20 November 996 (aged 64); Fécamp, Duchy of Normandy
- Spouses: Emma of Paris; Gunnor
- Issue more...: Richard II of Normandy; Robert II (Archbishop of Rouen); Mauger, Count of Corbeil; Emma of Normandy; Maud of Normandy; Hawise of Normandy; Geoffrey, Count of Eu; William I, Count of Eu
- House: Normandy
- Father: William Longsword
- Mother: Sprota

Richard I (28 August 932 – 20 November 996), also known as Richard the Fearless (French: Richard Sans-Peur; Old Norse: Jarl Rikard), was the count of Rouen from 942 to 996. Dudo of Saint-Quentin, whom Richard commissioned to write the "De moribus et actis primorum Normanniae ducum" (Latin, "On the Customs and Deeds of the First Dukes of Normandy"), called him a dux. However, this use of the word may have been in the context of Richard's renowned leadership in war, and not as a reference to a title of nobility. Richard either introduced feudalism into Normandy or he greatly expanded it. By the end of his reign, the most important Norman landholders held their lands in feudal tenure.

== Birth ==
Richard was born to William Longsword, princeps (chieftain or ruler) of Normandy, and Sprota, a Breton mistress bound to William by a more danico marriage. He was also the grandson of the famous Rollo. William was told of the birth of a son after the battle with Riouf and other Viking rebels, but his existence was kept secret until a few years later when William Longsword first met his son Richard. After kissing the boy and declaring him his heir, William sent Richard to be raised in Bayeux. Richard was about ten years old when his father was killed on 17 December 942. After William was killed, Sprota became the wife of Esperleng, a wealthy miller. Rodulf of Ivry was their son and Richard's half-brother.

== Life ==
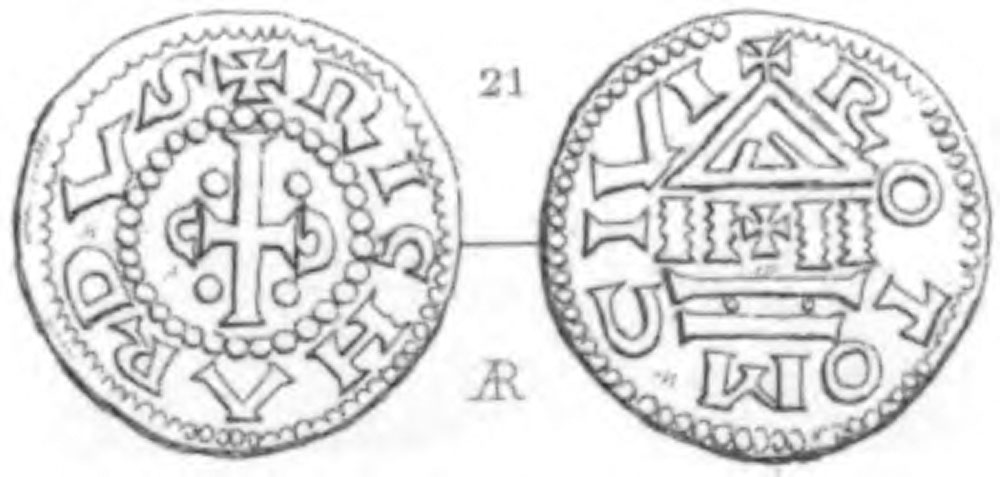
Coin of Richard I

With the death of Richard's father in 942, King Louis IV of West Francia installed the ten year old Richard as Duke of Normandy. An attempt to revive paganism was made a year after his father's death when the Scandinavian Setric and his followers landed in Normandy and induced a number of Christian Viking settlers to apostatize; among them, one Turmod who sought to make a pagan of the young duke.

The invasion was defeated by Louis IV and Hugh the Great and under the influence of Count Arnulf I of Flanders, the king took him into Frankish territory to place him in the custody of the count of Ponthieu. However, the king reneged and seized the lands of the Duchy of Normandy. He then split up the duchy, giving its lands in lower Normandy to Hugh the Great. Louis IV thereafter kept Richard in close confinement at Lâon.

Upon hearing that Richard was being held in captivity, the boy's foster Osmond de Centville and Bernard the Dane formed a mob of knights and peasants across town and marched to the King's palace. They threatened the king to force him to return Richard. Louis protested that he had kept Richard in his domain to train him in courtliness. He subsequently appeased the mob by holding Richard up in his arms for the crowd to see and returning him. Bernard de Senlis and Ivo de Bellèsme also assisted in Richard's release, along with pagan Norse forces led by Harald of Bayeux.

In 946, at the age of 14, Richard allied himself with the Norman and Viking leaders in France and with men sent by Harald Bluetooth. A battle was fought after which Louis IV was captured. Hostages were taken and held until King Louis signed the treaty of Gerberoy recognising Richard as duke and returning Normandy to him. Richard agreed to "commend" himself to Hugh, the count of Paris; Hugh resolved to form a permanent alliance with Richard and promised his daughter Emma, who was little more than a girl, as a bride; the marriage would take place in 960. According to Dudo of Saint-Quentin Richard became a sort of King of Normandy.

Louis, working with Arnulf, persuaded Emperor Otto I to attack Richard and Hugh. The combined armies of Otto, Arnulf, and Louis were driven from the gates of Rouen, fleeing to Amiens and being decisively defeated in 947. A period of peace ensued, Louis dying in 954, 13 year old Lothair becoming king. The middle-aged Hugh appointed Richard as guardian of his 15-year-old son, Hugh Capet in 955.

In 962, Count Theobald I of Blois attempted a renewed invasion of Rouen, Richard's stronghold, bringing a return of the Danes under Harold Bluetooth with Theobald seeing his troops were summarily routed by Normans under Richard's command, and forced to retreat before ever having crossed the Seine river. Lothair, the king of the West Franks, was fearful that Richard's retaliation could destabilize a large part of West Francia so he stepped in to prevent any further war between the two. In 987, Hugh Capet became King of the Franks.

For the last 30 years of his reign, Richard concentrated on Normandy itself, and participated less in Frankish politics and its petty wars. In lieu of building up the Norman Empire by expansion, he stabilized the realm and reunited the Normans, forging the reclaimed Duchy of his father and grandfather into West Francia's most cohesive and formidable principality.

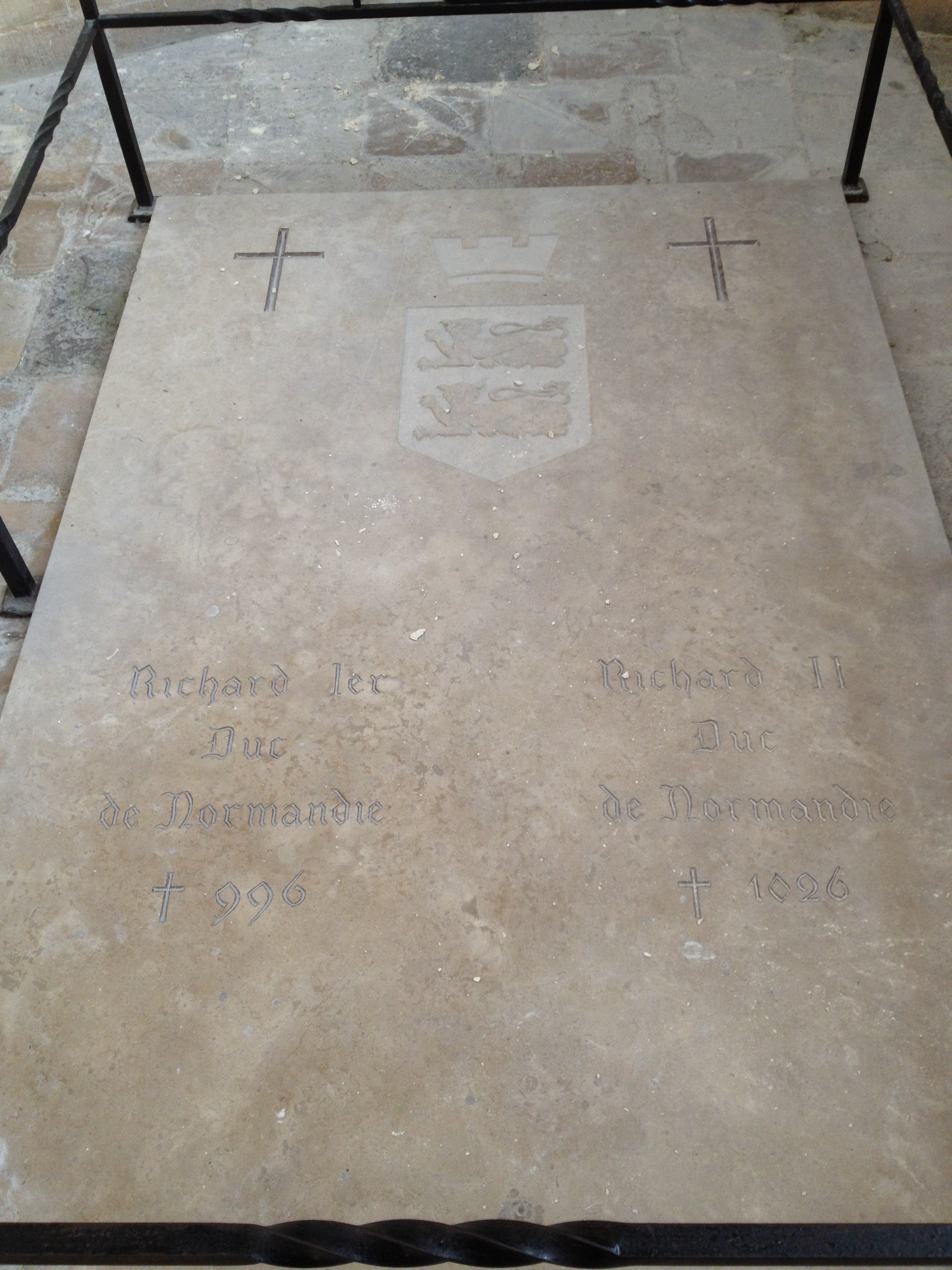
Richard's supposed tomb at Fécamp Abbey, but which was discovered in 2016 to not contain his remains

Richard died of natural causes in Fécamp on 20 November 996. He was buried at Fécamp Abbey, which he had founded. However, in 2016, what was believed to be his tomb was opened by Norwegian researchers who discovered that the interred remains could not have been those of Richard, as testing revealed that they were much older. Although it is not in doubt that Richard was buried in the Abbey in 996, it is known that his remains were moved within the Abbey several times after his burial.

=== Relationships with France, England and the Church ===
Richard used marriage to build strong alliances. His marriage to Emma of Paris connected him directly to the House of Capet. His second wife, Gunnor, from a rival Viking group in the Cotentin, formed an alliance to that group, while her sisters formed the core group that were to provide loyal followers to him and his successors.

His daughters forged valuable marriage alliances with powerful neighboring counts as well as to the king of England. Emma married firstly Æthelred the Unready and after his death in 1016, the invader, Cnut the Great. Her children included Edward the Confessor, Alfred Aetheling and with Cnut, Harthacnut, so completing a major link between the Duke of Normandy and the Crown of England that would add validity to the claim by William the Conqueror to the throne of England.

Richard also built on his relationship with the church, undertaking acts of piety, restoring their lands and refounding or enlarging a number of churches and abbeys including St. Ouen and an early version of the cathedral in Rouen, Mont-Saint-Michel, and Fécamp Abbey. However progress was slow and from a low base and by the end of his reign in 996 only four monasteries had been founded. His further reign was marked by an extended period of peace and tranquility.

== Marriages and issue ==
Family tree

Richard and his children, from a 13th-century genealogical tree

Richard's first marriage in 960 was to Emma, daughter of Hugh the Great and Hedwige of Saxony. Richard and Emma were betrothed when both were very young. She died after 19 March 968, with no issue.

According to Robert of Torigni, not long after Emma's death, Duke Richard went out hunting and stopped at the house of a local forester. He became enamored with the forester's wife, Seinfreda, but she was a virtuous woman and suggested he court her unmarried sister, Gunnor, instead. Gunnor became his mistress and her family rose to prominence. Her brother, Herfast de Crépon, may have been involved in a controversial heresy trial. Gunnor was, like Richard, of Viking descent, being part Danish by blood. Richard finally married her to legitimize their children: (Note: See the article by Todd A. Farmerie: Robert de Torigny and the family of Gunnora, Duchess of Normandy.)

- Richard II "the Good", Duke of Normandy
- Robert, Archbishop of Rouen, Count of Evreux
- Mauger, Count of Corbeil
- another son
- Emma of Normandy, wife of two kings of England, mother of two kings of England, and step-mother of another two kings of England
- Maud of Normandy, wife of Odo II of Blois, Count of Blois, Champagne and Chartres
- Hawise of Normandy, wife of Geoffrey I, Duke of Brittany

=== Children outside marriage ===
Richard was known to have had several other mistresses and had children with many of them. Known children are:

- Geoffrey, Count of Eu
- William, Count of Eu (c. 972 – 26 January 1057 or 58), m. Lasceline de Turqueville (d. 26 January 1057 or 1058).
- Beatrice of Normandy, Abbess of Montivilliers d. 1034, m. Ebles of Turenne (d.1030 (divorced)

=== Possible children ===
- Guimara (Wimarc(a)) (b. ca. 986), died Montivilliers Abbey, Seine-Inferieure, Normandy, wife of Ansfred (Ansfroi) II "le Dane" le Goz, vicomte of Exmes and Falaise, mother of Robert FitzWimarc
- Papia

House of Normandy Family tree

Count of Rouen, 911
Rollo d. between 928 and 933; 1st Norman count of Rouen r. 911–927; House of Normandy
William "Longsword" c. 893–942; 2nd Norman count of Rouen r. 927–942
Duke of Normandy, 942
Richard I "the Fearless"; 932–996; 1st Duke of Normandy r. 942–996
Richard II "the Good" d. 1026; 2nd Duke of Normandy r. 996–1027	Robert; Count of Évreux, Archbishop of Rouen	Mauger c. 988–1032 m. Germain, Countess of Corbeil	Geoffrey d. c. 1010; Count of Eu	William I 978–after 1057; Count of Eu and Hiémois
House of Clare
Richard III; 997/1001–1027; 3rd Duke of Normandy r. 1026–1027	Robert I "the Magnificent"; 1000–1035; 4th Duke of Normandy r. 1027–1035	Richard c. 1015–1067; Count of Évreux	Ralph de Gacé d. 1051; Lord of Gacé
Illegitimate
Nicolas of Normandy c. 1027–1092; Abbot of Saint Ouen	William II (of Normandy) "the Conqueror" c. 1028–1087; 5th Duke of Normandy r. 1035–1087, King of England as "William I" r. 1066–1087	William c. 1015–1067; Count of Évreux
Robert II "Curthose" c. 1051–1134; 6th Duke of Normandy r. 1087–1106	Richard c. 1054–1070	Adela c. 1067–1137 m. Stephen II, Count of Blois	William II (of England) "Rufus" c. 1057–1100; King of England r. 1087–1100; Ducal Regent r. 1096–1100	Henry I "Beauclerc" c. 1068–1135; King of England r. 1100–1135, 7th Duke of Normandy r. 1106–1135
Illegitimate→
William Clito; 1102–1128; Count of Flanders; Ducal claimant	Stephen; 1092/1096–1154; King of England r. 1135–1154, 8th Duke of Normandy r. 1135–1144	Henry V 1081/1086–1125; King of Germany, Holy Roman Emperor	Matilda I c. 1102–1167; Lady of the English "Empress Matilda"	Geoffrey Plantagenet; 1113–1151; Count of Anjou, 9th Duke of Normandy r. 1144–1150	William III Adelin; 1103–1120; Duke of Normandy 1120 in his father's lifetime	Robert I c. 1090–1147; 1st Earl of Gloucester	Richard of Lincoln before 1101–1120	Reginald c. 1100–1175; 1st Earl of Cornwall	Robert FitzEdith; 1093–1172 m. Matilda d'Avranches, Baroness of Okehampton	Gilbert FitzRoy	Henry FitzRoy c. 1100/1104–1158	Fulk FitzRoy c. 1092–1132; Monk at Abingdon?
House of Blois	House of Salians	House of Plantagenet
Illegitimate→
Henry II "Curtmantle"; 1133–1189; 10th Duke of Normandy r. 1150–1189; King of England r. 1154–1189	William FitzRobert; 1116–1183; 2nd Earl of Gloucester	Roger of Worcester c. 1134–1179; Bishop of Worcester	Richard d. 1142; Bishop of Bayeux	Meiler Fitzhenry d. 1220; Lord Chief Justice of Ireland
Henry "the Young King"; 1155–1183; Duke of Normandy r. 1170–1183 in his father's lifetime	Richard IV "Lionheart"; 1157–1199; 11th Duke of Normandy, King of England as "Richard I" r. 1189–1199	John "Lackland"; 1166–1216; 12th Duke of Normandy, King of England r. 1199–1216
Henry III; 1207–1272; 13th Duke of Normandy r. 1216–1259; King of England r. 1216–1272
Duchy of Normandy renounced at Treaty of Paris, 1259

== Notes ==
French nobility
Preceded by William I	Count of Rouen; 942–996	Succeeded by Richard II
