= Jules Lair =

French lawyer, businessman and scholar (1836–1907)

Jules–Auguste Lair
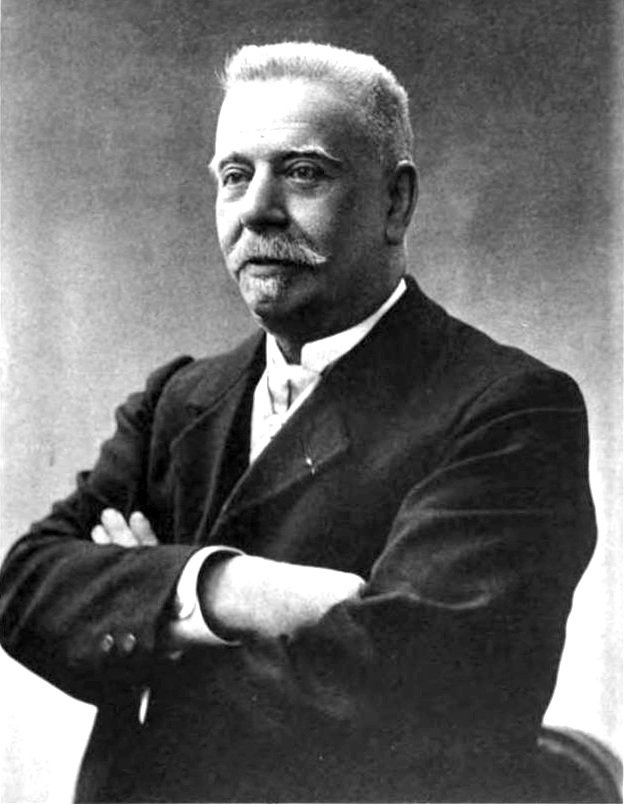
- Born: 25 May 1836; Caen, France
- Died: 16 May 1907 (aged 70); Paris, France
- Occupations: Lawyer, paleographer, historian, antiquary, businessman

Jules–Auguste Lair (25 May 1836 – 16 May 1907) was a French lawyer, businessman and scholar. At the École des Chartes he studied palaeography, and was offered a position with the National Archives, but he decided instead to become a lawyer. At the age of 25 he became director of a warehousing company, and over the next forty years was involved in various major enterprises including the first telephone network in France. At the same time, he always set aside time for historical work, and published many articles and books on aspects of French history from the Middle Ages to the French Revolution.

== Life ==
=== Early years ===
Jules-Auguste Lair was born in Caen on 25 May 1836. His family was prosperous. His father, a trader in butter, died while he was a child. He studied at the Collège Royal de Caen, (Note: Collège Royal de Caen: now the Lycée Malherbe) where he was a brilliant pupil. He then moved to Paris where he attended the École des Chartes and studied archival palaeography. (Note: Archival palaeography: This involves deciphering old scripts held in the archives, transferring them into modern writing systems, dating the texts, identifying where they were written, cataloguing and annotating them.) He entered the École des Chartes in the autumn of 1855, and graduated first in 1858, ahead of Siméon Luce.

Lair was offered a position with the Archives, but chose to follow a career as a lawyer. He earned a doctorate from the Faculty of Law in Paris in 1859. He enrolled at the Bar of Paris, where he pleaded some cases. During the 1860–61 judicial year he was one of the secretaries of the Conférence des avocats du barreau de Paris. He entered the office of Sébastien Joseph Boulatignier^{(fr)}, President of the litigation section in the Council of State. He also worked for Antoine Blanche, Advocate General at the Court of Cassation.

=== Businessman ===
In 1860, at the age of 25 Lair accepted the job of deputy director of the new Compagnie des Entrepôts et Magasins généraux de Paris (Paris Warehouse and General Stores Company) under M. Moranvillé, a friend of Boulatignier. The company was formed from assets of the failed Docks Napoléon. (Note: The Docks Napoleon had been founded at the start of the Second French Empire to manage large warehouses where goods shipped to Parisian tradesmen or industrialists by canal or railway could be stored until needed. The concept was good, but bad management, and perhaps dishonesty, caused the company to fail.) Lair was in charge of litigation. By 1870 the company was well organized, financially secure and doing more business than had been foreseen for the original Docks Napoléon.

The Franco-Prussian War broke out in 1870. Lair became a captain in the staff of General Trochu in the National Guard. He was awarded the Cross of the Legion of Honour by decree of 30 January 1871. During the Paris Commune in 1871 the warehouses in the Villette and Pont de Flandre^{(fr)} quarters were occupied by the most fervent partisans of the Commune, and burned down. After the disaster Moranvillé and Lair managed to raise funds to rebuild, which they achieved within two years. In 1873 Moranvillé retired and Lair became director of the company. He would hold this position for 33 years. In 1873 he married a Mlle Dehaussy, from a family that was always interested in intellectual pursuits and particularly the arts.

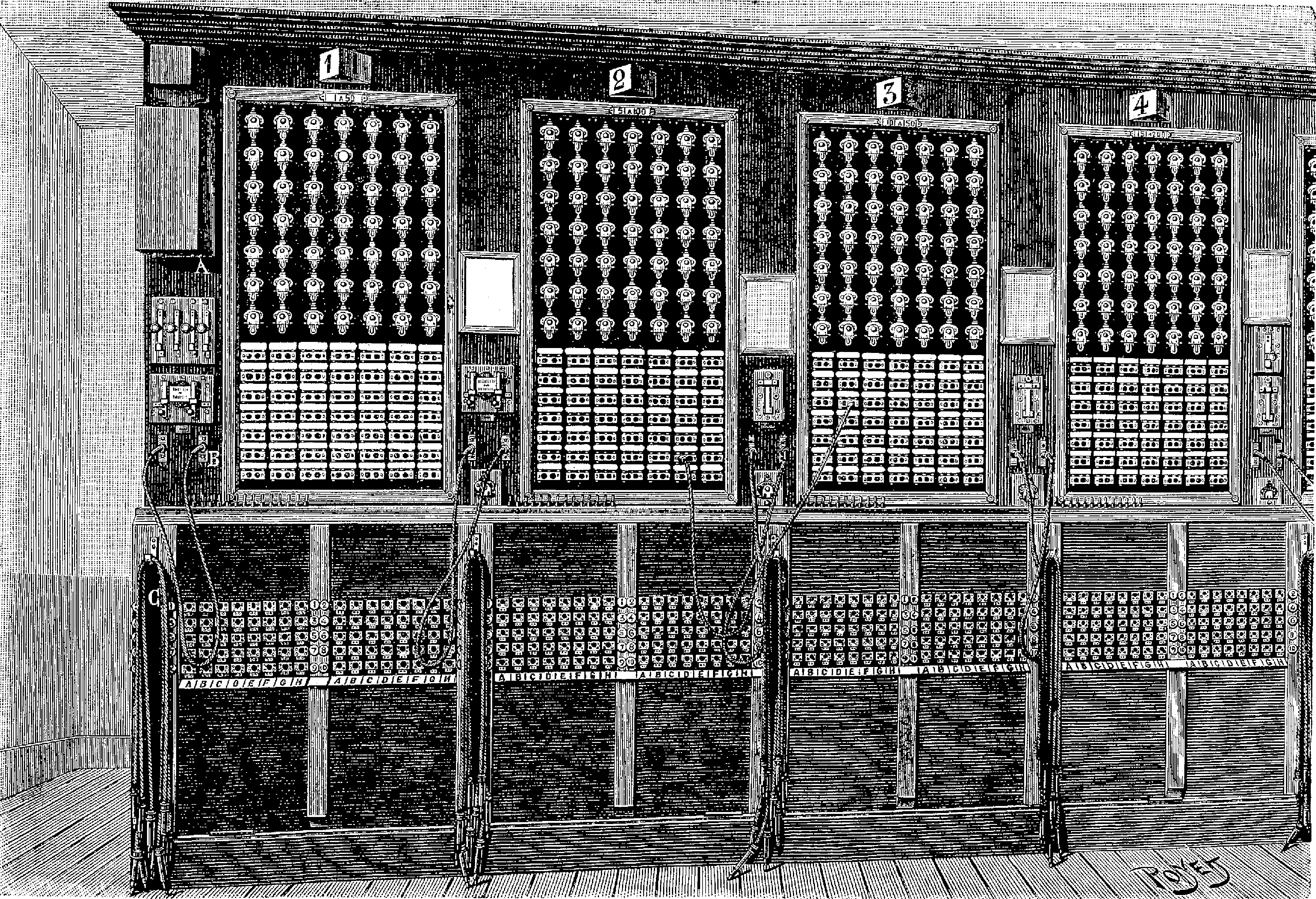
Central office of the Société générale des téléphones in La Villette, Paris, 1891

Lair bought the Magasins Généraux d'Auhervilliers et de Saint-Denis, doubling the size of the enterprise. In 1881, after the first telephony experiments, Lair conceived the great project of organizing a telephone network in France. Jules Lair organized the Société générale des Téléphones^{(fr)} in 1881, which was taken over by the state in 1889. Lazare Weiller collaborated with Lair in manufacturing and distributing telephones. Lair was also interested in underwater telegraphy, and wanted to create a network of submarine cable connecting France to her colonies. The army and navy strongly supported this, but it did not achieve all its goals due to opposition from the Deputy of Le Havre. Lair entered into various other enterprises associated with the Crédit Industriel et Commercial. His senior management positions in addition to running the Magasins généraux included:

- President of the Société générale des téléphones, 1881–89
- President of the Comptoir des entrepôts, 1891
- President of the Compagnie française des télégraphes sous-marins, 1898
- Vice-President of the Crédit industriel, 1895
- President of the Société des mines de Czeladz, 1897
- Vice-President of the Société française des métaux, 1899
- President of the Société des docks de Rouen, 1902
- President of the Société des aciéries de France, 1902

=== Literary work ===
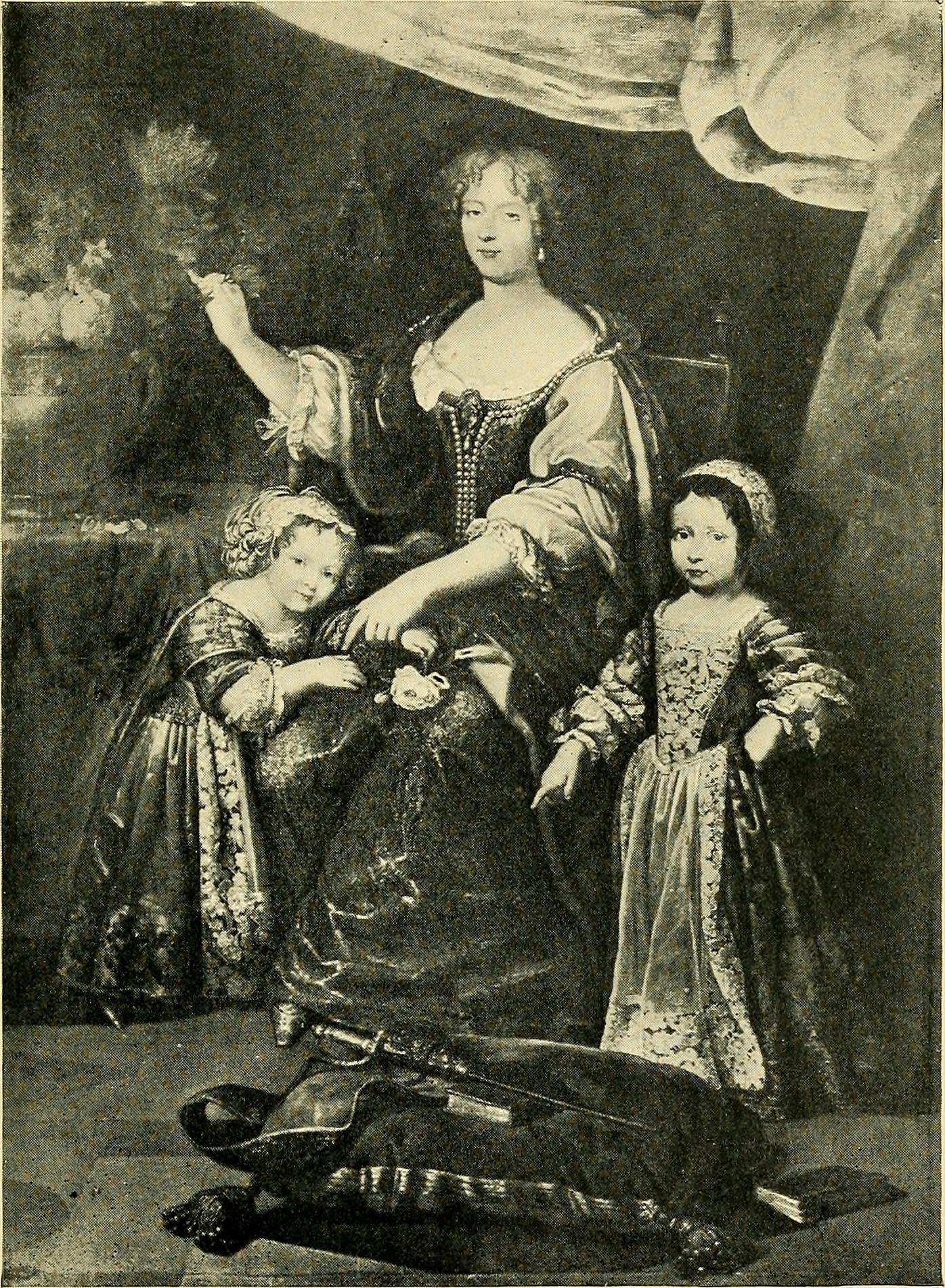
Louise de La Vallière, illustration from Louise de La Vallière et la jeunesse de Louis XIV d'après des documents inédits (1907 edition)

Throughout his business career, Lair always set aside time for historical work. He was particularly interested in the history of his native Normandy. In 1860 he published a History of the Parliament of Normandy from its translation to Caen in June 1589 until its return to Rouen in April 1594. The first volume of his Étude sur les origines de l'évêché de Bayeux (1862) prompted a lengthy rebuttal by the Abbé L. Tapin, also published in 1862. He published a new edition of Dudo of Saint-Quentin's History of the Normans which was published in Caen under the title De moribus et actis primorum Normanniae ducum in the memoirs of the Société des Antiquaires de Normandie. His long preface tried to establish that Dudo was a reliable historical source, which he was not, and the text has been criticized for careless collation and transcription. However, it has not been superseded.

As a personal gift General Trochu gave Lair a collection of letters written from abroad during the French Revolution about the events of that period, which Lair began publishing from 1872 with the help of Émile Legrand^{(fr)}. Lair's father-in-law had a country house in Bures-sur-Yvette, in the Vallée de Chevreuse, and this became an important retreat for Lair whan he could find time away from business. He wrote an engaging history of the village of Bures. While dealing with financiers and competitors, he wrote studies of such people as Louise de La Vallière, Nicolas Fouquet and Cardinal Richelieu. He continued to publish diverse works on aspects of the Middle Ages, the Sun King and the French Revolution. He always remained linked to Caen as a member of the Société des Antiquaires de Normandie, while in Paris he was an active member of the Société de l'École des Chartes.

Lair died in Paris on 16 May 1907. At the time of his death from bronchitis he was working on the Mémoires de Richelieu.

== Works ==
Works published by Lair include:

- Jules Lair (1859), De la rutelle (thèse pour la licence), Caen: impr. de G. Philippe / Faculté de droit. Paris
- Jules Lair (1859), Étude sur les "Fleurs de Normandie" (recueil de poésies latines et françaises de Marie-André de Chaligny), Caen: impr. de Domin
- Jules Lair (1860), Histoire du Parlement de Normandie depuis sa translation à Caen, au mois de juin 1589, jusqu'à son retour à Rouen, en avril 1594, Caen: Hardel
- Jules Lair (1862–1869), Étude sur les origines de l'évêché de Bayeux, vol. 1–4, Paris: [éd. divers]
- Jules Lair; Emile Legrand (1872), Documents inedits sur l'histoire de la revolution francaise. Correspondances de Paris, Vienne, Berlin, Varsovie, Constantinople, Maisonneuve
- Jules Lair (1876), Histoire de la seigneurie et de la paroisse de Bures (Seine-et-Oise), Paris: H. Champion
- Jules Lair (1881), Louise de La Vallière et la jeunesse de Louis XIV, d'après des documents inédits, avec le texte authentique des lettres de la duchesse au maréchal de Bellefonds, Paris: E. Plon
  - Jules Lair (1907), Louise de La Vallière et la jeunesse de Louis XIV d'après des documents inédits (4 ed.), Paris: Plon-Nourrit et Cie
- Jules Lair (1890), Nicolas Foucquet, procureur général, surintendant des finances, ministre d'Etat de Louis XIV, Paris: E. Plon, Nourrit et Cie
  - Jules Lair (1890), Nicolas Foucquet, vol. I: Famille, vie politique et privée de Foucquet., Paris: E. Plon
  - Jules Lair (1890), Nicolas Foucquet, vol. II: Disgrâce, procès, captivité, mort de Foucquet, destinées de sa famille, Paris: Plon
- Jules Lair (1893), Étude sur la vie et la mort de Guillaume Longue-Épée duc de Normandie, Paris: A. Picard et fils
- Jules Lair (1893), Julien Havet, 1853–1893 (Discours de M. J. Lair, président de la Société de l'École des chartes), Nogent-le-Rotrou: Imprimerie Daupeley-Gouverneur
- Jules Lair (1899), Recherches sur une maison de Paris où demeura Malherbe (Extrait du "Bulletin de la Société des antiquaires de Normandie", t. XX), Caen: H. Delesques
- Jules Lair (1899), Études critiques sur divers textes des Xe et XIe siècles, Paris: A. Picard et fils
- Jules Lair (1902), Le siège de Chartres par les Normands (911) (Extrait du "Compte rendu du LXVIIe congrès archéologique de France", tenu en 1900, à Chartres), Caen: impr. de H. Delesques
- Jules Lair (1903), Essai historique et topographique sur la bataille de Formigny (15 avril 1450), Paris: H. Champion

== Sources ==
- Dudo of St. Quentin; Christiansen, Eric (1998), History of the Normans, Boydell & Brewer Ltd, ISBN 978-0-85115-552-4
- Jolly, Jean (1960–1977), "Weiller (Lazare)", Dictionnaire des parlementaires français de 1889 à 1940 (in French), Paris: Presses universitaires de France, ISBN 2-1100-1998-0
- Jules Lair (1836–1907) (in French), BnF: Bibliotheque nationale de France
- Passy, Louis (1907), Jules Lair (PDF) (in French), Paris: Pontoise / Imprimierie Lucien
- Perrot, Georges (1907), "Notice sur la vie et les travaux de M. Jules–Auguste Lair, membre libre de l'Académie des Inscriptions (1836–1907)", Bibliothèque de l'École des Chartes (in French), 68: 536–579, doi:10.3406/bec.1907.452376
- Tapin, L. (1862), Les Traditions du diocèse de Bayeux; réponse à M. J. Lair (in French)

,
