= Dudo of Saint-Quentin =

11th-century Norman historian

Dudo(n) was a Picard historian, and dean of Saint-Quentin, where he was born in the 960s. He was an erudite scholar and he likely acquired his education in Liège or perhaps Laon. By 987, Dudo had become a canon at St Quentin, the abbacy of which was held by the counts of Vermandois. In that year he was sent on a diplomatic mission to Richard I of Normandy by Albert I, Count of Vermandois, which was successful. Dudo became a frequent visitor to the Norman court in the two years prior to Richard's death in 996. In a letter to Adalbero, Bishop of Laon, Dudo said that, as a result, Richard asked him to write a work recording "the customs and deeds of the Norman Land, the rights established within the kingdom of his grandfather Rollo". During a second stay in Normandy, Dudo wrote his history of the Normans, a task which Duke Richard had urged him to undertake. Very little else is known about his life, except that he died before 1043.

== Historia Normannorum ==
Written between 996 and 1015, his Historia Normannorum—also known as Libri III de moribus et actis primorum Normanniae ducum and Gesta Normannorum—was dedicated to Adalberon, bishop of Laon. Dudo does not appear to have consulted any existing documents for his history, but to have obtained his information from oral tradition, much of it being supplied by Raoul, count of Ivry, a maternal half-brother of Duke Richard. Consequently, the Historia partakes of the nature of a romance, and on this ground has been regarded as untrustworthy by historians such as Ernst Dümmler and Georg Waitz. Other authorities, such as Jules Lair and Johannes Steenstrup, while admitting the existence of a legendary element, regard the book as of considerable value for the history of the Normans.

Although Dudo was acquainted with Virgil (Aeneid) and other Latin writers, his Latin is affected and obscure. The Historia, which is written alternately in prose and in verse of several metres, is divided into four parts, and deals with the history of the Normans from 852 to the death of Duke Richard in 996. It glorifies the Normans, and was largely used by William of Jumièges, Wace, Robert of Torigni, William of Poitiers and Hugh of Fleury in compiling their chronicles.

More recently, Leah Shopkow has argued that Carolingian writing, particularly two saints' lives, the ninth-century Vita S. Germani by Heiric of Auxerre and the early tenth-century Vita S. Lamberti by Stephen of Liège, provided models for Dudo's work.

The work was first published by André Duchesne in his Historiae Normannorum scriptores antiqui, at Paris in 1619. Another edition is in the Patrologia Latina, tome cxli, of J. P. Migne (Paris, 1844), but the best is perhaps the one edited by J. Lair (Caen, 1865).

Dudo claims that Richard I of Normandy was sent by his father William I Longsword to learn the "Dacian" (old Norse) language from a teacher called Bothon. (Note: Bernard the Dane is a convenient widely-used standardisation of the name. Dudo calls him either 'Bernard of Rouen' (L. Bernardum Rothomagensis) or 'Bernard the Dacian' (L. Bernardum Dacigenam) where 'Dacia' refers to a diocese of eastern Scandinavia, not the province bordering the Black Sea. Dudo sometimes follows the name with miles ('knight' or 'warrior').) Dudo stated in the same passage that the inhabitants of Bayeux more often spoke "Dacian" than "Roman" (i.e. Old French).

== Bibliography ==
- Christiansen, Eric (1998). Introduction. History of the Normans. By Dudo of St Quentin. The Boydell Press. ISBN 978-0-85115-552-4.
- Dudo of St Quentin (1998) [original date of authorship, late 10th century]. History of the Normans. Translated by Christiansen, Eric. The Boydell Press. ISBN 978-0-85115-552-4.
- Green, Judith A. (2023). The Normans: Power, Conquest and Culture in 11th-Century Europe. Yale University Press. ISBN 978-0-300-27037-2.
- Pohl, Benjamin (2015). Dudo of Saint-Quentin's Historia Normannorum: Tradition, Innovation and Memory. York Medieval Press. ISBN 978-1-903153-54-3.
- Shopkow, Leah (1989). "The Carolingian world of Dudo of Saint-Quentin". Journal of Medieval History. 15 (1): 19–37. doi:10.1016/0304-4181(89)90031-6.
- Shopkow, Leah (2002). "The Man from Vermandois: Dudo of St-Quentin and his Patrons". In Shopkow, Leah; Meyerson, Mark D.; Burman, Thomas E. (eds.). Religion, Text, and Society in Medieval Spain and Northern Europe: Essays in Honor of J.N. Hillgarth. Pontifical Institute of Mediaeval Studies. pp. 302–318. ISBN 978-0-88844-816-3.
