= William of Jumièges =

French monk and historian (c. 1000 – c. after 1070)

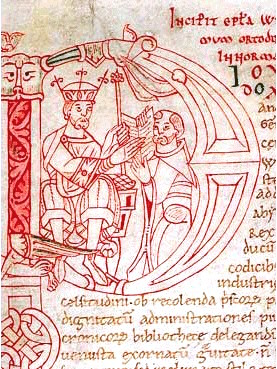
William of Jumièges (Willemus Gemeticensis) offering his Gesta Normannorum Ducum to William the Conqueror

William of Jumièges (born c. 1000 – died after 1070) (French: Guillaume de Jumièges) was a contemporary of the events of 1066, and one of the earliest writers on the subject of the Norman conquest of England. He is himself a shadowy figure, only known by his dedicatory letter to William the Conqueror as a monk of Jumièges. Since he also mentions that he was an eyewitness of some events from the reign of Duke Richard III (1026-7), it seems reasonable to assume that he was born some time about the year 1000. He probably entered the monastery during the first quarter of the eleventh century and received his education from Thierry de Mathonville. According to Orderic Vitalis, William's nickname was "Calculus". The meaning behind this nickname is unknown. His death, after 1070, is unrecorded. He was a Norman writing from a Norman point of view. Although only a monk with evidently no military training, he wrote with pride in the accomplishments of his people.

William of Jumièges was the original compiler of the history known as the Gesta Normannorum Ducum ("Deeds of the Dukes of the Normans"), written in about 1070. This was built upon the framework of an earlier history compiled by Dudo of Saint-Quentin, De moribus et actis primorum Normannorum ducum, between c. 996 and c. 1015. This work was commissioned by Duke Richard I, and "was renewed by his half-brother, Count Rodulf of Ivry, and his son Duke Richard II (996-1026)... Dudo's work was taken up by William of Jumièges in the 1050s, who revised, abbreviated and updated his De moribus and added an account of the reigns of Dukes Richard II, Richard III (1026-7), Robert I (1027-35), and William II [William the Conqueror]." He finished this by 1060 but added to it later when William the Conqueror had become king of England, bringing events up to 1070. The Gesta Normannorum Ducum was later expanded by the 12th-century monkish chroniclers Orderic Vitalis and Robert of Torigni.

== Sources ==
- The Gesta Normannorum Ducum of William of Jumièges, Orderic Vitalis and Robert of Torigni, edited and translated by Elisabeth M. C. Van Houts, Clarendon Press, Oxford, 1995.
- The Battle of Hastings, Interpretations and Sources, edited by Stephen Morillo, The Boydell Press, 1996.
