= Robert of Torigni =

Norman monk and chronicler (c. 1110 – 1186)

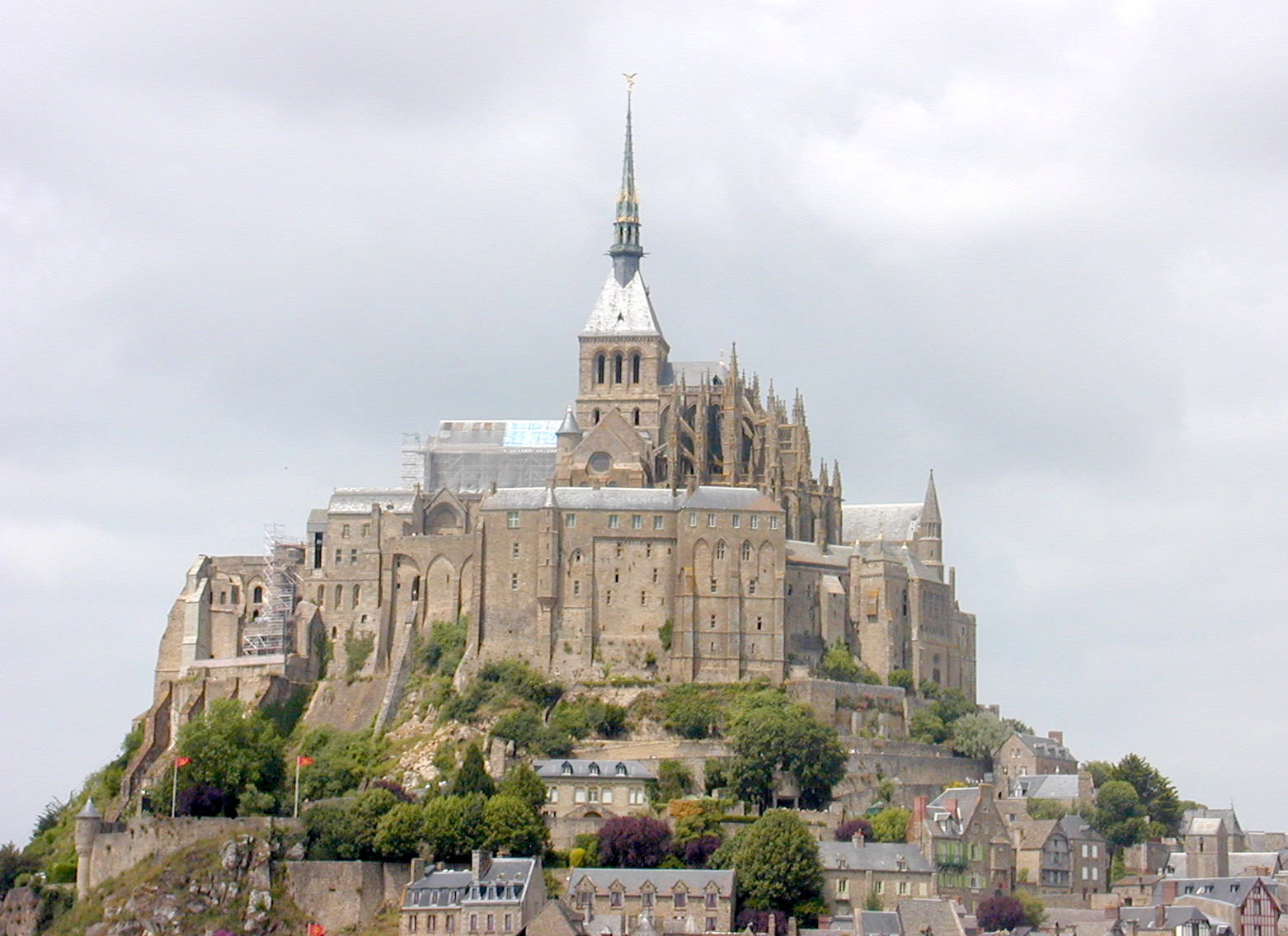
The Abbey of Mont Saint-Michel in Normandy

Robert of Torigni or Torigny (French: Robert de Torigni; c. 1110 – 1186), also known as Robert of the Mont (Latin: Robertus de Monte; French: Robert de Monte; also Robertus de Monte Sancti Michaelis, in reference to the abbey of Mont Saint-Michel), was a Norman monk, prior, and abbot. He is most remembered for his chronicles detailing English history of his era.

== Religious life ==
Robert was born at Torigni-sur-Vire, Normandy c. 1110, most probably to an aristocratic family, but his family name was abandoned when he entered Bec Abbey in 1128. In 1149 Robert of Torigni became the prior of Bec replacing Roger de Bailleul who had by that time become abbot. In 1154 Robert became the abbot of Mont Saint-Michel in Normandy. In November 1158 Robert hosted the kings Louis VII of France and Henry II of England at Mont Saint-Michel. Three years later Robert de Torigni, along with Achard of St. Victor, Bishop of Avranches, stood as sponsors (godfathers) to Eleanor, born to Henry II of England and Queen Eleanor at Domfront in 1161. In 1163 he was in Rome. He was also known to have visited England representing Mont Saint-Michel. In June 1186 Robert died and was buried in the nave of the chapel at Mont Saint-Michel under a simple grave marker. In 1876 a lead disc was found in his coffin bearing his epitaph. The translation reads: "Here lies Robert Torigni, abbot of this place, who ruled the monastery 32 years, and lived 80 years".

== Character ==
Robert developed a reputation as being a pious monk, an accomplished diplomat, a skilled organiser and a great lover and collector of books. Under Robert de Torigni Mont Saint-Michel became a great centre of learning, with sixty monks producing copious manuscripts and a library collection so vast it was called the Cité des Livres ('City of Books'). Robert himself was called "The Great Librarian of the Mont". Robert's principal interest was not so much in man's path to salvation, or in the moral lessons of history; it was in what he called "chronography" (organizing historical events in chronological order). He made no attempts to interpret history but wrote plainly "without a trace of romance in his soul."

The 19th-century English archivist Joseph Stevenson said Torigni was not always correct in his chronology and made errors even in matters in Normandy of which he should have known better, yet he was always honest and truthful and his mistakes did not greatly affect the overall value of his chronicle. Modern writers too have pointed out errors in his work; (Note: Elisabeth van Houts in her article ('Robert of Torigni as Genealogist', Studies in Medieval History presented to R. Allen Brown, Boydell Press, 1989, p. 222) suggests that not all the mistakes in Robert de Torigni's Chronicles are his own, that a few are attributable to modern historians who have difficulty with his narrative-style genealogies.) and where he has given confusing or conflicting accounts. Léopold Delisle wrote that it was through Robert's affection for Henry II that he made almost no mention in his chronicle of the death of Thomas Becket or Henry II's involvement therein.

== Works ==
Robert is best known as the last of the three contributors to the Gesta Normannorum Ducum ('Deeds of the Norman Dukes'), a chronicle originally written by William of Jumièges, appended to by Orderic Vitalis and lastly Robert de Torigni, who brought the history up to the time of Henry I. Robert relied more on Orderic's work than that of William of Jumièges and added information regarding the reign of William the Conqueror, a history of Bec, and a volume on Henry I. Another source he used was Henry of Huntingdon's Historia Anglorum. Henry, the Archdeacon of Huntingdon, had visited Bec in 1139 and during his stay there provided Robert with much of the information regarding the reign of Henry I which Robert used in his own chronicles. Robert, in turn, introduced Henry to a new work by Geoffrey of Monmouth, the Historia Regum Britanniae, a copy of which first reached Bec about 1138.

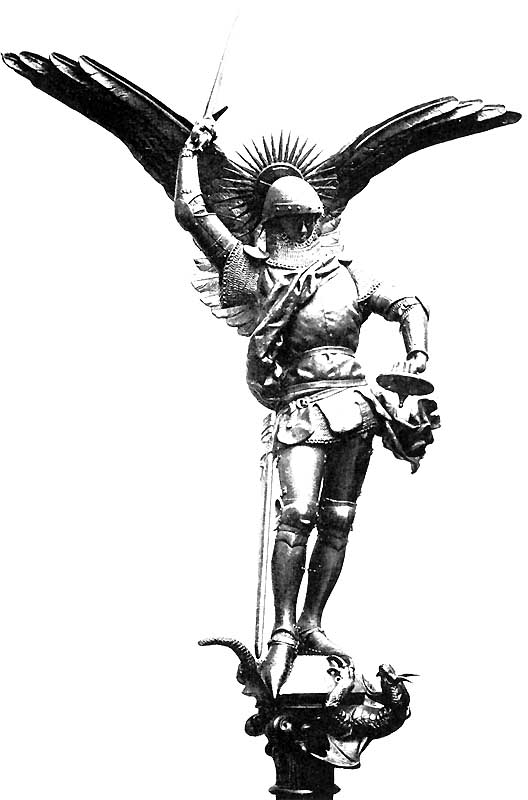
The Archangel Michael guards the steeple of Mont Saint-Michel

John Bale, the sixteenth-century English churchman and historian, in his Index Britanniae Scriptorum, identified Robert as the author of two Arthurian romances, based in part on the author's initialling his work with the letter "R". These were De Ortu Waluuanii and Historia Meriadoci, but this identification remains controversial and is doubted by some authorities. (Note: Dr. James Bruce analyzed the writing style of these two romances compared to the writings of Robert de Torigni. His opinion was they did not match, and also pointed out how Bale made the mistake of attributing these romances to Robert based on an incorrect assumption. Additional evidence shows these romances to be the products of thirteenth century writers, not twelfth. See: Two Arthurian Romances of the XIIIth Century in Latin Prose, ed. J. Douglas Bruce (Johns Hopkins Press, 1913), pp. x-xv, sub: "II. Bale's ascription of the romances to Robert de Torigni". Also see: Mildred Leake Day, Latin Arthurian literature (Cambridge: Brewer, 2005), pp. 3–11 for more discussion.)

=== Editions ===
- Howlett, Richard, ed. (1889). "The chronicle of Robert of Torigni". Chronicles of the Reigns of Stephen, Henry II, and Richard I: Volume 4: The Chronicle of Robert of Torigni, Abbot of the Monastery of St Michael-in-Peril-of-the-Sea (in Latin). Her Majesty's Stationery Office. pp. 3–316.
