= Constance of Penthièvre =

- Viscountess of Rohan
- Tenure: Viscountess consort of Rohan
- Born: 1140
- Died: after 1184
- Spouse: Alan III, Viscount of Rohan
- Issue: Alan IV; William; Josselin; Margaret; Alix; Constance
- House: Penthièvre
- Father: Alan of Penthièvre
- Mother: Bertha, Duchess of Brittany

Constance of Penthièvre (1140 – after 1184) was a Breton princess, daughter of Alan of Penthièvre, 1st Earl of Richmond, and Bertha of Cornouaille, suo jure Duchess of Brittany.

== Life ==
Constance was the daughter of Bertha, daughter of Conan III, Duke of Brittany and Matilda FitzRoy, and of Alan the Black, Earl of Richmond, younger son of Stephen of Penthièvre and Havoise of Guingamp. She was the sister of Duke Conan IV of Brittany and Enoguen, Abbess of Saint-Sulpice.

On 15 September 1146, her father died and two years later her mother married Odo II, Viscount of Porhoët, who became regent of Brittany during Conan IV's minority.

== Marriages ==
In 1160, after the marriage of her brother Conan IV with Margaret of Huntingdon, the sister of the Scots king Malcolm IV, a marriage between Malcolm and Constance was considered. Constance refused, hoping to wed King Louis VII, whose wife Constance of Castile had just died. However, Louis VII decided to marry Adèle of Champagne instead.

Constance married firstly William FitzEmpress, a.k.a. “Tournemine”, third son of Geoffrey V, Count of Anjou and Empress Matilda, and younger brother of King Henry II of England and Geoffrey, Count of Nantes. William was the founder of the House of Tournemine. However, there is no evidence for this marriage, and no evidence of William Tournemine's exact identity either (Note: Several theories about the identity of the founder of the House of Tournemine exist but most of them are contradicted by historical facts. Anatole de Barthélemy mentions some of them: (1) the first Tournemine was an Edward Tournemine, nephew of the King of England, who fought with Peter Mauclerc against the King of France and married Peter's younger sister Constance; (2) Edward Tournemine, an English captain, was sent to Brittany by Henry II of England to help Conan IV fighting his step-father Odo and the grateful Duke gave him estates in Brittany as well as his sister Constance's hand in marriage; (3) the first lord of Tournemine married the younger sister of Guy of Thouars, Constance of Brittany's third husband; (4) William FitzEmpress, Henry II's younger brother, married Conan IV's sister Constance) If this marriage did take place, it must have been celebrated after Louis VII married Adèle of Champagne on 13 November 1160.

Constance married secondly Alan III, Viscount of Rohan, and founded the Abbaye Notre-Dame de Bon-Repos with him on 23 June 1184. She probably died soon after and her husband remarried.

== Issue ==
If Constance did marry William of Tournemine, she was the mother of:

- Oliver I of Tournemine († before 1205), who married Edie (or Eline) of Penthièvre, daughter of Rivallo, Count of Penthièvre and sister of Geoffrey III of Penthièvre. They had three sons and two daughters:
  - Oliver II of Tournemine († c. 1232), Lord of La Hunaudaye;
  - Geoffrey I of Tournemine;
  - Peter of Tournemine;
  - Margilia of Tournemine;
  - Sybilla of Tournemine.
- Geoffrey of Tournemine.

With Alan III, Viscount of Rohan, she had:

- Alan IV
- William;
- Josselin, who married Matilda of Montfort, daughter of William II of Montfort (Note: Josselin may be Alan's son through his second wife Françoise)
- Margaret, who married Harvey I, Lord of Léon
- Alix;
- Constance, who married Odo of Pontchâteau

== Sources ==
- Baldwin, John W. (1986). The Government of Philip Augustus: Foundations of French Royal Power in the Middle Ages. University of California Press.
- Morvan, Frederic (2009). La Chevalerie bretonne et la formation de l'armee ducale, 1260-1341 (in French). Presses Universitaires de Rennes.

Unknown	Viscountess consort of Rohan	Succeeded by Françoise of Corbey
