= Honour of Richmond =

Historic district in Yorkshire, England

Honour of Richmond Richmondshire
- Feudal barony
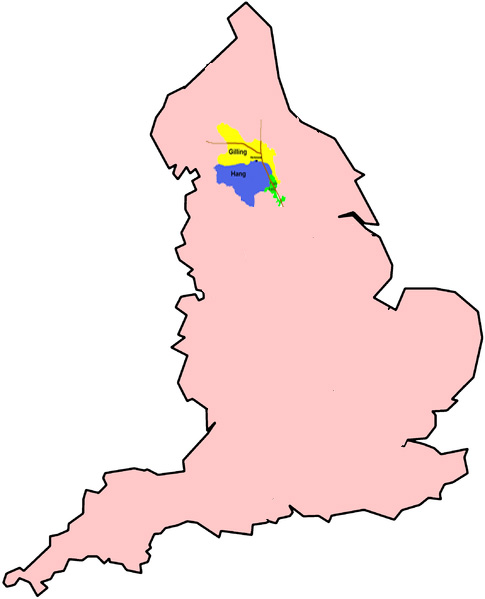
- The honour's location in England
- History
  - Succeeded by: Richmondshire (an equivalent non-metropolitan district after the honour had long been disbanded)
  - HQ: Richmond
- Subdivisions
  - Type: Wapentakes and manors
  - Units: Gilling; Hang; Hallikeld

The Honour of Richmond (or Richmondshire) was a feudal barony in what is now mainly North Yorkshire, England. The honour was two tiers below Yorkshire, the middle tier being the North Riding.

Before the honour was created, the land was held by Edwin, Earl of Mercia who died in 1071. The honour was granted to Count Alan Rufus (also known as Alain le Roux) by King William the Conqueror (as a gift of thanks for his services in the Conquest) sometime from after the Domesday Book of 1068 to just after the earl's death in 1071, the date is uncertain.

The honour comprised 60 knight's fees and was one of the most important fiefdoms in Norman England. According to the 14th-century Genealogia of the lords of Richmond, Alan Rufus built a stronghold in the district. The buildings were later known as Richmond Castle which is alluded to in the Domesday survey as forming a ‘castlery’.

== Territory ==
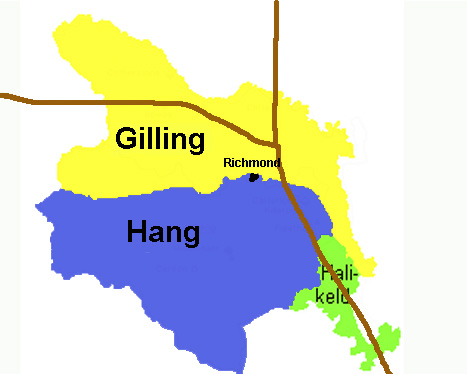
The composition of the Honour of Richmond in 1071

The manor of Gilling was the caput of the barony until Count Alan moved it to Richmond Castle. Richmond castle was in ruins by 1540 but was restored centuries later and is now a tourist attraction.

The Honour of Richmond, being 60 km (37 mi) from east to west and 45 km (28 mi) from north to south, comprised most of the land between the River Tees and the River Ure and ranged in its landscape from the bleak mountainous areas of the Pennines to the fertile lowlands of the Vale of York. The district, throughout most of its history, consisted of three main land divisions; the wapentakes of Hang (later divided east and west), Gilling (later divided east and west) and Hallikeld.

=== Gilling ===
The Gilling wapentake or Gillingshire (later two wapentakes) consisted mainly of land which lay between the rivers Tees (to the north with the County of Durham on the other side), Wiske (to the east with Allertonshire on the other side). The north bordered land granted to the Prince Bishops of Durham. The watershed between the River Swale and the River Ure was the southern border with the Hang Wapentake while the western border was the Pennines.

=== Hang ===
The division of Hang, or Hangshire, had the River Swale as its northern boundary; its western boundary was the Pennine watershed and its southern boundary was the watershed with the River Wharfe and the River Nidd. The eastern border followed small streams and minor landmarks from the previous watershed to the Swale. The wapentake meeting place was situated on the Hang Beck in Finghall parish.

=== Hallikeld ===
The third part of the territory, Hallikeld, consisted of the parishes lying between the River Ure and the River Swale until their confluence at Ellenthorpe.

== List of feudal barons of Richmond ==
The feudal barons of Richmond were usually referred to as Lords of Richmond. The Honour of Richmond was sometimes held separately from the titles Earl of Richmond, and later Duke of Richmond. Grants were sometimes partial, and sometimes included or excluded Richmond Castle as noted in the list below. The descent of the barony was as follows:

- Alan Rufus, Count of Brittany (d.1093), who died without issue.
- Alan the Black (d.1098), brother of Alan Rufus, who also died without issue.
- Stephen, Count of Tréguier (d. 1135/6), brother.
- Alan, 1st Earl of Richmond (d.1146), (alias Alan The Black, or le Noir), younger son.
- Conan IV, Duke of Brittany (d.1171), son, who left as his heir a daughter Constance (d.1201), a ward of the king.
- Held in wardship by King Henry II pending the marriage of his son Geoffrey to Constance, the daughter of Conan IV
- Constance, Duchess of Brittany (d.1201), Conan's daughter and hereditary Countess of Richmond
- Geoffrey II, Duke of Brittany(d.1186) first husband of Constance
- Ranulph, Earl of Chester (d.1232), second husband of Constance, whom she married in 1188 and whom she divorced in 1199. (Note: However, Ranulph never ruled Richmond or Brittany during their marriage.)
- Guy of Thouars – third husband of Constance; forfeited to King John in 1203 upon taking up arms with the French to avenge the death of Arthur I
- Alix, Duchess of Brittany (d. 1221), Constance and Guy's elder daughter. (Note: A charter made by Alix before her marriage to Peter I deals with the Honour of Richmond; Alix also styled herself Countess of Richmond before her husband received the Earldom from King Henry III. See Judith Everard and Michael Jones, The Charters of Duchess Constance and Her Family (1171–1221), The Boydell Press, 1999, pp 169–171.)
  - Eleanor of Brittany, Constance and Geoffrey's elder daughter. (Note: Although King John allowed her to use the titles Duchess of Brittany and Countess of Richmond, she was imprisoned by English kings and never ruled. See Judith Everard and Michael Jones, The Charters of Duchess Constance and Her Family (1171–1221), The Boydell Press, 1999, pp 164–165.) Never actually given any lands of the earldom, she ceased to be styled as Countess of Richmond in 1218; while in 1235 Swaffham manor was given to her, her title was never restored.
- Peter I, Duke of Brittany (alias Pierre Mauclerc), the husband of Alix of Thouars and the son-in-law of Guy of Thouars and Constance of Brittany. He declined an offer of the Honour and the Earldom of Richmond from King John (1199–1216) due to his loyalty to the French King. He received in 1218 from William Marshal, 1st Earl of Pembroke in name of King Henry III a partial grant of the Honour, excepting 30 knight's fees south of the River Trent retained by the king, His lands were forfeited to King Henry III when he paid homage to French King Louis IX in 1235. Thus his tenure of the barony varied according to his allegiance in the war between England and France.
- William of Savoy, Bishop elect of Valence, granted the Honour in August 1236.
- Peter II, Count of Savoy, popularly known as Earl of Richmond, to whom the barony was granted by King Henry III in 1240. He sought and received a royal confirmation of his holding in 1262. He had felt his tenure at risk due to the negotiations for the marriage of Beatrice, daughter of King Henry III to John, son of John I, Duke of Brittany (d.1286) who was son of Alix, Duchess of Brittany. A part of this marriage settlement stipulated that his father the duke should receive French lands equal in value to the honour of Richmond. He lost control of the barony in 1264, although he received income from it until 1266, when the barony was granted to John of Brittany, husband of Beatrice.
- John II, Duke of Brittany (d.1305), husband of Princess Beatrice.
- John of Brittany, Earl of Richmond (d.1334), son. He died unmarried without issue.
- John III, Duke of Brittany (1286–1341), nephew
- John de Montfort, Earl of Richmond – upon his death, Earldom returned to the crown in 1342; it remained with the crown during most of the Breton War of Succession in part to ensure it would not fall into the hands of the King of France.
- John of Gaunt – surrendered the Earldom and Honour, at the insistence of the King, to pursue Kingship of Castille
- John IV, Duke of Brittany, son and heir of John of Montfort; forfeited twice, in 1381 (due to the First Treaty of Guerande) and 1384 upon paying homage to French King Charles VI; the second forfeit represented the permanent loss of the Honour and the Earldom by the Dukes of Brittany.
- Anne of Bohemia
- Ralph de Neville, 1st Earl of Westmorland – Honour held for life without peerage Earl of Richmond
- John of Lancaster, 1st Duke of Bedford and 1st Earl of Richmond
- reverted to the Crown (1435–1450)
- Ralph Neville, Earl of Westmoreland – partial grant of Richmond Castle in 1450
- Edmund Tudor, 1st Earl of Richmond – father of Henry VII
- Henry Tudor – forfeited to Edward IV
- George Plantagenet, 1st Duke of Clarence – granted Honour and castle without peerage Earl of Richmond by Edward IV in 1462
- Richard, Duke of Gloucester – retained upon becoming Richard III of England
- Henry Tudor – regained the Honour upon winning the crown of England in contest with Richard III; Honour merged with the Crown
- Henry FitzRoy, Duke of Richmond and Somerset – natural son of Henry VIII of England

== See also ==
- Archdeacon of Richmond and Craven: the archdeaconry also included Boroughbridge, Amounderness Hundred, Lonsdale Hundred, Furness, Barony of Kendal and Borough of Copeland.
