= List of duchesses consort of Brittany =

Coat of arms of the Dukes of Brittany.

Some consorts of the dukes of Brittany and its predecessor states had significant influence over their spouse. Listed are the wives of the dukes of Brittany (some of whom claimed the title of king of Brittany) who were styled duchesses of Brittany. Although there were six suo jure duchesses of Brittany, the husbands of those duchesses were jure uxoris dukes and not consorts. Little is known about the duchesses whose husbands reigned prior to the year 900 besides their names.

Not all wives of the monarchs became consorts, as they may have died, been divorced, or had their marriage declared invalid prior to their husband's accession to the throne, or married him after his abdication. Such cases include

- Beatrice of England, the second daughter of Henry III, King of England; only wife of John II (as the Earl of Richmond), married 22 January 1260, died 24 March 1275.
- Marie, Viscountess of Limoges, the second daughter of Guy VI, Viscount of Limoges; first wife of Arthur II (as heir to the duchy of Brittany), married 1275, died 1291.
- Isabelle of Valois, the eldest daughter of Charles I, Count of Valois; first wife of John III (as heir to the duchy of Brittany), married 1297, died 1309.
- Yolande of Anjou, the youngest daughter of Louis II of Anjou, King of Naples; first wife of Francis I (as heir to the duchy of Brittany), married 1431, died 1440.
- Margaret of Burgundy, the third daughter of John the Fearless, Duke of Burgundy; first wife of Arthur III (as Lord of Parthenay and Duke of Touraine (later Constable of France)), married 10 October 1423, died 2 February 1441.
- Jeanne d'Albret, the daughter of Charles II, Count of Dreux; second wife of Arthur III (as Lord of Parthenay and Constable of France), married 29 August 1442, died 1444.

== Queen and Duchess of Brittany ==
=== Early duchesses and queens ===
Picture	Name	Father	Birth	Marriage	Became Consort	Ceased to be Consort	Death	Spouse
	Argentaela (Note: Also Countess consort of Vannes.) (Note: Also Countess consort of Rennes.)	?	?	?	846 husband's accession	7 March 851 husband's death	?	Nominoe
	Marmohec (Note: Also Countess consort of Nantes.)	?	?	?	7 March 851 husband's accession	before 857		Erispoe
	Wembrit (Note: Also Countess consort of Poher.)	?	?	?	November 857 as Duchess; 868 as Queen	25 June 874 husband's death	877	Salomon
	Prostlon of Brittany	Salomon of Brittany	?	?	874 husband's accession in opposition with Gurvand	876 husband's death	877	Pasquitan
	Lotitia of Brittany	Erispoe of Brittany	?	?	874 husband's accession in opposition with Pasquitan	876 husband's death	?	Gurvand
	Unnamed	?	?	?	877 husband's accession in opposition with Alan I	888 husband's death	?	Judicael
	Oreguen of Rennes	Gurvand, Duke of Brittany	?	?	876 as Duchess; 890 as Queen	907 husband's death	?	Alan I

The succession was interrupted by the Norman occupation (907–937)

=== House of Nantes ===
Picture	Name	Father	Birth	Marriage	Became Consort	Ceased to be Consort	Death	Spouse
	Roscille of Anjou	Fulk I, Count of Anjou (Anjou)	?	925	937 husband's accession	948		Alan II
	? of Blois (Note: Countess consort of Anjou.)	Theobald the Ancient, Viscount of Blois and Tour (Blois)	?	943/8		952 husband's death	?	Alan II
	? of Blois	Theobald the Ancient, Viscount of Blois and Tour (Blois)	?	954	958 husband's accession?	960 husband's death	?	Fulk II of Anjou
	Unnamed	?	?	?	960 husband's accession	981 husband's death	?	Hoël I
	Aremburge, Lady of Ancenis	?	?	?	981 husband's accession	988 husband's death	?	Guerech

=== House of Rennes ===
Picture	Name	Father	Birth	Marriage	Became Consort	Ceased to be Consort	Death	Spouse
	Ermengarde of Anjou	Geoffrey I, Count of Anjou (Anjou)	-	973		after 982		Conan I
	Hawise of Normandy	Richard I, Duke of Normandy (Normandy)	-	996		20 November 1008 husband's death	21 February 1034	Geoffrey I
	Bertha of Blois	Odo II, Count of Blois (Blois)	-	-		1 October 1040 husband's death	11/13 April 1085	Alan III

=== House of Cornouaille ===
Picture	Name	Father	Birth	Marriage	Became Consort	Ceased to be Consort	Death	Spouse
	Constance of Normandy (Note: Also Countess consort of Cornouaille.)	William I of England (Normandy)	1061	1086		13 August 1090		Alan IV
	Ermengarde of Anjou	Fulk IV, Count of Anjou (Anjou)	1068	1093		13 October 1119 husband's death	1 June 1146	Alan IV
	Maud FitzRoy	Henry I of England (Normandy)	?	before 1113		17 September 1148 husband's death	after 1128	Conan III

=== House of Penthièvre ===
Picture	Name	Father	Birth	Marriage	Became Consort	Ceased to be Consort	Death	Spouse
	Margaret of Huntingdon (Note: Also Countess consort of Richmond)	Henry of Scotland, 3rd Earl of Huntingdon (Dunkeld)	1140	1160		20 February 1171 husband's death	1201	Conan IV

=== House of Dreux ===
Picture	Name	Father	Birth	Marriage	Became Consort	Ceased to be Consort	Death	Spouse
	Blanche of Navarre (Note: Also Countess consort of Penthièvre.)	Theobald I of Navarre (Champagne)	1226	16 January 1236		11/12 August 1283		John I
	Yolande de Dreux, Countess of Montfort-l'Amaury	Robert IV, Count of Dreux (Dreux)	1263	May 1292/4	18 November 1305 husband's accession	27 August 1312 husband's death	2 August 1330	Arthur II
	Isabella of Castile	Sancho IV of Castile (Anscarids)	1283	21 June 1310	27 August 1312 husband's accession	24 July 1328		John III
	Joanna of Savoy (Note: Also Countess consort of Montfort-l'Amaury.)	Edward, Count of Savoy (Savoy)	1310	21 March 1330		30 April 1341 husband's death	29 June 1344	John III

=== House of Montfort ===
Picture	Name	Father	Birth	Marriage	Became Consort	Ceased to be Consort	Death	Spouse
	Joanna of Flanders	Louis, Count of Nevers (Dampierre)	1295	March 1329	30 April 1341 husband's accession	16 September 1345 husband's death	September 1374	John of Montfort
	Mary of England	Edward III of England (Plantagenet)	10 October 1344	summer of 1361		1362		John IV
	Joan de Holland	Thomas Holland, 1st Earl of Kent (Holland)	1350	May 1366		after 25 December 1384		John IV
	Joanna of Navarre	Charles II of Navarre (Évreux)	1370	2 October 1386		1 November 1399 husband's death	9 July 1437	John IV
	Joan of France (Note: Also titular Countess consort of Richmond.)	Charles VI of France (Valois)	24 January 1391	19 September 1396	1 November 1399 husband's accession	27 September 1433		John V
	Isabella of Scotland	James I of Scotland (Stewart)	autumn of 1426	30 October 1442		18 July 1450 husband's death	13 October 1494/5 March 1499	Francis I
	Françoise d'Amboise (Note: Also Countess consort of Guingamp.)	Louis d'Amboise, Viscount of Thouars and Prince of Talmond (Amboise)	29 May 1427	June 1441/2	18 July 1450 husband's accession	22 September 1457 husband's death	4 November 1485	Peter II
	Catherine of Luxembourg-Saint-Pol (Note: Also Countess consort of Ivry.)	Peter of Luxembourg, Count of Saint-Pol (Luxembourg-Saint-Pol)	?	2 July 1445	22 September 1457 husband's accession	26 December 1458 husband's death	1492	Arthur III
	Margaret of Brittany (Note: Also Countess consort of Étampes.) (Note: Also Countess consort of Vertus.)	Francis I, Duke of Brittany (Montfort)	1443	16 November 1455	26 December 1458 husband's accession	25 September 1469		Francis II
	Margaret of Foix	Gaston IV, Count of Foix (Foix)	1453	27 June 1471/4		15 May 1486		Francis II
	Catherine de' Medici (Note: Also Duchess consort of Orléans.) (Note: Also Dauphine of Viennois, Countess consort of Valentinois and of Diois.) (Note: Also Dauphine of France.)	Lorenzo II de' Medici, Duke of Urbino (Medici)	13 April 1519	28 October 1533	10 August 1536 husband's accession	31 March 1547; Brittany ceased to exist	5 January 1589	Henry

== See also ==
- Countess of Dreux

== Sources ==
- Marek, Miroslav. "Rulers of Bretagne". Genealogy.EU.
