= White Greyhound of Richmond =

The Queen's Beasts sculpture

The White Greyhound of Richmond
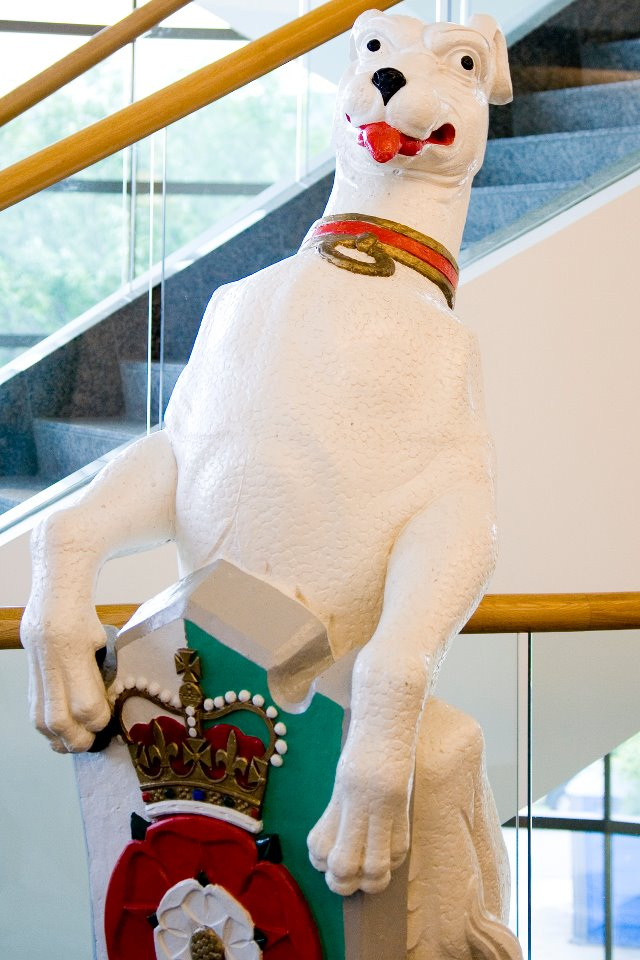
- Artist: James Woodford
- Year: 1953
- Type: Sculpture
- Medium: Plaster
- Dimensions: 213 cm × 91.5 cm × 91.5 cm (84 in × 36.0 in × 36.0 in)
- Location: Canadian Museum of History, Gatineau
- Owner: Government of Canada
- Accession: 980.9.6
- Website: http://www.historymuseum.ca/collections/artifact/132923

The White Greyhound of Richmond is one of the Queen's Beasts commissioned for display at the coronation of Elizabeth II in 1953. A stone copy can also be found in the Royal Botanic Gardens, Kew.

The Tudor Rose, royally crowned.

== Description ==
According to the Cambridge University Heraldic and Genealogical Society:

"The White Greyhound of Richmond bears a shield of Tudor livery, white and green, with a Tudor Rose ensigned by a Royal Crown. Henry VII sometimes used greyhounds as supporters and on his standards. His father, Edmund Tudor, was created Earl of Richmond and the white greyhound was associated with the Honour of Richmond. The rose in the badge shows the association of the red and the white elements of Lancaster and York respectively, emphasising the union of the rival houses."

== History ==
Originally a badge held by John of Gaunt, 1st Duke of Lancaster during his 14th century tenure as steward/earl of the Honour of Richmond, it was the canine breed most favoured in Northern England. This animal was further used for John of Lancaster, 1st Duke of Bedford and George Plantagenet, 1st Duke of Clarence and is supposed to stand for the honour, regardless of who has held or been in charge of it, although Peter II, Count of Savoy was not known to have any unique symbol to depict his stewardship of Richmond.

Although they were legitimately entitled to the feudal estate, the badge was not used by any Duke of Brittany, preferring to use their traditional ermine until Francis II, Duke of Brittany willed Richmond to Henry VII of England—the chief representative of the House of Lancaster, which simultaneously legitimised the title to the Tudor dynasty and reversed the effect of the attainder made by Richard III of England as chief representative of the House of York and swung the loyalty of Richmondshire against the Ricardian regime, rolling back jure uxoris control through the marriages to Cecily Neville, Anne Neville and Isabella Neville, as descendants of the Nevilles who held Middleham. Henry VII subsequently replaced the English lion with the White Greyhound, in the coat of arms of England, opposite the Y Ddraig Goch of Wales.
