= Alan III, Viscount of Rohan =

French noble (1135–1195)

Alan III of Rohan
- Born: c. 1135/40
- Died: 1195
- Noble family: Rohan
- Spouse: Constance of Penthièvre
- Father: Alan II

Alan III de Rohan (c. 1135/40 – 1195), was the son of Alan II, Viscount of Rohan. He was the 3rd Viscount of Rohan and Lord of Corlay.

== Life ==
He married Constance of Penthièvre, daughter of Alan of Penthièvre and Bertha, Duchess of Brittany. They had six children:

- Alan IV, (c. 1166 - 1205);
- William (died after 1205);
- Josselin (died in 1251), Lord of Noyal, regent of the Viscounty of Rohan in 1235 married Maude of Montfort, Lady of Montfort and of Boutavan (1235-1279);
- Margaret, who married Harvey I, Lord of Léon;
- Alix;
- Constance, who married Odo of Pontchâteau

Alan III and his wife Constance built the Abbaye Notre-Dame de Bon-Repos on 23 June 1184.

Constance died at an unknown date after 23 June 1184 and Alan married Françoise of Corbey.

== Coat of arms ==
Former arms of the House of Rohan: Gules seven mascles or 3, 3, 1.

== See also ==
- House of Rohan
- Viscounty of Rohan

Alan III, Viscount of Rohan House of Rohan Born: 1135/40 Died: 1195
Regnal titles
Preceded by Alan II	Viscount of Rohan; 1168–1195	Succeeded by Alan IV
