= Hoel III of Nantes =

French nobleman

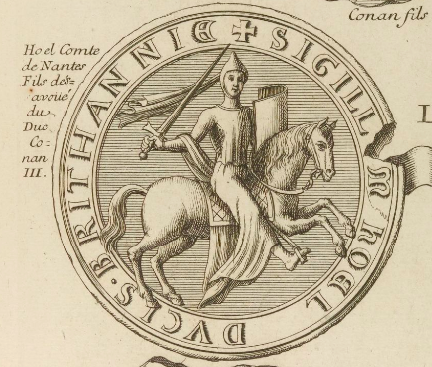

Hoël III of Cornwall (died 1156) was count of Nantes, from 1148 to his death. He was raised the son of Duke Conan III and Maud FitzRoy, an illegitimate daughter of King Henry I of England. However, he was disinherited by his father when on his death-bed, as Conan III claimed that Hoël III was illegitimate and no son of his. Bertha then became heiress to Duke Conan's lands in Brittany, while Hoèl was allowed to remain Count of Nantes. He was accused by St. Bernard of Clairvaux of having an incestuous affair with his sister Bertha.

The traditional story of the disinheritance might be a fable. Viscount Charles de la Lande de Calan proposed, in 1908, that Hoël III was an illegitimate son for whom Conan III decided to provide Nantes for his support. The name Hoël had been used for illegitimate sons of the counts of Nantes. Katharine Keats-Rohan, in 1996, proposed that Conan III disinherited his legitimate son for the purpose of unifying Brittany through the marriage of his daughter Bertha to her cousin Alan, whose father inherited two of the provinces of Brittany. Hoël III was given Nantes for his lifetime. This arrangement would have required years of planning to implement, and might have begun before Hoël III was born.

Supported by Geoffrey FitzEmpress, Henry II's younger brother in 1156 the Nantaise rebelled against Hoël III and drove him out of the country. Control of Nantes was part of a larger strategy in the ongoing war between Stephen of England and Empress Matilda. With his sister's marriage to Alan, 1st Earl of Richmond, Brittany entered the conflict on the side of Stephen.

Shortly after his exile from Nantes, Hoël III of Cornwall may have sought sanctuary at the Cistercian abbey of Melleray, where he may have died shortly thereafter.

== See also ==
- Dukes of Brittany family tree

Regnal titles
Preceded by Conan III	— DISPUTED — Duke of Brittany; 1148-1156; Disputed by Bertha and Odo II	Succeeded by Conan IV
Preceded by Conan III	Count of Rennes; 1148-1156	Succeeded by Conan IV
Preceded by Conan III	Count of Nantes; 1148-1156	Succeeded by Geoffrey I
