= Alan IV =

Alan IV may refer to:

- Alan IV, Duke of Brittany (died 1119)
- Alan IV, Viscount of Rohan (1166–1205)
