= Matilda FitzRoy, Duchess of Brittany =

Illegitimate daughter of Henry I of England (fl. 12th century)

- Spouse: Conan III, Duke of Brittany
- Issue: Hoel III, Count of Nantes; Bertha, Duchess of Brittany; Constance
- Father: Henry I of England

Maud or Matilda Fitzroy was a duchess consort of Brittany by her marriage to Conan III, Duke of Brittany. She was an illegitimate daughter of Henry I of England by one of his unknown mistresses.

== Duchess consort of Brittany ==
Matilda married, before 1113, Conan III, Duke of Brittany, and had:

- Hoel (1116–1156) – disinherited from the Ducal crown; Count of Nantes;
- Bertha (1114 – after 1155) – married Alan of Penthièvre; (Note: King Stephen of England created Alan 1st Earl of Richmond and 1st Earl of Cornwall) upon Alan's death in 1146, she returned to Brittany.
- Constance (1120–1148) – married Sir Geoffroy II, Sire de Mayenne, son of Juhel II, Seigneur de Mayenne.

== Sources ==
- Bryan, Elizabeth J. (2016). "Matthew Parker and the Middle English Prose Brut". In Rajsic, Jaclyn; Kooper, Erik; Hoche, Dominique (eds.). The Prose Brut and Other Late Medieval Chronicles. York Medieval Press.
- Warren, Wilfred Lewis (1977). Henry II. Yale University Press.

Preceded by Ermengarde of Anjou	Duchess consort of Brittany ca. 1113–1148	Succeeded by Margaret of Huntingdon
