= Ermengarde of Anjou (died 1146) =

French noblewoman

Duchess consort of Aquitaine
- Tenure: c. 1089 – c. 1091

Duchess consort of Brittany
- Tenure: 1093–1112
- Born: c. 1068; Angers
- Died: 1 June 1146; Jerusalem
- Burial: Ille-et-Vilaine
- Spouse: William IX, Duke of Aquitaine; Alan IV, Duke of Brittany
- Issue more...: Conan III, Duke of Brittany
- House: House of Anjou
- Father: Fulk IV, Count of Anjou
- Mother: Hildegarde of Beaugency

Ermengarde of Anjou (c. 1068 – 1 June 1146), also known as Ermengarde of Brittany, was a member of the comital House of Anjou and by her two marriages was successively Duchess of Aquitaine and Brittany. She was also a patron of Fontevraud Abbey. Ermengarde was the regent of Brittany during the absence of her spouse, Duke Alan IV of Brittany, from 1096 until 1101.

== Life ==
=== Early years ===
Born in Angers she was the eldest child of Count Fulk IV of Anjou and Hildegarde of Beaugency. Having lost her mother in 1070, at only two years of age, she received an education, possibly at the abbey of Ronceray, and grew to be pious and concerned about religious reform, especially the struggle against the secular appropriation of church property. In her youth, Ermengarde was noted for her intelligence and beauty in a poem by Marbode of Rennes in which he offers also offers her spiritual guidance and advice.

=== Possible Duchess of Aquitaine ===
It has been recorded that Ermengard was the wife of William IX of Aquitaine. It has long been presumed that their marriage was arranged in 1089. However, this union proved a dismal failure. Her husband was a voracious philanderer, whose affairs infuriated his wife. She had severe mood swings, vacillating between vivacity and sullenness, and would nag her husband. She also had a habit of retiring in bad temper to a cloister after an argument, cutting off all contact with the outside world, before suddenly making a reappearance in the court as if her absence had never occurred. Such behavior, coupled with her failure to conceive a child, led William to send her back to her father and have the marriage dissolved in 1091.

However, Ruth Harvey's 1993 critical investigation shows the assumption of William's marriage to Ermengarde to be based largely on an error in a nineteenth-century secondary source and it is highly likely that Philippa of Toulouse was William's only wife. Further research has found the claim that William was married to "Hermingerda", daughter of Fulk IV of Anjou is based on the very unreliable chronicle of Archbishop William of Tyre, written between 1169 and 1187, more than 70 years after the events in question would have taken place. The archbishop erroneously identifies Ermengarde's mother as Bertrand of Montfort, the sister of Amalricus de Montfort when her mother was in fact Audearde or Hildegarde of Beaugency. The archbishop's chronicle lacks any contemporary corroboration, no primary text ever mentions a marriage between William and Ermengarde. It is therefore not only improbable that William married Ermengarde of Anjou, it is likely that he was never married to a woman named Ermengarde at all.

But Stephen Philp, poet and mediaeval historian, has counter-argued that the archbishop's apparent error in the names is not in itself proof a marriage between William and a woman named Ermengarde never took place, especially as several sources give colorful accounts of the marriage and its aftermath.

=== Duchess and regent of Brittany ===
In 1092 or 1093, her father married her to Duke Alan IV of Brittany, probably to secure an alliance against Normandy, then controlled by William the Conqueror's son, Robert Curthose. Though her marriage was arranged for political reasons this does not mean that Ermengarde would have been seen as inferior to her husband. It was not uncommon that noble women in twelfth century France actually wielded more political power than their husbands. The union produced three children: the future Duke Conan III, Hawise and, Geoffrey. It is also suggested that during her time as duchess, Ermengarde may have raised her half-brother Fulk V of Anjou alongside her own children.

Ermengarde, seemingly unhappy in her marriage to Alan IV, repeatedly attempted to have her marriage annulled so that she could focus on religious rather than public life. Her requests were denied by religious authorities on the grounds that she did not have a witness to support her claim of consanguinity. Robert of Arbrissel, whom she kept correspondence with, told Ermengarde that it was her "duty to remain in the world, despite your desire to leave it, and to fulfill God's will concerning you." This letter from Robert of Arbrissel includes over 100 biblical references as well as references to religious leaders and Roman poets, showing that Robert knew Ermengarde to be intelligent and well read. It was not uncommon that noblewomen were better educated and more literate than noblemen during the Middle Ages as women were often expected to maintain their own properties and those of their husbands.

Ermengarde was also known to receive advice from other religious leaders of the time including Geoffrey of Vendome and St. Bernard of Clairvaux. Some scholars such as Shawn Madison Krahmer have noted that the letters surviving from St. Bernard of Clairvaux to Ermengarde show a level of intimacy and fondness that would suggest a close friendship between the two rather than a simply advisory correspondence.

When her husband left in 1096 to take part in the First Crusade, Ermengarde served as Regent of the Duchy of Brittany from 1096 until 1101. Despite being a time of political instability in Brittany, Ermengarde proved to be a popular and effective ruler maintaining stability during the Duke's absence by utilizing her familial ties and alliances. Ermengarde remained active in ruling alongside Alan upon his return from the crusades. Ermengarde was also effective in her political role by having close ties and a level of influence over the church, becoming an important supporter of reforms. In a letter to Ermengarde Geoffrey of Vendome praised her abilities as a leader saying that she was "fighting for God rather than caught up in worldly affairs."

She spent little time in Rennes or the west of Brittany, preferring Nantes and the Saumur region. Influenced by Robert of Arbrissel, she approved the expansion of the abbey at Fontevraud, to which she withdrew from 1103 to 1105 due to marital issues with Alan. In 1112, Ermengarde's husband, Alan, abdicated his position as Duke and entered the monastery of Redon as a monk where he remained until his death. Ermengarde continued to rule the county alongside her son, Conan III for many years.

=== Later life ===
During her marriage to Duke Alan IV of Brittany, Ermengarde repeatedly tried to become a nun, however she was continually refused due to her being married. It was not unusual that noblewomen would retire to a monastery in later life, but it was not common for these noblewomen to take up religious vows as Ermengarde tried to. By 1116 Ermengarde was living in Fontevrault Abbey, where she reputedly became a friend of her first husband's second wife, Philippa of Toulouse. In 1118 after the death of Philippa, Ermengarde decided to avenge her deceased friend. She went south from Fontevrault to the court of her former husband, Duke William of Aquitaine, where she demanded to be recognized as the rightful Duchess. William ignored this remarkable request. Accordingly, in October 1119, she suddenly appeared at the Council of Reims, being held by Pope Calixtus II, demanding that the Pope excommunicate William, oust his mistress from the ducal palace, and restore Ermengarde to her rightful place as the Duchess of Aquitaine. The Pope "declined to accommodate her"; however, Ermengarde continued to trouble William for several years afterwards.

In 1121, Ermengarde and her half-brother, Fulk V, established a Cistercian monastery in Anjou at Louroux. The siblings signed a charter placing an endowment in the name of their father at the abbey of Ronceray in 1129, and donated gifts to the nuns.

Following Fulk's departure for the Holy Land to become King of Jerusalem (c. 1128), Ermengarde was allowed to become a Cistercian nun by St Bernard of Clairvaux at the Priory of Larrey near Dijon in 1130. She left the priory by 1132 and visited her brother, Fulk, who had just become king of Jerusalem. While visiting King Fulk in the Holy Land, Ermengarde sponsored the building of a church in Nablus near Jacob's Well. She later spent some time at the convent of Saint Anne in Jerusalem until her brother was deposed in a revolt led by Count Hugh II of Jaffa. After returning to Brittany by 1134, she and her son Conan III founded the Cistercian monastery of Benzay near Nantes in 1135.

=== Death ===
Ermengarde at one point went on crusade to Jerusalem; she returned ten years later, and some historians believe her life ended in Jerusalem at the convent of Saint Anne. But obituary lists at Redon Abbey record a date of death in 1146 in Redon where her second husband, Alan IV was buried. It is believed that she died a nun. The contradictions about her death and the records of her burial maybe indicated that in fact she died in Jerusalem, and that her body was subsequently transferred to Redon.

== Sources ==
- Livingstone, Amy (2018). "Daughter of Fulk, Glory of Brittany': Countess Ermengarde of Brittany (c.1070–1147)". In van Houts, Elisabeth (ed.). Anglo-Norman Studies XL. The Boydell Press. pp. 165–178. doi:10.1017/9781787443051.011. ISBN 9781787443051.
- Fajardo-Acosta, Fidel (2022). "Proscribed Communication: The Obscene Language of the Troubadour William IX, Duke of Aquitaine and VII Count of Poitiers". In Classen, Albrecht (ed.). Communication, Translation, and Community in the Middle Ages and Early Modern Period: New Cultural-Historical and Literary Perspectives. Walter de Gruyter GmbH. pp. 109–158.

Preceded by Hildegarde of Burgundy	Duchess consort of Aquitaine; 1089–1093	Succeeded by Philippa, Countess of Toulouse
Preceded by Constance of Normandy	Duchess consort of Brittany; 1093–1112	Succeeded by Maud FitzRoy
