= Bertha of Brittany =

French politician

Bertha of Cornouaille (fl. 1125–56), also known as Bertha of Brittany (Breton: Berthe Breizh), was the Duchess of Brittany and the Dowager Countess of Richmond from 1148 until her death. Bertha was the elder daughter of Conan III of Brittany by Maude, the illegitimate daughter of King Henry I of England. She was the last member of the Breton house of Cornouaille to reign over Brittany.

== Life ==
Bertha was the daughter of Duke Conan III of Brittany. She married the son of Stephen of Treguier, Alan the Black, and she lived in England with Alan until his death in 1146. Alan would eventually become Earl of Richmond. On his deathbed, Conan III renounced Bertha's brother Hoel as heir and designated Bertha as his heiress, Duchess of Brittany.

== Family ==
In her first marriage, by 1138, Bertha was married to Alan the Black. (Note: Alan the Black was Count of Penthièvre. He was created 1st Earl of Richmond by Stephen of England for his support against the dispossessed Empress Matilda during the English civil war. The marriage between Bertha and Alan may have been intended to bring Brittany into the English civil war on the side of Stephen.)

Bertha and Alan had three children:

- Conan IV, b. 1138, their son and heir, as Duke of Brittany and Earl of Richmond
- Constance, who married Alan III, Viscount of Rohan
- Enoguen, abbess of St. Sulpice

Bertha married her second husband, Odo, Viscount of Porhoet, in about 1148. Bertha and Odo had three children:

- Geoffroy
- Adelaide (died in 1220), Abbess of Fontevrault, mistress of Henry II, King of England
- Alix (Note: Everard states Odo and Bertha had only one daughter, Adelaide.)

== Succession ==
Bertha died between 1158 and 1164, and with her death the ducal throne passed to her son Conan. (Note: War broke out between Bertha's son Conan IV, Duke of Brittany and her second husband Odo. Odo may have made a compact with his brother-in-law, Hoel of Nantes, to divide Brittany between them. However, in late 1156 Conan IV was able to defeat Odo and secure his maternal inheritance.)

== Notes ==
Bertha of Brittany House of Cornouaille Born: c. 1114 Died: 1156
Regnal titles
| Preceded by Conan III | Duchess of Brittany; 1148–1156 | Succeeded by Conan IV |
