= Geoffrey of Rohan =

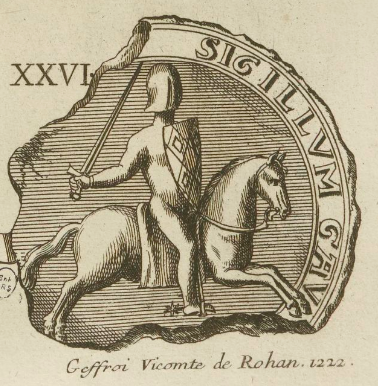
- Geoffroy de Rohan
- Born: c. 1190
- Died: 15 September 1221
- Noble family: House of Rohan
- Spouses: Margaret of Thouars; Gervaise of Dinan
- Father: Alan IV
- Mother: Mabilla of Fougères

Geoffrey of Rohan (c. 1190 – 15 September 1221) was fifth Viscount of Rohan

== Life and reign ==
Geoffrey was the eldest son of Alan IV, Viscount of Rohan and Mabilla of Fougères, and the brother of Alix, Catherine, Conan, Oliver I and Alan V.

He married firstly Margaret, daughter of Constance of Brittany and her third husband Guy of Thouars.

After Margaret's death, Geoffrey married Gervaise of Dinan, Dame of Bécherel. She was the only daughter and heiress of Alan of Dinan and Clemence of Fougères.

Geoffrey died on 15 September 1221. He had no issue and was succeeded by his younger brother Oliver.

Geoffrey of Rohan House of Rohan Born: 1190 Died: 15 September 1221
Regnal titles
Preceded by Alan IV	Viscount of Rohan; 1205–1221	Succeeded by Oliver I
