= Férel =

Commune in Brittany, France

Férel Ferel
- Commune
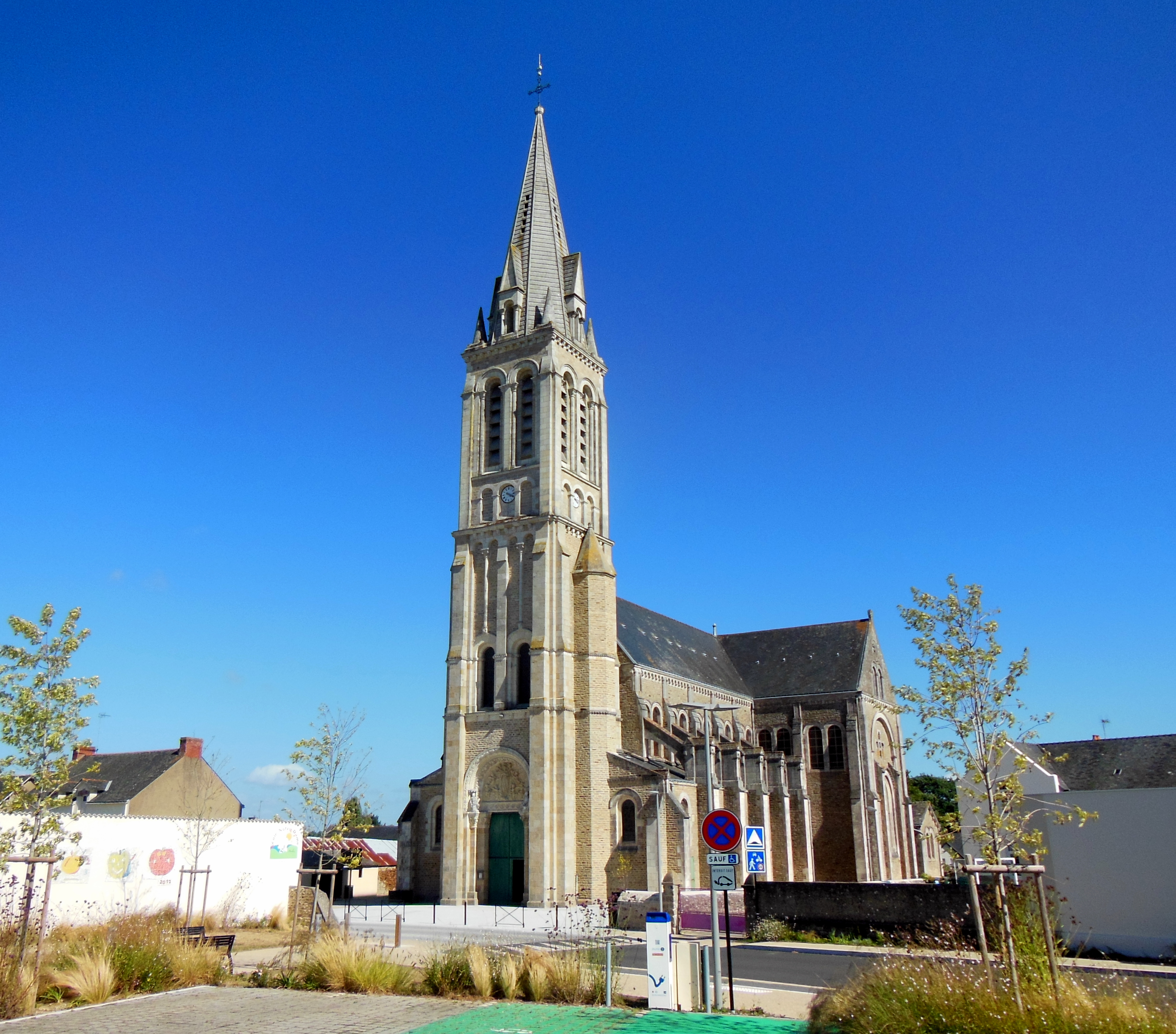
- Notre-Dame-du-Bon-Garant in Férel.

- Coat of arms
- Location of Férel
- Location within France Location within Brittany
- Coordinates: 47°28′59″N 2°20′33″W
- Country: France
- Region: Brittany
- Department: Morbihan
- Arrondissement: Vannes
- Canton: Muzillac
- Intercommunality: CA Presqu'île de Guérande Atlantique

Government
  - Mayor (2026–32): Nicolas Rivalan
- Area^{1}: 28.90 km^{2} (11.16 sq mi)
- Highest elevation: 52 m (171 ft)
- Lowest elevation: 0 m (0 ft)
- Population (2023): 3,499
  - Density: 121.1/km^{2} (313.6/sq mi)
- Time zone: UTC+01:00 (CET)
  - Summer (DST): UTC+02:00 (CEST)
- INSEE/Postal code: 56058 /56130
- ^{1} French Land Register data, which excludes lakes, ponds, glaciers > 1 km^{2} (0.386 sq mi or 247 acres) and river estuaries.

Férel (French pronunciation: [feʁɛl]; Breton: Ferel) is a commune in the Morbihan department of Brittany in north-western France.

== Population ==
Historical population
Year	Pop.	±% p.a.
1968	1,619	—
1975	1,638	+0.17%
1982	1,891	+2.07%
1990	2,027	+0.87%
1999	2,050	+0.13%
2007	2,656	+3.29%
2012	3,088	+3.06%
2017	3,220	+0.84%
2023	3,499	+1.39%
Source: INSEE

Inhabitants of Férel are called in French Férélais.

== See also ==
- La Baule - Guérande Peninsula
- Communes of the Morbihan department
