= List of rulers of Brittany =

This is a list of rulers of Brittany. In different epochs the rulers of Brittany were kings, princes, and dukes. The Breton ruler was sometimes elected, sometimes attained the position by conquest or intrigue, or by hereditary right. Hereditary dukes were sometimes a female ruler, carrying the title duchesse of Brittany. Its principal cities and regions were ruled by counts who often found themselves in conflict with the Breton ruler, or who became the Breton ruler.

During the declining years of the Roman Empire, the earliest Breton rulers in Gaul were styled "kings" of the small realms of Cornouaille and Domnonée. Some such kings may have had a form of hegemony over all of the Brythonic populations in the Armorican peninsula, and Riothamus is called King of the Britons by the chronicler Jordanes. However, there are no certain rulers of the whole of Brittany, which was divided into the fiefdoms of local counts.

The Duchy of Brittany had its origins in the Battle of Trans-la-Forêt of 939, which established the river Couesnon as the boundary between Brittany and Normandy. In 942, Alan II paid homage to Louis IV of France; however, the duchy did not gain royal attention until 1123, when Louis VI of France confirmed the bishop of Nantes. No other Duke of Brittany repeated Alan II's homage until Arthur I recognised Philip II of France as his liege in 1202. In 1297, the peninsula was elevated into a Duchy in the peerage of France. This view is not consistent with the manner in which Charles VIII of France and then Louis XII of France approached the Duchy and the rights of Anne of Brittany who married each in succession.

== Early Breton monarchs ==
- Conan Meriadoc (4th century) – by tradition, the founder of Brittany
- Gradlon the Great (early 5th century)
- Solomon I of Armorica
- Aldroen (5th century)
- Budic I (late 5th century)
- Budic II (early 6th century)
- Waroch I (a "count", unclear if he ruled all of Brittany)
- Waroch II (late 6th century)
- Saint Judicaël (early 7th century)
- Alain II Hir (c. 640?–690)
- Morman (r. 814–818)
- Wihomarc (r. 822–825)

== Dukes of Brittany ==
=== Dukes under the Carolingians ===
- Nominoe (or Nevenoe) (r. 841–851), as a missus dominicus of the Emperor Louis the Pious, a count of Vannes (Gwened) and arguably a duke (dux) of Brittany
- Erispoe (r. 851–857), as a duke, then as a king
- Salomon (or Salaun) (r. 857–874), as a duke, then a king
- Pasquitan (or Paskweten) (r. 874–877), ruling Brittany (southern part) with Gurvand
- Gurvand (r. 874–877), ruling Brittany (northern part) with Pasquitan
- Judicael (r. 877–888), successor of Gurvand, ruled Brittany (north) with Alan the Great (south)
- Alan the Great (reigned from 877 to 888 with Judicaël, alone as a duke, then as a king up to 907)
- Gourmaëlon, Count of Cornouaille (reigned from 907 as a guardian of the kingdom)

The succession was interrupted by the Viking occupation (913–937)

=== House of Nantes ===
Name	Portrait	Birth	Marriage(s)	Death
Alan II the Fox (Alan al Louarn); 938–952		c. before 919 son of Mathuedoi, Count of Poher, and a daughter of Alan I	(1) Roscille of Anjou; 943 (2) ? of Blois bef. 949/51 one son	c. 952; Nantes aged about 33
Drogo (Drogon); 952–958		c. 949/52 only legitimate son of Alan II	never married	c. 958; Angers aged 5–9
Hoël I (Hoel Iañ ) 958–981		? illegitimate son of Alan II and the "noble" Judith	never married	c. 981
Guerech (Guerech Iañ); 981–988		? illegitimate son of Alan II and the "noble" Judith, younger brother of Hoël I	Aremburga of Ancenis after 981 one son	c. 988
Alan (Alan Breizh); 988–990		after 981 son of Guerech and Aremburga of Ancenis	never married	c. 990

=== House of Rennes ===
Name	Portrait	Birth	Marriage(s)	Death
Conan I (Konan Iañ); 990–992		c. 927 eldest son of Judicael Berengar, Count of Rennes and Gerberga	Ermengarde-Gerberga of Anjou; 973 five children	27 June 992; Conquereuil aged 64–65
Geoffrey I (Jafrez Iañ ) 992–1008		c. 980 eldest son of Conan I and Ermengarde-Gerberga of Anjou	Hawise of Normandy; 996 four children	20 November 1008 aged 27–28
Alan III (Alan III); 1008–1040 with Odo I as regent, then co-ruler (1008–1034)		c. 997 eldest son of Geoffrey I and Hawise of Normandy	Bertha of Blois; 1018 two children	1 October 1040; Montgommery aged 42–43
Odo I (Eozen I); 1008–1034 as regent, then co-ruler to Alan III		c. 999 second son of Geoffrey I and Hawise of Normandy	Orguen of Cornouaille six children	c. 1079; Cesson aged 79–80
Conan II (Konan II); 1040–1066 with Odo I as regent (1040–1057)		c. 1033 only son of Alan III and Bertha of Blois	never married	11 December 1066; Château-Gontier aged 32–33
Hawise (Hawiz); 1066–1072 with Hoël II		c. 1037 only daughter of Alan III and Bertha of Blois	1066 seven children	19 August 1072 aged 34–35
Hoël II (Hoël II); 1066–1072 with Hawise		c. 1031 eldest son of Alain Canhiart, Count of Cornouaille and Judith of Nantes, descendant of Alan II	1066 seven children	13 April 1084 aged 52–53

=== House of Cornouaille ===
Name	Portrait	Birth	Marriage(s)	Death
Alan IV the Younger (Alan IV Fergant ) 1072–1112 with Hoël II as regent (1072–1084)		bef. 1060 eldest son of Hoël II and Hawise	(1) Constance of Normandy; 1086/88 no issue (2) Ermengarde of Anjou; 1093 three children	13 October 1119; Redon Abbey aged 60s
Conan III the Fat (Konan III); 1112–1148		c. 1093–1096 eldest son of Alan IV and Ermengarde of Anjou	Maud FitzRoy; 1112 three children	17 September 1148 aged 54–58
Bertha (Berta); 1148–1156 with Odo II		c. 1114 eldest daughter of Conan III and Maud FitzRoy	(1) Alan, 1st Earl of Richmond; 1137/8 three children (2) Odo II; 1148 three children	c. 1156 aged 41–43
Odo II (Eozen II); 1148–1156 with Bertha		? eldest son of Geoffrey, Viscount of Porhoet and Hawise	(1) Bertha; 1148 three children (2) Joan-Eleanor of Léon; August 1167 two or three children	c. 1170

=== House of Penthièvre ===
Name	Portrait	Birth	Marriage(s)	Death
Conan IV the Black (Konan IV); 1156–1166		c. 1138 only son of Alan of Penthièvre, 1st Earl of Richmond and Bertha	Margaret of Huntingdon; 1160 one daughter	20 February 1171 aged 33
Constance (Konstanza); 1166–1201 with Geoffrey II (1181–1186) with Arthur I (1196–1201) with Guy (1199–1201)		c. 1161 daughter of Conan IV and Margaret of Huntingdon	(1) Geoffrey II; July 1181 three children (2) Ranulf; 3 February 1188 no issue (3) Guy of Thouars; October 1199 two or three daughters	5 September 1201; Nantes aged 40
Geoffrey II (Jafrez II); 1181–1186 with Constance		23 September 1158 fourth son of Henry II of England and Eleanor of Aquitaine	Constance; July 1181 three children	19 August 1186; Paris, France aged 27
Guy (Gi); 1199–1201; 1203–1213 with Constance (1199–1201) with Alix (1203–1213)		birth date unknown second son of Aimery IV of Thouars and Aénor of Lusignan	(1) Constance; October 1199 two or three daughters (2) Eustachie of Chemillé; 1203 two sons	13 April 1213; Chemillé, France

=== House of Plantagenet ===
Name	Portrait	Birth	Marriage(s)	Death
Arthur I (Arzhur Iañ); 1196–1203 with Constance (1196–1201)		29 March 1187 in Nantes, only son of Geoffrey II and Constance	never married	Disappeared in captivity aged 16; fate unknown

Eleanor, Fair Maid of Brittany, eldest daughter of Geoffrey and Constance and full elder sister of Arthur, also unmarried, was prevented from succession by her imprisonment in England which lasted till her death in 1241, thus was merely a titular duchess from 1208 to 1214 when John, King of England ceased to support her claim.

=== House of Thouars ===
Name	Portrait	Birth	Marriage(s)	Death
Alix (Alis); 1203–1221 with Guy as regent (1203–1213) with Peter I (1213–1221)		1200 eldest daughter of Guy and Constance	Peter I 1213 three children	21 October 1221 aged 21
Peter I Mauclerc (Pêr Iañ); 1213–1221 with Alix		c. 1190 second son of Robert II of Dreux and Yolanda de Coucy	(1) Alix; 1213 three children (2) Nicole c. 1230 one son (3) Marguerite de Commequiers bef. January 1236 no issue	6 July 1250 sea off Damietta aged 59–60

=== House of Dreux ===
Name	Portrait	Birth	Marriage(s)	Death
John I the Red (Yann Iañ ar Ruz); 1221–1286 with Peter I as regent (1221–1237)		c. 1217/18 eldest son of Peter I and Alix	Blanche of Navarre; Château-Thierry, Aisne; 16 January 1236 eight children	8 October 1286; Château de l'Isle, Férel, Morbihan aged 67–69
John II (Yann II); 1286–1305		3/4 January 1239 eldest son of John I and Blanche of Navarre	Beatrice of England; Westminster Abbey, London; 25 December 1260 eight children	16 November 1305; Lyon aged 66
Arthur II (Arzhur II); 1305–1312		2 July 1262 eldest son of John II and Beatrice of England	(1) Marie of Limoges; Tours; 1277 three children (2) Yolande of Dreux; May 1292 six children	27 August 1312; Château de l'Isle, Férel, Morbihan aged 50
John III the Good (Yann III); 1312–1341		8 March 1286; Château de Champtoceaux, Maine-et-Loire eldest son of Arthur II and Marie of Limoges	(1) Isabella of Valois; 18 February 1298 no issue (2) Isabella of Castile and León; Burgos; 21 June 1310 no issue (3) Joan of Savoy; Chartres; 21 March 1330 no issue	30 April 1341; Caen aged 55

=== Breton War of Succession ===
Name	Portrait	Birth	Marriage(s)	Death
Joan the Lame (Janed); 1341–1364 with Charles I		c. 1319 only daughter of Guy of Brittany, Count of Penthièvre and Joan of Avaugour	Paris; 4 June 1337 five children	10 September 1384; Guingamp aged 64–65
Charles I (Charlez Iañ); 1341–1364 with Joan		c. 1319; Blois second son of Guy I, Count of Blois and Margaret of Valois	Paris; 4 June 1337 five children	29 September 1364; Auray aged 44–45
John (IV) of Montfort (Yann IV Moñforzh); May 1341–1345		c. 1293 only son of Arthur II and Yolande de Dreux	Joanna of Flanders; Chartres; March 1329 two children	26 September 1345; Château d'Hennebon, Hennebont aged 51–52
John (V) of Montfort (Yann V Moñforzh); 1345–1364		c. 1339 only son of John of Montfort and Joanna of Flanders	(1) Mary Plantagenet of England; Woodstock Palace, Woodstock, Oxfordshire summer of 1361 no issue (2) Joan Holland; London; May 1366 no issue (3) Joan of Navarre; Saillé-près-Guérande; 2 October 1386 nine children	1/2 November 1399; Nantes aged 59–60

=== House of Montfort ===
Name	Portrait	Birth	Marriage(s)	Death
John IV the Conqueror (Yann IV); 1364–1399 (Previously John V in pretentious succession from his father.)		c. 1339 only son of John of Montfort and Joanna of Flanders	(1) Mary Plantagenet of England; Woodstock Palace, Woodstock, Oxfordshire summer of 1361 no issue (2) Joan Holland; London; May 1366 no issue (3) Joan of Navarre; Saillé-près-Guérande; 2 October 1386 nine children	1/2 November 1399; Nantes aged 59–60
John V the Wise (Yann V ar Fur); 1399–1442		24 December 1389; Château de l'Hermine, Vannes, Morbihan eldest son of John IV and Joan of Navarre	Joan of France; Hôtel de Saint-Pol, Paris; 19 September 1396 seven children	29 August 1442; Manoir de La Touche, Nantes aged 52
Francis I the Well-Loved (Frañsez Iañ); 1442–1450		11 May 1414; Vannes eldest son of John V and Joan of France	(1) Yolande of Anjou; Amboise; 20 August 1431 one son (2) Isabella of Scotland; Château d'Auray; 30 October 1442 two daughter	17 July 1450; Château de l'Hermine, Vannes, Morbihan aged 36
Peter II the Simple (Pêr II); 1450–1457		7 July 1418; Nantes second son of John V and Joan of France	Françoise d'Amboise c. 1442 no issue	22 September 1457; Nantes aged 39
Arthur III the Justicier (Arzhur III); 1457–1458		24 August 1393; Château de Suscinio, Vannes second son of John IV and Joan of Navarre	(1) Margaret of Burgundy; Dijon; 10 October 1423 no issue (2) Joan of Albret; Nérac; 29 August 1442 no issue (3) Catherine of Luxembourg; 2 July 1445 no issue	26 December 1458; Nantes aged 65
Francis II (Frañsez II); 1458–1488		23 June 1433; Château de Clisson eldest son of Richard de Dreux, Count of Étampes and Marguerite d'Orléans, Countess of Vertus	(1) Marguerite of Brittany; Château de l'Hermine; 16 November 1455 one son (2) Marguerite of Foix; Château de Clisson; 27 June 1474 two daughters	9 September 1488; Couëron aged 55
Anne (Anna); 1488–1514		25 January 1477; Château de Nantes eldest daughter of Francis II and Margaret of Foix	(1) Maximilian I, Holy Roman Emperor (by proxy) Rennes Cathedral; 19 December 1490 no issue (2) Charles VIII of France; Château de Langeais; 19 December 1491 four children (3) Louis XII of France; Château de Nantes; 8 January 1499 four children	9 January 1514; Château de Blois aged 36

=== House of Valois ===
Name	Portrait	Birth	Marriage(s)	Death
Claude (Klaoda); 1514–1524 with Francis (1514–1515)		14 October 1499; Romorantin-Lanthenay eldest daughter of Louis XII of France and Anne	Francis I of France; Château de Saint-Germain-en-Laye; 18 May 1514 eight children	20 July 1524; Château de Blois aged 24
Francis (Frañsez); 1514–1515 with Claude (1514–1515)		12 September 1494; Château de Cognac only son of Charles de Valois, Count of Angoulême and Louise of Savoy	(1) Claude; Château de Saint-Germain-en-Laye; 18 May 1514 eight children (2) Eleanor of Austria; Abbaye de Veien; 7 August 1530 no issue	31 March 1547; Château de Rambouillet aged 52
Francis III (Frañsez III); 1524–1536		28 February 1518; Château d'Amboise eldest son of Francis I of France and Claude	never married	10 August 1536; Château de Tournon aged 18
Henry (Herri); 1536–1547		31 March 1519; Château de Saint-Germain-en-Laye second son of Francis I of France and Claude	Catherine de' Medici; Marseille Cathedral; 28 October 1533 ten children	10 July 1559; Place des Vosges aged 40

== As courtesy title ==
Name	Portrait	Birth	Marriage(s)	Death
Louis de France; 1704–1705		25 June 1704; Palace of Versailles eldest son of Louis, Duke of Burgundy and Marie-Adélaïde of Savoy	never married	13 April 1705; Palace of Versailles died before first birthday
Louis de France; 1707–1712		8 January 1707; Palace of Versailles second son of Louis, Duke of Burgundy and Marie Adélaïde of Savoy	never married	18 February 1712; Palace of Versailles aged 5
François de Bourbon; 1973–1984		22 November 1972; Madrid eldest son of Alfonso, Duke of Anjou and Cádiz and María del Carmen Martínez-Bordiú y Franco	never married	7 February 1984; Pamplona aged 11

== Family tree ==
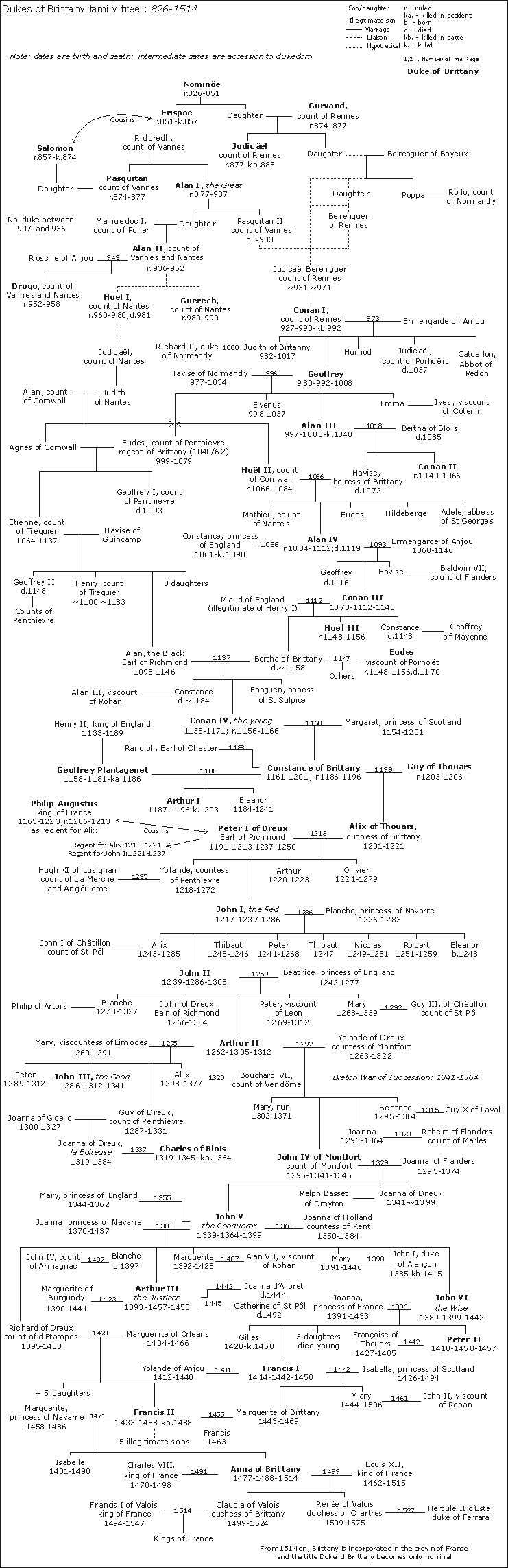

== See also ==
- Brittany
- Château des ducs de Bretagne (Castle of the Dukes of Brittany)
- Duchy of Brittany
- List of Breton royal consorts
- Union of the Duchy of Brittany with the Crown of France
