= Alan IV, Viscount of Rohan =

Alan IV of Rohan
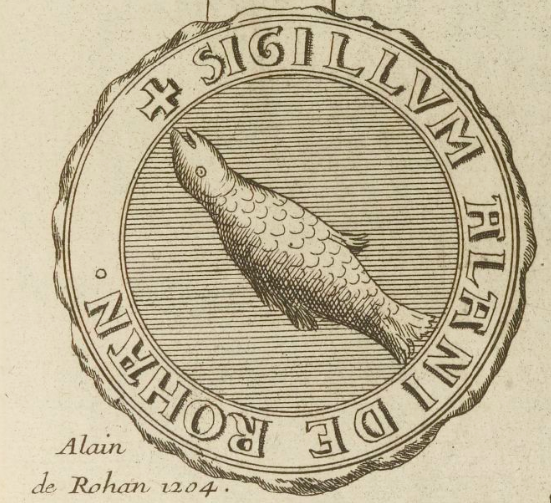
- Born: c. 1166
- Died: 1205
- Noble family: House of Rohan
- Spouse: Mabilla of Fougères
- Father: Alan III
- Mother: Constance of Penthièvre

Alan IV de Rohan, called the Young (c. 1166 – 1205), was the eldest son of Alan III, Viscount of Rohan and Constance of Penthièvre. He was 4th Viscount of Rohan and Lord of Corlay. He took part to the Third Crusade.

== Life ==
Alan married Mabilla of Fougères, a daughter of Raoul II, Baron of Fougères, Grand Seneschal of Brittany, Crusader, and Joan of Dol. She died before 1198.

They had six children:

- Geoffrey, 5th Viscount of Rohan, died without issue
- Alix of Rohan
- Catherine of Rohan
- Conan of Rohan (1190 - 1220)
- Oliver I, 6th Viscount of Rohan, died without issue
- Alan V, 7th Viscount of Rohan

== Coat of arms ==
Former arms of the House of Rohan: Gules seven mascles or 3, 3, 1

== See also ==
- House of Rohan
- Viscounty of Rohan

== Sources ==
- Morvan, Frederic (2009). La Chevalerie bretonne et la formation de l'armee ducale (in French). Presses Universitaires de Rennes.

Alan IV, Viscount of Rohan House of Rohan Born: 1166
Regnal titles
| Preceded by Alan III | Viscount of Rohan; 1195–1205 | Succeeded by Geoffrey I |
