= Earl of Richmond =

Title in the Peerage of England

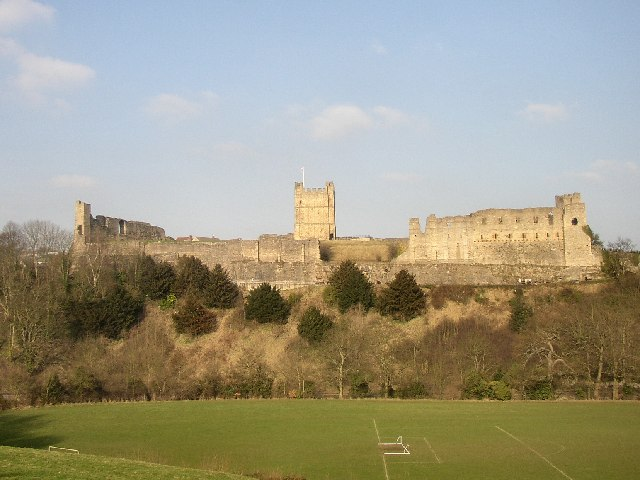
Richmond Castle first built by Alan Rufus

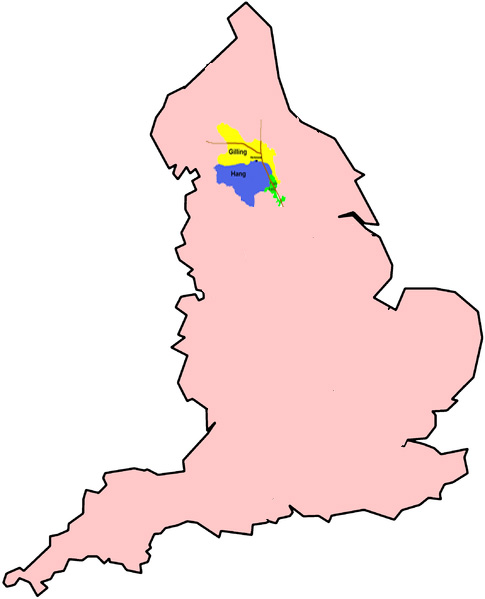
The Honour of Richmond in North Yorkshire, England

The now-extinct title of Earl of Richmond was created many times in the Peerage of England. The earldom of Richmond was initially held by various Breton nobles; sometimes the holder was the Breton duke himself, including one member of the cadet branch of the French Capetian dynasty. The historical ties between the Duchy of Brittany and this English earldom were maintained ceremonially by the Breton dukes even after England ceased to recognize the Breton dukes as earls of England and those dukes rendered homage to the King of France, rather than the English crown. It was then held either by members of the English royal families of Plantagenet and Tudor, or English nobles closely associated with the English crown. It was eventually merged into the English crown during the reign of Henry VII of England and has been recreated as a dukedom.

== History ==
The title Earl of Richmond is associated with the now extinct earldom, the earlier lords of Richmond who held the Honour of Richmond, one of the most important fiefs in England, and eventually the dukes of Richmond. The title of earl predates the French-Breton-Norman title of count (comte), but the two became interchangeable in the time of William the Conqueror.

From their first creation, the lords and earls of Richmond were leading members of the ruling class of post-Conquest England, as defined by Keats-Rohan as "[those holding fiefs, (the right to collect fees)] held in some relationship in the feudal chain from the king of England, whether the holder be Norman, Breton, Manceau, Poitevin, Fleming or Anglo-Saxon." (Note: These various groups, according to Keats-Rohan, constituted the principal groups within his Conquest forces. The actual array of groups is more diverse, notes Keats-Rohan, than the general label "Norman" might imply.) In William I's Conquest of England in fact "the regional origin of [the Conquerors] ...was not exclusively Norman, ... and the size of the Breton contingent ... is generally agreed to be the most significant." Until the late 12th century, all the earls of Richmond were Breton noblemen.

The Earldom of Richmond was frequently associated with the accumulation of great wealth within England.

The earl was frequently known in the courts of the kings of France and the dukes of Brittany as comte de Richemont (Note: Or comte de Richmond or, for a female suo jure holder of the title, such as Anne of Brittany, comtesse de Richemont) or other spelling variations, where in the courts of England and Brittany, French was frequently used.

=== The lords of Richmond ===
The Honour of Richmond preceded the Earldom of Richmond. The Honour conveyed, among other things, economic rights to the holder. The Honour of Richmond was reputed to be among the wealthiest in England. It appears to have been in existence in England from 1071 shortly after the Harrying of the North, a military campaign which followed the Battle of Hastings (1066). This was before the title Earl of Richmond was held in accordance with any strict legal principle. It was initially awarded to Breton nobles from the ducal family of Brittany by the king of England. It represented, among other things, the close association of England and Brittany.

Early holders of the honour of Richmond were sometimes known as lords of Richmond rather than as earls. The Honour of Richmond and the title Earl of Richmond, were held principally by Breton nobles, and often by the duke of Brittany, except for two periods from 1241 to 1268 and from 1286 to 1372. In 1435 the title was granted to the House of Plantagenet, before the Duchy of Brittany was permanently annexed to the crown of France. The title was definitively returned to crown during the reign of the Tudor kings. It was first granted to Alan Rufus in 1071 by William the Conqueror. (Note: According to Butler, Rufus was a count, and the honour represented an assessment of 60 knights. According to Keats-Rohan, the Honour was likely awarded after the Harrying of the North.) The honour, which was assessed for the service of 60 knights, was one of the most important fiefs in Norman England. (Note: The honour of Richmond would sometimes be separated from the earldom, but only for brief periods of time.) (Note: In 1399, the new King Henry IV of England granted Ralph de Neville, 1st Earl of Westmorland a lifetime grant of the honour of Richmond, among other honors and wardships as a reward for his support. This grant to Ralph de Neville was not accompanied by a grant of the title Earl of Richmond.)

=== Earls of Richmond ===
The 1st Earl of Richmond was the Breton warrior Alan Rufus (c. 1040–1093). He was related to both the duke of Normandy and the duke of Brittany. He was a grandson of Duke Geoffrey I of Brittany and Hawise of Normandy and the second son of Odo, Count of Penthièvre. He most probably took part in William the Conqueror's invasion of England, after which he obtained grants of land in various parts of England, including manors formerly held by Earl Edwin in Yorkshire. Alan Rufus would be the first of as many as four brothers to constitute the Breton Richmond-Penthievre family in England. He built the Richmond Castle in Richmond. As he was William the Conqueror's double second cousin, Keats-Rohan would describe him a member of the English nobility, that is the holder of a fief who are also a member of a kin-group, albeit a member of the Breton contingents within William's conquering army. The Bretons within William's army were composed of three groups, and at one time one of those contingents, led by Ralph de Gael revolted; as Lord of Richmond, Alan's lands would be expanded by some of those forfeited by Ralph. This is taken by historians as symbolic of the loyalty that Alan Rufus displayed to William, and from this time Richmond would remain in the hands of the most loyal of English kings' nobles and also represent a means for the King to allocate wealth to his closest "kin-group" in the sense defined by Keats-Rohan. Alan Rufus emerged as the wealthiest and most important of the Breton nobles around William I, was a key supporter of William II in the events preceding, during and following the Rebellion of 1088 and may have participated in the invasion of Normandy in 1091.

Alan Rufus died on 4 August 1093 due to an unknown cause. His succession settled quickly upon his younger brother, another Alan, nicknamed "Niger" (The Black), who seems to have died by 1098. Stephen, their younger brother, inherited Richmond. Stephen died between 1135 and 1138, and was succeeded in Brittany by his eldest son, Geoffrey Boterel II, a supporter of the Empress Matilda, and in England by a younger son, Alan, also nicknamed The Black, (Note: This soubriquet is disputed.) who was an ally of King Stephen during The Anarchy.

The Penthièvre brothers who held the territorial designation as Lords of Richmond are often reckoned as de facto 'earls of Richmond', though they were not so in the later strictly legal sense. Through the reign of King Henry I few earldoms had been created. King Stephen's reign was marked by the creation of several new earldoms.

Coat of Arms of John of Brittany, Earl of Richmond (Jean de Bretagne)

Coat of arms of Edmund Tudor, Earl of Richmond

Stephen of Tréguier's son Alan (c. 1116–1146), was the first of these lords to be styled "Earl of Richmond" in a strictly legal sense. King Stephen also created Alan 1st Earl of Cornwall although this title would be forfeit in 1141 after the Battle of Lincoln. Alan of Brittany is recorded as riding at King Stephen's side in the Battle of Lincoln. Alan Rufus, Stephen of Tréguier, and Alan were members of "the Richmond-Penthievre... [family, and this family]... maintained its rivalry with its ducal cousins [in Brittany] into the next century". (Note: It would be the Penthievre line of Breton nobility who would finally attempt to claim the ducal crown of Brittany. This disputed claim would lead to the Breton War of Succession, a contest with the House of Montfort that would include the loss of the rights and properties associated with the Earldom of Richmond by the Montfortists. (See John of Montfort in the list of Earls of Richmond.) After the House of Penthievre was precluded by the Treaty of Guerande from the ducal crown, they would continue their rivalry with their ducal cousins until their rights were seized and their title and properties were merged into the Duchy.)

Alan married Bertha, daughter and heiress of Duke Conan III of Brittany. Alan died in 1146 at which time his widow returned to Brittany. Their son, Duke Conan IV of Brittany (c. 1138–1171) married Margaret of Huntingdon, sister of King Malcolm IV of Scotland. Conan asserted his right to Brittany, and with it Richmond; he transferred the title Earl of Richmond during his lifetime to his daughter Constance (c. 1161–1201).

Constance married three times, and each of her husbands in turn assumed the title of earl of Richmond jure uxeris, in conjunction with that of Duke of Brittany (also jure uxeris). They were: Geoffrey Plantagenet (1158–1186), son of Henry II of England; Ranulph de Blondeville, Earl of Chester (c. 1172–1232); (Note: Constance treated this marriage as null on the ground of consanguinity.) and Guy de Thouars (d. 1213), who survived his wife for twelve years. The only son of the first marriage, Arthur (1187–1203), was styled Earl of Richmond in his mother's lifetime. On his likely murder at the hands of his uncle, King John (John Lackland [English] or Jean sans Terres [French]), the earldom's possession was disputed. Arthur's legal heir, his full elder sister, Eleanor, is sometimes considered to have succeeded him as Countess of Richmond in 1208, but due to her claims to England, Brittany, Anjou and Aquitaine, King John kept her imprisoned from 1202 and gave her no lands of the earldom.

To complicate matters, Constance of Brittany had two daughters by her third marriage, the elder of whom, Alix, was proclaimed Duchess of Brittany by the Breton lords and given in marriage to Peter Mauclerc by King Philip II of France, in 1213. Alix used the title Countess of Richmond from 1203 to her death in 1221. As a result of his marriage to Alix, Pierre was styled Duke of Brittany and Earl of Richmond, but the latter title was only officially proclaimed in 1218, during the reign of Henry III, while Eleanor was apparently deprived of her last title. Peter Mauclerc was the founder of the Breton House of Dreux. The title would continue in the House of Dreux for some time, although from time to time, it was forfeited, or it reverted to the crown. About 1235 Peter Mauclerc renounced his allegiance to England, and consequently suffered forfeiture of his English estates. Despite some better treatments including the grant of the Swaffham manor, the title and other lands of the earldom were however not restored to Eleanor, who remained confined until her death in 1241; William of Savoy was granted Honour of Richmond in 1236.

In 1241 Henry III granted the estates of Richmond to Peter of Savoy (1203–1268), uncle of his queen consort, Eleanor of Provence. Peter was thereafter described as Earl of Richmond by contemporary chroniclers. By his will, Savoy left Richmond to his niece, Eleanor, who transferred it to the crown. That year, 1268, Henry III granted the earldom to John I, Duke of Brittany (1217–1286), son of Pierre Mauclerc. The title was recreated for John I's heir, John II, Duke of Brittany. In 1306 the title was granted to his son John of Brittany who entered into the service of Edward I and Edward II of England. As an earl, John of Brittany was particularly inattentive to English politics. He had a distinguished record as a diplomat working on behalf of these Kings of England and was a frequent warrior in their military quests, both on the continent and in Britain. Upon John of Brittany's death, the title passed to his nephew, John III, Duke of Brittany.

The earldom was then passed to John of Montfort, John III's half-brother. John III had no issue and upon his death the inheritance of the Duchy of Brittany became disputed. John III's niece Joan of Penthievre claimed the duchy without apparently claiming to be hereditary countess of Richmond. John III's half-brother, John of Montfort, disputed Joan's claim to the duchy and their dispute was initially adjudicated by the French king in a court of peers in Conflans, France. In that adjudication, Charles of Blois, Joanna's husband, gained recognition as Duke of Brittany and John of Montfort fled. The Breton War of Succession ensued. The French king's adjudication raised the question of whether the Duke of Brittany and separately the Earl of Richmond, whether one and the same or not, owed homage to the French king as vassal. John of Montfort fled Conflans in order to regain his troops who occupied many fortified castles in a line from Nantes to Brittany. The French king raised an army to defend the interests of Charles of Blois and seized the county of Montfort from John of Montfort. The king then proposed to Jean de Montfort that he would permit him to retain the Earldom of Richmond if John accepted the adjudication of Conflans and returned to the French court as a loyal vassal. (Note: In a French translation of a report of the incidents reported in latin: The French king, in addressing John of Montfort added that en indemnité de la perte de Montfort, il concède ... le comté de Richemont, avec cette condition pourtant que, si le comte recouvrait Montfort, il rendrait Richemont, sauf, dit l'acte, une nouvelle et plus grande faveur, qu'en raison de la continuation et de l'augmentation de ses bons services envers nous, le comte peut espérer de l'excès de la munificence royale See the writings of Dom Morice, Pr I, 1424) Edward III reacted by supporting Jean de Montfort.

In 1342, the title reverted to Edward III and would remain for a time behind the "shield of England" as the competing claims of the French and English crowns were played out, first in the Breton War of Succession and then across the Hundred Years' War. Edward III granted the Earldom to his son John of Gaunt, who then surrendered it in 1372. The earldom was then given to Duke John V of Brittany, but on his death or possibly at an earlier date through forfeiture, it reverted to the crown and was to remain behind the "shield of England" and away from any attempts of the French crown to acquire it and the related properties. (Note: The earldom was now used as a titulary both succeeding dukes of Brittany until the duchy was permanently merged into the French crown; the actual earldom and its related honour would subsequently be held by English appointees before it was merged into the English crown.)

From 1414 to 1435 the earldom of Richmond was held by John Plantagenet, Duke of Bedford. In 1453 it was conferred on Edmund Tudor, half-brother to King Henry VI. When Edmund's son Henry ascended the throne as Henry VII in 1485, the earldom of Richmond merged in the crown, and for the next forty years there was no further grant of the title. (Note: George Plantagenet, 1st Duke of Clarence was also understood to be Earl of Richmond, among his other titles. This is under review for this article.) (Note: An associated office was that of Richmond Herald. From 1421 to 1485 the Richmond Herald served John, Duke of Bedford, George, Duke of Clarence, and Henry, Earl of Richmond, all of whom held the Honour (estate) of Richmond.) After Henry Tudor, Earl of Richmond, became King Henry VII of England, the title Duke of Richmond was created by the Tudor Dynasty, and over time generally overtook the use of the title Earl of Richmond. The earldom has not been recreated since.

=== Titular Earls ===
There was a close association with the Duchy of Brittany from the inception of the honours and titles associated with Richmond until the reign of John V. After John V, the English crown ceased to recognize the Breton rulers as Earls of Richmond and the crown frequently assigned the Honour of Richmond to English nobles. In Brittany, the Dukes who succeeded John V continued to use the title Earl of Richmond, or in French, Comte de Richemont. Francis II was the last Duke of Brittany associated with the courtesy title. He waived all rights to holdings in England and assigned them to Henry Tudor, in advance of Henry's armed invasion of England. After Henry's attainment of the English throne, the Earl of Richmond and the Honour of Richmond were merged with the English crown.

=== The Tudor Dynasty ===
Edmund Tudor had been educated by Catherine de la Pole, the Abbess of Barking, who brought him to Henry VI's attention. Upon attaining adulthood, Edmund joined Henry VI at court. In 1449 Henry VI knighted him and then circa 1452 summoned Edmund to parliament as the Earl of Richmond. He had one son, Henry VII, who was born posthumously circa 1456.

=== Subsequent Dukes of Richmond ===
The Earldom of Richmond was replaced by the Dukedom of Richmond which was named after Richmond and its surrounding district of Richmondshire. It has been held by members of the royal Tudor and Stuart families. The current dukedom of Richmond initially maintained the historic ties of Richmond to Brittany when it was created in 1675 for Charles Lennox: he was the illegitimate son of King Charles II of England and a noble bretonne, Louise de Penancoët de Kérouaille. (Note: In Brittany family names are often descriptive of a role in life or the place of birth or one's holdings as a local Lord. The Breton the maiden name of Charles Lennox's mother is descriptive in this sense. "Ker" means place or farm or city and so Kerouaille is meant to designate a region of Brittany near Brest tied to her family. "Pen" means highest, and "Coet" means woods or forests, with "an" usually meaning "the"; thus Penancoët loosely translates to "chief of the woods.")

== List of the Lords and Earls of Richmond ==
=== Earls of Richmond (early Lords of Richmond) ===
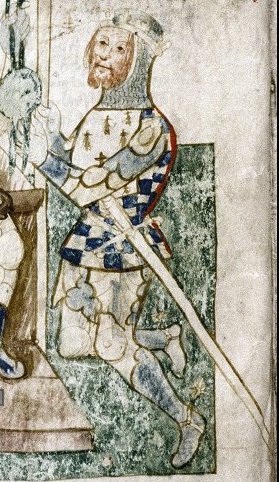
Alan Rufus, first Earl of Richmond

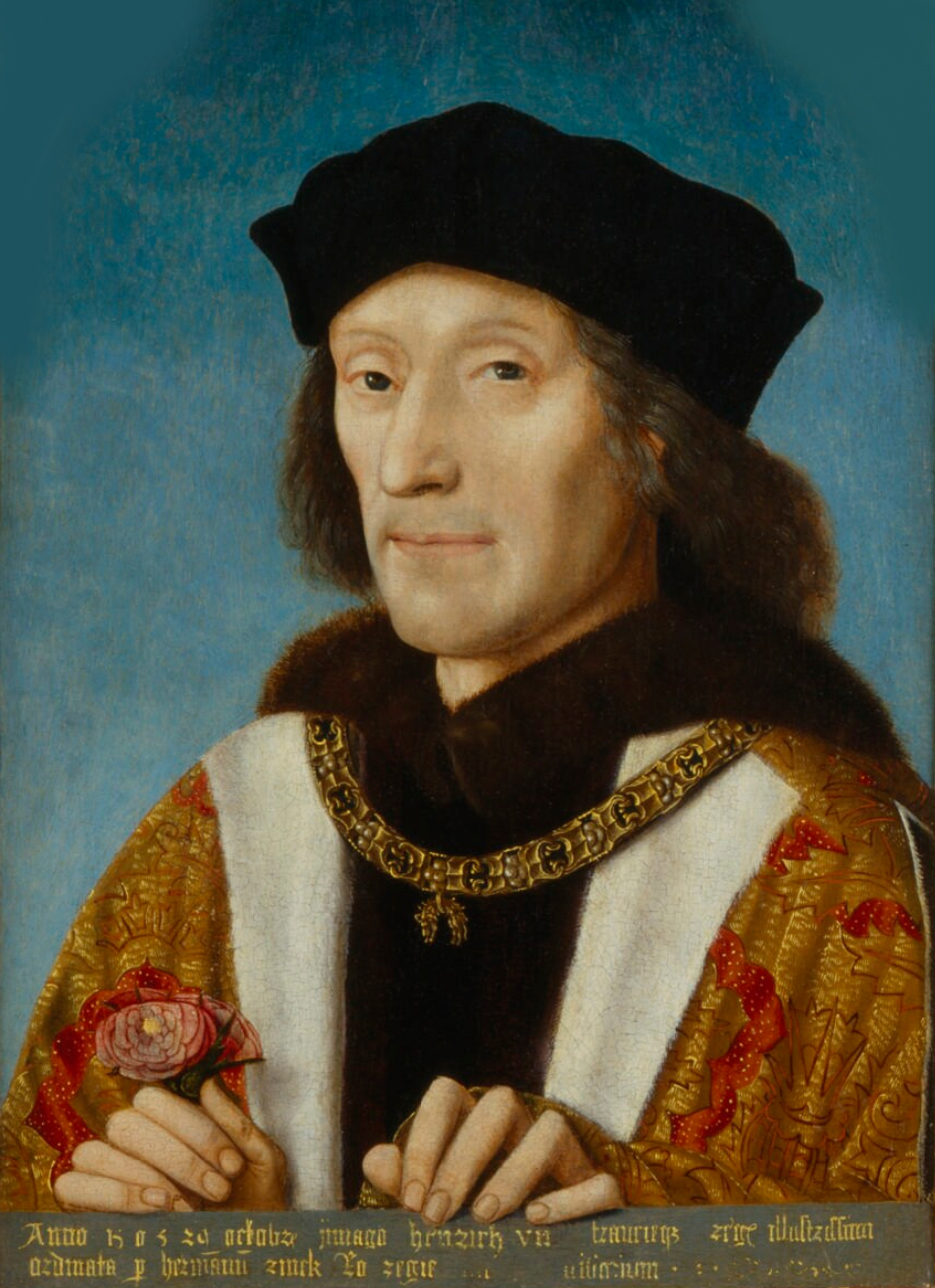
Henry Tudor (Henry VII), last Earl of Richmond

The heraldic badge of Richmond Herald of Arms in Ordinary held by the herald to Henry Tudor, Earl of Richmond

- Alan Rufus (c. 1040–1093) – built Richmond Castle, ally of William the Conqueror
- Alan the Black (d. 1098)
- Stephen, Count of Tréguier (1058/1062–1136) – the younger brother of Alan Rufus

=== Earls of Richmond, 1st Creation (1136) ===
- Alan the Black, 1st Earl of Richmond (d. 1146) – third son of Stephen of Treguier; husband of Bertha, Duchess of Brittany, daughter of Conan III. Alan died before she became Duchess.
- Conan IV, Duke of Brittany (d. 1171) – son of Alan the Black and Bertha of Brittany; the first Duke of Brittany to hold the title directly; the Earldom was seized in 1158 by Henry II of England after Conan seized the County of Nantes and it was returned to Conan when the latter returned the County of Nantes to Henry II. The latter acted as a regent when Conan abdicated in favour of his daughter Constance of Brittany and would later confer the title on his son Geoffrey in connection with his marriage to Constance.
- Constance, Duchess of Brittany (1183–1201). (Note: Although she was heiress of the Earldom of Richmond at her father's death in 1171, Constance did not enter her inheritance until 1183/1184.)
- Geoffrey II, Duke of Brittany – Earl of Richmond jure uxoris (1183 (Note: "From Michaelmas 1183, Geoffrey was also in possession of the honour of Richmond.")-1186).
- Ranulf de Blondeville, 6th Earl of Chester – Earl of Richmond jure uxoris (1189–1198). (Note: Although he married Constance, Ranulph never ruled as Duke of Brittany and Earl of Richmond.)
- Guy of Thouars – Earl of Richmond jure uxoris (1199–1201).
- Arthur I, Duke of Brittany (1196–1203) – son of Geoffrey and Constance; succeeded his mother in her lifetime. Imprisoned by his uncle King John of England (Jean sans Terres) since 1202, disappeared in 1203 and viewed as having died in 1208. The circumstances of Arthur's death were a factor in the rebellions that culminated in French royal intervention and King John's consequent loss of the continental empire that had been assiduously constructed by his father King Henry II.
  - Eleanor, Fair Maid of Brittany – Titular Hereditary Countess of Richmond. She was Constance's daughter and Arthur's sister. She was considered by some to have succeeded to the Earldom as the 5th Countess of Richmond. Imprisoned initially by King John of England (Jean sans Terres) and then his successor King Henry III. John gave her no lands of the earldom. She died 1241 after a lifetime of imprisonment since 1202. During her life imprisonment, John I had offered the Earldom to Peter Mauclerc, who declined the offer but was still recognized as Earl of Richmond in 1218 under William Marshal regent of Henry III, by which time Eleanor ceased to be styled as countess. Meanwhile, Henry III had a law passed in England that prevented Eleanor from any English inheritances to the crown. She never regained Richmond even after Peter later forfeited it in 1235.
- Alix, Duchess of Brittany (1203–1221) – daughter of Constance and Guy of Thouars. She succeeded her half-brother. Although her half-sister Eleanor used the title Countess of Richmond in the same time, Alix made charters about this estate and used the title from 1203 to her death in 1221.
- Peter I, Duke of Brittany (1213–1218) – Earl of Richmond jure uxoris. Alix was Countess of Richmond from 1203 to 1221.

=== Earls of Richmond, 2nd Creation (1218) ===
- Peter I of Brittany (1190–1250), forfeit 1235 – the husband of Alix of Thouars, the heiress of Constance of Brittany; Peter also ruled as Duke of Brittany jure uxoris, and later as regent of Brittany. He was a member of the House of Dreux and was known at various times in his life as Pierre de Dreux, Pierre Mauclerc (Note: Mauclerc is meant to be understood as "bad clerk" from the older French version of mauvais clerc.) and Pierre de Braine (Note: A name for Peter that became popular after his service as regent came to an end.). King John offered him the earldom in his own right, but Peter declined because of his links to the King of France. However, in 1218 he was still recognized as Earl of Richmond by William Marshal regent of John I's son, Henry III. He forfeited any rights to the Earldom during the reign of Henry III.

=== Earls of Richmond, 3rd Creation (1241) ===
- Peter II, Count of Savoy (1203–1268) – in 1240 was granted the Honour of Richmond by Henry III, but he never assumed the title of Earl; under his will, he left the Honour of Richmond to his niece the queen, Eleanor of Provence, who transferred it to the crown.

=== Earls of Richmond, 2nd Creation (restored 1268) ===
- John I, Duke of Brittany (1217–1286), restored to the Earldom by Henry III; resigned peerage in 1268 to his son, John of Dreux, the future Duke John II, upon John's marriage to Beatrice, Henry III's daughter
- John of Dreux, Earl of Richmond (1239–1305) – eventually, Duke John II of Brittany; married to Henry III's daughter Beatrice; this marriage was meant to bring the Earl of Richmond under the "shield of England" during the reign of Henry III, when tensions rose with France; John of Dreux only became Duke of Brittany after Beatrice's death, so Beatrice never became Duchess of Brittany.
- John of Brittany, Earl of Richmond (1266–1334) – received his title from his father John II, Duke of Brittany in 1306 and entered into Edward I's service; lost his lands in 1325 for a time when he allied himself with Queen Isabella to force the abdication of her husband Edward II in favour of her son Edward III; his lands were restored by Edward III.
- John III, Duke of Brittany (1286–1341) – received this title in 1334 upon John of Brittany's death after he had inherited the Duchy of Brittany in 1312 upon the death of Arthur II, Duke of Brittany; he was John of Brittany's nephew and the eldest son of Arthur II and a grandson of John II.

=== Earls of Richmond, 4th Creation (1341) ===
- Robert of Artois (1287–1342), received the earldom as a reward for service and loyalty to Edward III of England during the first four years of the Hundred Years War. His claims was at the expense of John of Montfort, the pro-English claimant to the duchy of Brittany. John was compensated with the Honour of Richmond, the first time the title was separated from the land it represented. Robert only held the title for a year before dying in support of Montfort near Vannes during the Breton War of Succession.

=== Earls of Richmond, 5th Creation (1342) ===
- John of Gaunt, 1st Earl of Richmond (1340–1399), a son of Edward III; surrendered earldom 1372 (Note: He surrendered the Earldom among other British rights and holdings in order to pursue his claim to the Crown of Castile) to Edward III; other estates merged into the crown at his death under Richard II

=== Earls of Richmond, 2nd Creation (restored 1372) ===
From 1341, the title and honour were separated permanently. Members of the Montfort family of Brittany regained the honour in 1372, lost and regained it in 1381, lost it again in 1384, regained it briefly in 1420, but lost it permanently in 1425 when Arthur, second son of John IV of Brittany, joined the French side and became constable of France in the final phase of the Hundred Years War. The family continued to use the title until the merger of the line into the French royal family in 1547.

- John IV, Duke of Brittany (1372–1399), eldest son of John of Montfort
- Arthur, Earl of Richmond (1393–1425), second son of John IV

Titular Montfort earls:

- Arthur, Earl of Richmond (1425–1458), later Arthur III, Duke of Brittany
- Francis II, Duke of Brittany (1458–1488), nephew of Arthur III
- Anne, Duchess of Brittany (1488–1514), daughter of Francis II
- Claude, Duchess of Brittany (1514–1524), daughter of Anne
- Francis III, Duke of Brittany (1524–1536), eldest son of Claude
- Henry, Duke of Brittany (1536–1547), second son of Claude, became Henry II of France in 1547

=== Earls of Richmond, 6th Creation (1414) ===
- John of Lancaster, 1st Duke of Bedford (1389–1435) – created earl by his brother Henry V in 1414. John died without legitimate issue in 1435, and his title and honours as Earl of Richmond reverted to the crown during the reign of Henry VI.

=== Earls of Richmond, 7th Creation (1452) ===
- Edmund Tudor, 1st Earl of Richmond (1430–1456) – created earl by Henry VI in 1452.
- Henry Tudor, 2nd Earl of Richmond (1456–1509) – posthumous son of Edmund Tudor; the title was deemed forfeit in 1461 by the Yorkists, but claimed by Henry nonetheless; George Plantagenet, 1st Duke of Clarence, was then given the title, 1st Earl of Richmond, by King Edward IV, the title passed on to Richard Plantagenet, Duke of Gloucester (Richard III) after Clarence's execution; despite the Yorkists, Henry was recognised as indisputable heir by Francis II, Duke of Brittany, who surrendered his rights to him and aided his side in the Battle of Bosworth Field, after which Henry became King Henry VII of England. The Honour of Richmond became a personal fief of the Tudor dynasty. The title was merged into the crown.

== See also ==
- Duke of Brittany
- House of Lancaster
- House of Plantagenet
- House of Montfort
- Tudor dynasty
- Honour of Richmond
- Richmond Herald
- White Greyhound of Richmond
- Holders of the Honour of Richmond without title Earl of Richmond

Ralph Neville, 1st Earl of Westmorland
George Plantagenet, 1st Duke of Clarence

- Titular Earls of Richmond (House of Montfort, Brittany)

John VI, Duke of Brittany
Francis I, Duke of Brittany
Peter II, Duke of Brittany
Arthur III, Duke of Brittany
Francis II, Duke of Brittany

- Duke of Richmond

== Bibliography ==
- Butler, Lawrence (2003). "The origins of the honour of Richmond and its castles". In Liddiard, Robert (ed.). Anglo Norman Castles. Woodbridge, Suffolk: The Boydell Press. ISBN 0-85115-904-4.
- de Froissart, John (1806). Sir John Froissart's Chronicles of England, France, Spain, and the Adjoining Countries. Vol. II. London: Longman.
- Everard, Judith; Jones, Michael (1999). The Charters of Duchess Constance of Brittany and her Family (1171–1221). Woodbridge: Boydell Press. ISBN 0-85115-751-3.
- Keats-Rohan, K.S.B. (1992). "The Bretons and Normans of England 1066–1154" Nottingham Medieval Studies (PDF). Archived from the original (PDF) on 24 July 2011.
