= Odo II of Porhoët =

Odo II, Viscount of Porhoet (died after 1180) was the son of Geoffroy, Viscount de Porhoët, and his wife Hawise (possibly Fergant). He became Duke of Brittany in 1148, jure uxoris, upon his marriage to Bertha, Duchess of Brittany.

On Bertha's death, Odo II denied her son Conan IV of Penthièvre, Duke of Brittany his inheritance. While Odo II's marriage to Bertha was his first, it was her second marriage, her first being to Alain 'le Noir' de Penthièvre, Lord of Richmond (Alan, 1st Earl of Richmond). Odo II allied with his brother-in-law, Hoèl, Count of Nantes. Odo II was deposed by his stepson Conan IV in 1156, and taken prisoner by Conan IV's ally Raoul de Fougères.

He married secondly, in 1167, a daughter of Guihomar IV, Viscount of Léon, and his wife Nobilis, sometimes identified by the names Eleanor or Joan by later authors (Note: Her name is not specified in primary sources. She has been variously identified with Eleanor of Léon, later wife of Riwallon of Rosmadec or Enoguen "Gwen" (Gallicised into Jeanne), later wife of Andrew II, Baron of Vitré)

== Issue ==
Odo II had two children with Bertha:

- Geoffrey de Porhoët
- Adelaide (or Alix) of Porhoët (d. 1220). She was sent to Henry II of England's court as a hostage and was alleged by his enemies to have become his mistress. This accusation remains unclear. She later became Abbess of Fontevrault.

Odo II and his second wife had three or four children:

- Odo III of Porhoët (died 1231). He was married, but the name of his wife is not known.
- Harvey or Henry of Porhoët
- Eleanor of Porhoët, wife of Conan of Penthièvre, de La Roche-Derrien, son of Henry of Penthièvre, Count of Tréguier and Guingamp, and Mathilde de Vendôme.
- maybe Alice of Porhoët, who married into the Mauvoisin family

== Sources ==
- Everard, J. A. (2004). Brittany and the Angevins: Province and Empire 1158–1203. Cambridge University Press.
- Jankulak, Karen (2000). The Medieval Cult of St Petroc. The Boydell Press.
- Morvan, Frederic (2009a). La Chevalerie bretonne et la formation de l'armee ducale, 1260-1341 (in French). Presses Universitaires de Rennes.
- Morvan, Frédéric (2009b). Les règlements des conflits de succession dans la noblesse bretonne au XIIIe siècle. Annales de Bretagne et des Pays de l'Ouest.
- Vincent, Nicholas (2007). "The Court of Henry II". In Harper-Bill, Christopher; Vincent, Nicholas (eds.). Henry II: New Interpretations. The Boydell Press.
- Warren, W. L. (1977). Henry II. University of California Press.
