= Stephen, Count of Tréguier =

Breton noble

Stephen of Penthièvre, Count of Tréguier, 3rd Lord of Richmond (1058/62 – 21 April 1136) was a Breton noble and a younger son of Odo, Count of Penthièvre and Agnes of Cornouaille, sister of Hoël II, Duke of Brittany. In 1093, he succeeded to the title of Count of Tréguier; in 1098, he succeeded his brother Alain as Lord of Richmond in Yorkshire, England.

== Life ==
Stephen was the son of Odo, Count of Penthièvre and Agnes of Cornouaille. He is sometimes misidentified as "Stephen, Count of Brittany" in the court documents of King Henry I. This may be due to his Breton heritage, or the fact that he owned large estates there, but in fact at the time Brittany was a Duchy ruled by Alan IV, Duke of Brittany.

Stephen was a benefactor of religious houses. In 1110, he and his wife, Hawise, founded the Augustine Abbey of St Croix in Guingamp. On an unknown date, he is recorded as having donated property to Rumbaugh Priory for the souls of his wife and children.

He was the paternal grandfather of Conan IV, Duke of Brittany.

== Family ==
Stephen married Hawise of Blois, also known as Hawise of Guingamp, daughter of Theobald III, Count of Blois and Adele of Valois. Their children were:

- Geoffrey II "Boterel", Count of Penthièvre, married Hawise de Dol, by whom he had issue. Geoffrey received Stephen's Breton lands and was a supporter of Empress Matilda during The Anarchy.
- Alan de Bretagne, 1st Earl of Richmond (died 15 September 1146) married Bertha of Brittany, by whom he had issue, including his heir Conan IV, Duke of Brittany. Alan is also known as Alan Niger II; he received Stephen's English lands and supported Stephen, King of England during The Anarchy.
- Henry, Count of Tréguier, married Mathilde de Vendome,
- Maud, married Walter de Gant, by whom she had issue
- Olive, married firstly Henry de Fougères, by whom she had issue; secondly William de St. John.
- Theophania (Tiphanie), married Rabel de Tancarville, Chamberlain of Normandy, by whom she had issue (Note: William de Tancarville was her son; it was he who trained and knighted William Marshal, 1st Earl of Pembroke.)
- Eléonore, married Alan de Dinan, by whom she had issue.

He died on 21 April 1136 and was buried in the Abbey of St Mary at York.

== Sources ==
- Morin, Stéphane (2010). Trégor, Goëlo, Penthièvre. Le pouvoir des Comtes de Bretagne du XIIe au XIIIe siècle. Presses Universitaires de Rennes.
- Morvan, Frederic (2009). La Chevalerie bretonne et la formation de l'armee ducale, 1260-1341 (in French). Presses Universitaires de Rennes.

Peerage of England
Preceded by Alan the Black	Earl of Richmond; 1096x1098–1136	Succeeded by Alan le Noir
