= Peter I of Brittany =

Duke of Brittany from 1213 to 1221

Peter I
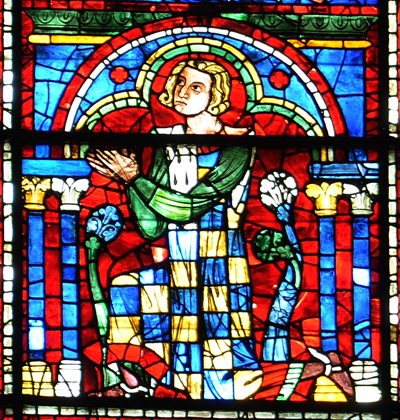
- Peter represented on a window in Chartres Cathedral

Duke of Brittany
- Reign: 1213–1221
- Predecessor: Alix
- Successor: John I
- Co-ruler: Alix

Regent of Brittany
- Regency: 1221–1237
- Monarch: John I
- Born: c. 1187
- Died: 26 May 1250 (aged 63)
- Spouses: Alix, Duchess of Brittany; Nicole; Margaret of Commequiers
- Issue: John I, Duke of Brittany; Yolande, Countess of Penthièvre; Arthur of Brittany; Oliver, Lord of Machecoul
- House: Dreux
- Father: Robert II, Count of Dreux
- Mother: Yolande de Coucy

Coat of Arms of Peter I, Duke of Brittany and his successors

Peter I (French: Pierre; c. 1187 – 26 May 1250), also known as Peter Mauclerc and Peter of Dreux, reigned as Duke of Brittany alongside his wife Alix from 1213 to 1221, and was regent of the duchy for his minor son John I from 1221 to 1237. As duke he was also 1st Earl of Richmond from 1218 to 1235.

== Origins ==
Peter was the second son of Robert II, Count of Dreux and Yolande de Coucy. The former was in turn the son of Robert I, Count of Dreux, a younger brother of Louis VII of France. Peter was thus a Capetian, a second cousin of Louis VIII of France.

Despite being of royal descent, as the younger son of a cadet branch Peter's early prospects were that of a minor noble, with a few scattered fiefs in the Île-de-France and Champagne. He was initially destined for a career in the clergy, which he later renounced, earning him the nickname Mauclerc (French: mauvais clerc, bad-cleric). He broke the convention of ecclesiastical heraldry by placing on the canton of his paternal arms the ermine, then reserved for the clergy.

== Accession ==
In 1212 King Philip II of France needed to find a weak and faithful ruler for Brittany. The duchy lay athwart the sea lanes between England and the English territories in Gascony. Furthermore, it bordered on Anjou and Normandy, which the English had lost ten or twelve years before and were eager to recover. It was being ruled with less than a strong hand by Guy of Thouars, as regent for his young daughter Alix. Also worrisome was that Alix's older half-sister Eleanor, Fair Maid of Brittany, was in an English prison.

King Philip thus broke off the betrothal of Alix and the Breton lord Henry of Penthièvre, and turned to his French cousin Peter, then in his early twenties. Peter married Alix, and on 27 January 1213, paid homage to the king for Brittany.

There is some ambiguity regarding whether Peter should be considered duke or count. The duchy was legally held by his wife. The king of France and the Pope (and their courts) always addressed him as count, but Peter in his own charters called himself duke.

== Relations with the English ==
In 1214 King John of England had assembled a formidable coalition against the French. He landed in Poitou while Otto IV of Germany prepared to invade from the north. John chased off some French forces in the north of Poitou, and then moved to the southern edge of Brittany, opposite Nantes. Peter drove him off after a brief skirmish but did nothing to hinder John's subsequent movement up the Loire valley where he took a few Breton fortresses and then besieged La Roche-aux-Moines. John's Poitevin vassals, however, refused to fight against a French force led by Prince Louis of France. Meanwhile, Otto's army was crushed at Bouvines, and the entire invasion foundered.

It is not clear why John attempted to capture Nantes, even less why he would do so the hardest way, via the very well-defended bridge across the Loire. Nor is it clear why Peter declined to harass his forces from the rear as John marched east. A likely explanation is that the two had come to some sort of agreement whereby John would leave Brittany alone for the moment, and in return the Bretons would not hinder him elsewhere.

John had a prize he could dangle in front of Peter: the Earldom of Richmond. This great English honour had traditionally been held by the dukes of Brittany, and in fact a constant theme in Peter's political affairs was the desire to hold and retain the English revenues from Richmond.

Peter did not yield to King John's offers to accept the earldom and take up the king's side in his conflicts with the English barons, probably because he deemed John's prospects too uncertain. Moreover, Louis was again fighting against the English. But when Louis was defeated, Peter was sent as one of the negotiators for a peace treaty. After the negotiations were completed (in 1218), William Marshal, the regent for the young Henry III of England, recognized Peter as Earl of Richmond, in place of Eleanor of Brittany who remained under English imprisonment. The center of the earldom's properties in Yorkshire was in the hands of the Earl of Chester, whom the regent could not afford to antagonize, but Peter did receive the properties of the earldom outside of Yorkshire, which in fact generated the bulk of the earldom's income. In 1219 he participated in the capture of Marmande and the siege of Toulouse during the Albigensian Crusade.

== Consolidation of power ==
Peter turned his attention to his next goal. The authority of the dukes of Brittany had traditionally been weak, in comparison to the great peers of northern France. For example, the duke could not limit the building of castles by his counts. Nor did he have the right to guardianship of minor heirs of his vassals. Peter aimed to re-establish his relationship with his vassals (or subjects) more along the lines of what he knew from the Capetian royal court. To that end Peter simply declared new rules by fiat, and then faced the inevitable turmoil that resulted from the reaction of his barons. There followed a series of small civil wars and political maneuverings. In 1222 he suppressed a revolt by Breton barons in the Battle of Châteaubriant. By 1223, the barons had all acquiesced to the changes or been dispossessed.

The six Breton bishops were the other threat to the ducal power, for they had substantial landholdings (including control of all or part of the few cities in Brittany), and were recalcitrant in the face of Peter's attempts to raise revenues by increasing taxes or simply taking possession of episcopal holdings. For this he was excommunicated for a time in 1219–1221. Peter submitted in the end, but this was not to be the last of his conflict with the bishops.

== Regency ==
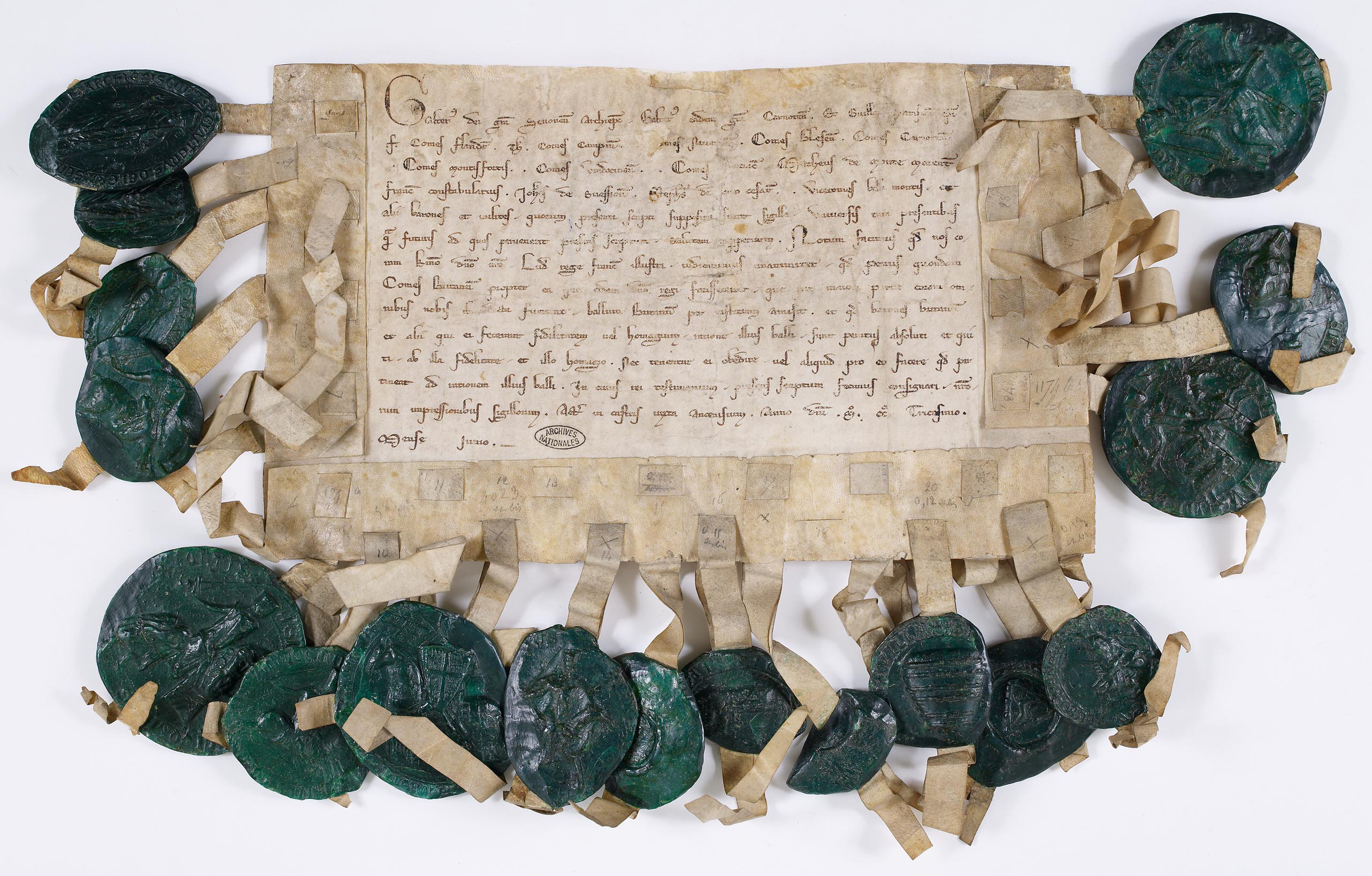
The original sealed copy of the declaration of forfeiture against Peter for rebellion (1230)

Peter's wife died on 21 October 1221, leaving behind four young children. She was then only 21, and little is known about her beyond the basic genealogical facts. Her death meant that Peter was no longer duke, although he continued to rule the duchy with undiminished authority, as regent for his son John, then a boy of four or so.

Alix's death changed Peter's goals in two ways. First, he aimed to acquire some additional territory, not part of the duchy, to augment his retirement after his son came of age. Second, there was a strong tradition in France that a minor heir should, when coming of age, have his property in the state it was in when he inherited it. Thus Peter could not now take some risks without fear of harming the prospects of his son.

Peter helped Philip II's successor, Louis VIII, in his fight against Henry III of England (in the sieges of Niort and La Rochelle in 1224). He also accompanied Louis VIII on the Albigensian Crusade. According to Nicholas of Bray, he was present at the siege of Avignon in June–September. After Louis's death in November, he participated, with Count Theobald IV of Champagne and Count Hugh X of La Marche, in rebellions against the regent Blanche of Castile, which lasted from 1227 until 1234.

In 1235 Peter renounced his allegiance to the king of England and suffered forfeiture of his English earldom, while Henry III began to give Eleanor better treatments, granting her the manor of Swaffham from the earldom. However, Pope Gregory IX announced that he only recognized descendants of Peter and Alix legitimate heirs to Brittany; whatever the intention of Henry, Eleanor was after all not restored of any titles nor released from confinement until her death in 1241.

== Crusades and death ==
Peter making a truce with an-Nasir Dawud during his crusade

Peter's son John reached the age of majority in 1237. Peter Mauclerc then participated in the Barons' Crusade to the Holy Land in 1239. While there, Peter's troops along with some local knights were attacked by heavily armed Mamluk cavalry, firing their bows, but the crusader force managed to outflank and defeat them, taking a few prisoners with them back to Jaffa.

In early November, two days into a march from Acre to Ascalon, Peter and his lieutenant Ralph of Soissons split off from the main force to conduct a raid. They divided their force in half and each waited in ambush along a possible route for the Muslim caravan which was moving up the Jordan to Damascus. Peter's half clashed with the Muslims outside of a castle, and after some fighting, he sounded his horn to summon Raoul. The Muslims were routed and fled inside the castle, where Peter's men followed them, killed many, took some captives, and seized the booty and edible animals of the caravan. This minor victory would soon be overshadowed by a serious defeat at Gaza.

Back in France, he won some success against the English at sea in 1242 and 1243. In 1249, he participated in the Seventh Crusade to Egypt under King Louis IX. He died at sea before he was able to return home. He was buried in Braine, France.

== Marriages and children ==
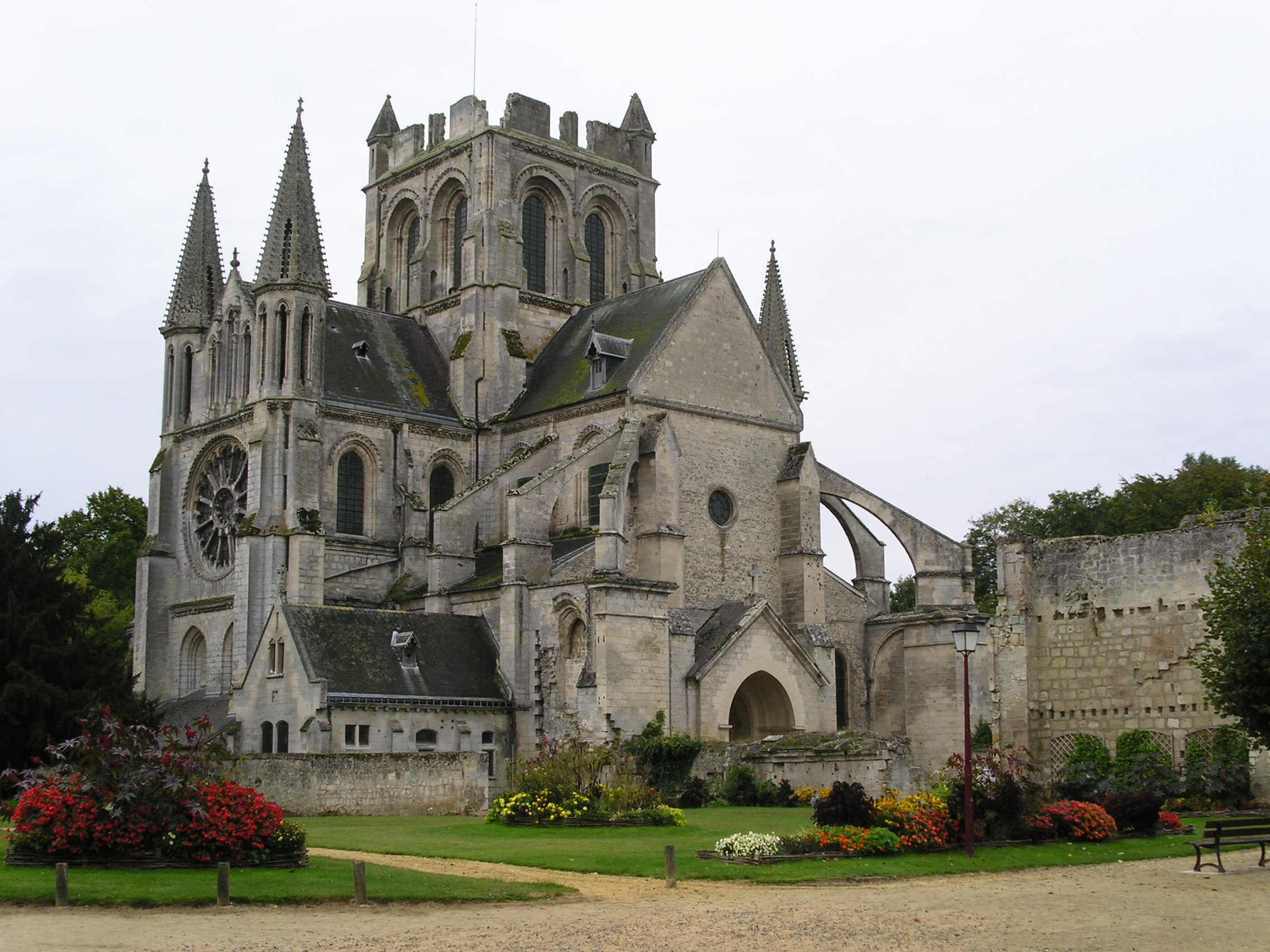
Braisne Abbey in Aisne, Saint-Yved de Braine, the necropolis of the counts of Dreux where Peter I is buried

Peter was married twice:

His first wife was Alix of Thouars, Duchess of Brittany (1201–1221). Alix and Peter had three children:

- John I (to 1217–1286), duke of Brittany;
- Yolande of Brittany (1218 – 10 October 1272), married (January 1236) to Hugh XI of Lusignan, Seigneur de Lusignan, Count of la Marche and Angoulême
- Arthur of Brittany (1220–1224)

His second wife was Marguerite de Montaigu, Lady of Montaigu, Commequiers, La Garnache then Machecoul, and widow of Hugh I de Thouars (died 1230), a brother to Guy of Thouars; this made Marguerite a paternal line aunt of Alix. They married by 1236, and had no issue.

Peter had an son by a woman called Nicole:

- Oliver de Braine (1231–1279), who inherited the Lordship of Machecoul.

== Bibliography ==
- Jackson-Laufer, Guida Myrl (1999). Women Rulers Throughout the Ages: An Illustrated Guide. ABC-CLIO. ISBN 9781576070918.
- Morvan, Frederic (2009). La Chevalerie bretonne et la formation de l'armee ducale (in French). Presses Universitaires de Rennes.
- Painter, Sidney (1969). "The Crusade of Theobald of Champagne and Richard of Cornwall, 1239–1241". In Robert Lee Wolff; Harry W. Hazard (eds.). A History of the Crusades, Volume II: The Later Crusades, 1189–1311. Madison: University of Wisconsin Press.
- Painter, Sidney (2019) [1937]. The Scourge of the Clergy: Peter of Dreux, Duke of Brittany. Johns Hopkins University Press. ISBN 9781421436586.
- Puylaurens, William of (2003). The Chronicle of William of Puylaurens: The Albigensian Crusade and its Aftermath. Translated by Sibly, W.A.; Sibly, M.D. Boydell Press.

Peter I of Brittany House of Dreux Cadet branch of the Capetian dynasty Born: circa 1187 Died: 26 May 1250
Regnal titles
Preceded by Alix	Duke of Brittany; 1213–1221 with Alix	Succeeded by John I
Peerage of England
Vacant Title last held by Eleanor of Brittany	Earl of Richmond; 1218–1235	Vacant Title next held by Peter of Savoy
