= Conan III of Brittany =

Duke of Brittany from 1112 to 1148

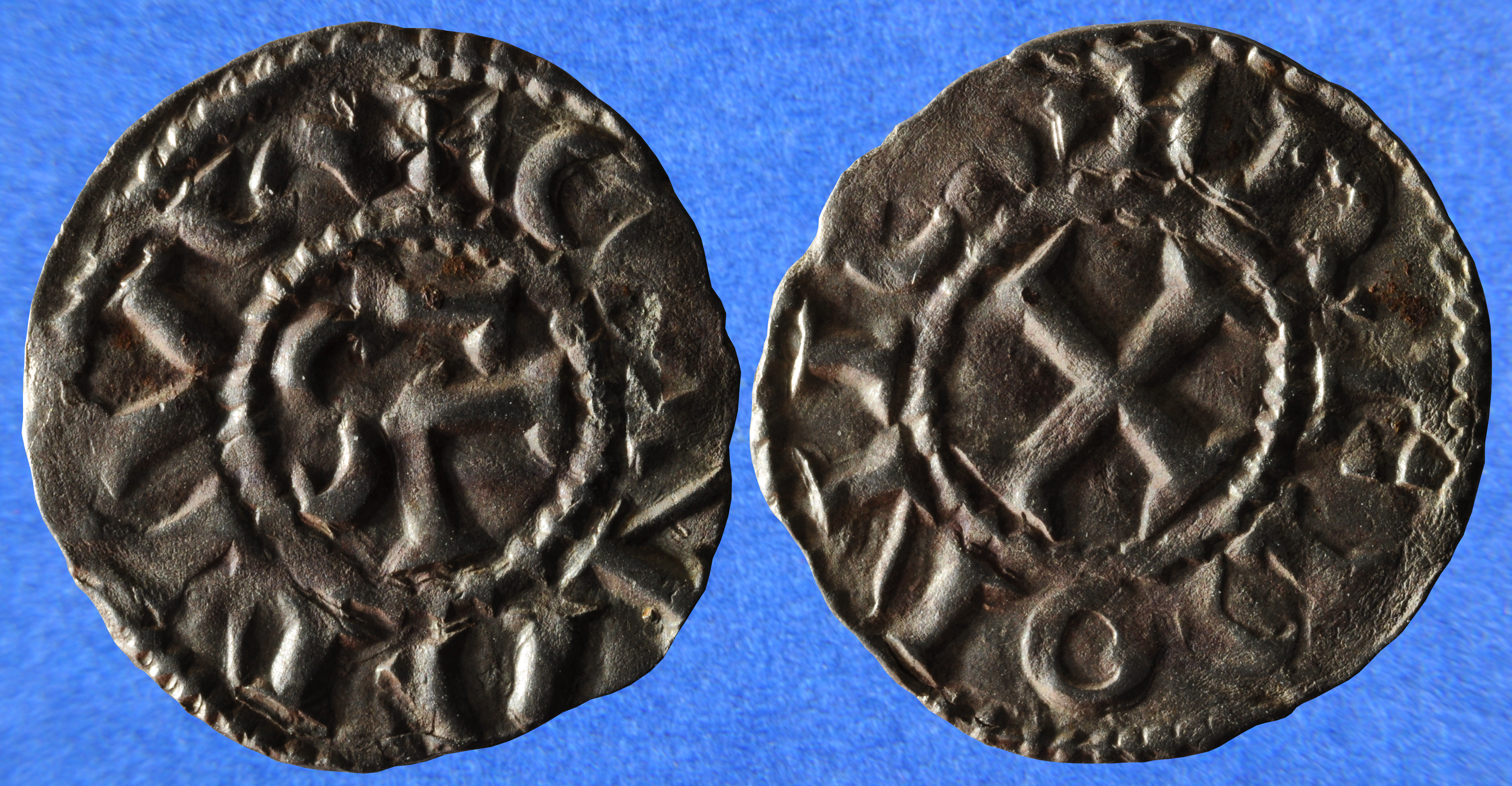
B29 denier de Conan III, duc de Bretagne (18964049549).jpg

Conan III, also known as Conan of Cornouaille and Conan the Fat (Breton: Konan III a Vreizh, and Konan Kerne; c. 1093–1096 – 17 September 1148) was duke of Brittany, from 1112 to his death. He was the son of Alan IV, Duke of Brittany and Ermengarde of Anjou.

Conan III allied himself with Stephen of England in the Anarchy, Stephen's war against the dispossessed Empress Matilda. (Note: Stephen created Conan's son-in-law Alan 1st Earl of Richmond. Alan rode by the side of Stephen in the Battle of Lincoln.) (Note: The Earldom of Richmond was inherited by Alan's son, and Conan III's grandson Conan IV. It would remain in the ducal house of Brittany for some time.)

== Family ==
He married Maud, an illegitimate daughter of King Henry I of England before 1113. Conan and Maud had three children that are known:

- Hoel (1116–1156) – disinherited from the ducal crown; Count of Nantes;
- Bertha (1114 – after 1155) – married Alan of Penthièvre; (Note: King Stephen of England created Alan 1st Earl of Richmond and 1st Earl of Cornwall) upon Alan's death in 1146, she returned to Brittany;
- Constance (1120–1148) – married Sir Geoffroy II, Sire de Mayenne, son of Juhel II, Seigneur de Mayenne.

== Succession ==
On his death-bed in 1148, Conan III disinherited Hoël III from succession to the duchy, stating that he was illegitimate and no son of his. By this surprise move Bertha became his heiress and successor. However, Hoël III was to retain the County of Nantes.

== Bibliography ==
- Bryan, Elizabeth J. (2016). "Matthew Parker and the Middle English Prose Brut". In Rajsic, Jaclyn; Kooper, Erik; Hoche, Dominique (eds.). The Prose Brut and Other Late Medieval Chronicles. York Medieval Press.
- Everard, J. A. (2004). Brittany and the Angevins: Province and Empire 1158–1203. Cambridge University Press.
- Warren, Wilfred Lewis (1977). Henry II. Yale University Press.

== See also ==
- Dukes of Brittany family tree

Conan III of Brittany House of Cornouaille Born: c.1053 Died: 17 September 1148
Regnal titles
| Preceded by Alan IV | Duke of Brittany; 1112–1148 | Succeeded by Bertha; Odo II |
| Preceded by Alan IV | Count of Nantes and Rennes; 1112–1148 | Succeeded by Hoel III |
