= Conan IV of Brittany =

Duke of Brittany from 1156 to 1166

Conan IV
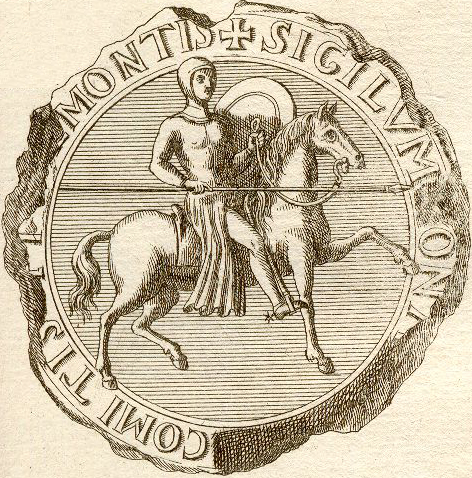

Duke of Brittany
- Reign: 1156–1166
- Predecessor: Odo II & Bertha
- Successor: Constance

Earl of Richmond
- Tenure: 1146–1171
- Predecessor: Alan
- Successor: Constance
- Born: c. 1138
- Died: 18/20 February 1171
- Burial: Bégard Monastery
- Spouse: Margaret of Huntingdon
- Issue: Constance, Duchess of Brittany; William
- House: Penthièvre
- Father: Alan, 1st Earl of Richmond
- Mother: Bertha, Duchess of Brittany

Banner of Conan IV of the House of Penthièvre

Conan IV (c. 1138 – 18/20 February 1171), called the Young, was the Duke of Brittany from 1156 to 1166. He was the son of Bertha, Duchess of Brittany, and her first husband, Alan, Earl of Richmond. Conan IV was his father's heir as Earl of Richmond and his mother's heir as Duke of Brittany. (Note: Conan IV's mother was the daughter of Duke Conan III.) Conan and his daughter Constance would be the only representatives of the House of Penthièvre to rule Brittany.

== Accession ==
Conan was the son of Duchess Bertha by her first husband, Alan, 1st Earl of Richmond. With the death of his mother in early 1156, Conan IV expected to inherit the ducal throne. However, he was denied his inheritance by his stepfather, Odo II, Viscount of Porhoët, who refused to relinquish authority. Odo may have entered into a pact with Conan's maternal uncle, Hoel, Count of Nantes, with the goal of dividing Brittany between them. Being under threat of rebellion in Nantes, sponsored by Geoffrey VI, Count of Anjou, Hoel could not send Odo any aid. Within the year Conan IV was able to capture and imprison Odo and claim his inheritance.

Conan also inherited the title Earl of Richmond from his father Alan, which made him subject to both the King of England and the King of France.

== Plantagenet ambitions ==
Henry II of England, the Count of Anjou, attempted to obtain control of the Duchy of Brittany, which neighboured his lands and had traditionally been largely independent from the rest of France, with its own language and culture. The Breton dukes held little power across most of the duchy, which was mostly controlled by local lords. In 1148, Duke Conan III died and civil war broke out. Henry claimed to be the overlord of Brittany, on the basis that the duchy had owed loyalty to Henry I, and saw controlling the duchy both as a way of securing his other French territories and as a potential inheritance for one of his sons. (Note: Historian Judith Everard's research into Brittany has shifted academic discussion of this period, stressing the indirect way that Henry expanded his power; earlier works had tended to describe Henry as conquering Brittany through a sequence of invasions; see, for example, John Gillingham's description of the period.) Initially Henry's strategy was to rule indirectly through proxies, and accordingly Henry supported Conan IV's claims over most of the duchy, partly because Conan had strong English ties and could be easily influenced. Conan's uncle, Hoel, continued to control the county of Nantes in the east until he was deposed in 1156 by Henry's brother, Geoffrey VI, possibly with Henry's support.

When Geoffrey of Anjou died in 1158, Conan attempted to reclaim Nantes and held possession of the city for a few days. Conan's control of Nantes had the effect of reuniting Brittany and controlling the previously largely independent city from the duchy. However, he was opposed by Henry who annexed it for himself. At Michaelmas 1158, Conan IV surrendered Nantes and its surrounding territories to King Henry II at Avranches. King Louis VII of France took no action to intervene as Henry steadily increased his power in Brittany.

Peace and the continuation of Angevin policy and interests in Brittany were formalized in 1160 as Conan married Henry's cousin Margaret, sister of the Scottish king William the Lion. Conan and Margaret had at least one daughter, Constance. (Note: Margaret of Huntingdon made a donation for the souls of "herself, Duke Conan IV, and 'our boys', or 'our children' (pro salute anime... puerorum... nostrorum). This would seem to be a reference to at least one son of the marriage who did not survive infancy, leaving Constance as heiress in 1166." (Everard and Jones, The Charters of Duchess Constance and Her Family (1171-1221), The Boydell Press, 1999, p 94).) A son of Conan's named William appears to have still been alive towards 1200. (Note: Two charters made by Constance and her son Arthur towards 1200 mention a brother of Constance, William. As a boy, William should have inherited the duchy after Conan. According to Everard, Henry II's forcing Constance's father into abdicating in 1166 was meant to prevent any son of the duke from inheriting the duchy. According to her, the fact that Constance's brother was called William seems to indicate that he was not an illegitimate son of Conan IV, as William was the name of Margaret's brother, the King of Scots. (Everard, Judith (2000). Brittany and the Angevins: Province and Empire, 1158-1203. Cambridge University Press, 2000, p 43).)

== Unrest and abdication ==
Conan faced several revolts from his own nobles, rebellions possibly covertly supported by England. To put down the unrest, the Duke appealed for help to Henry II, who, in return, demanded the betrothal of Constance to Henry's younger son Geoffrey.

While local Breton nobles began to rebel against Conan IV, Henry had begun to alter his policy of indirect rule in Brittany and started to exert more direct control. In 1164, Henry intervened to seize lands along the border of Brittany and Normandy, and in 1166 invaded Brittany to punish the local barons. Henry then forced Conan to abdicate as duke and to give Brittany to his heir and daughter Constance, and Conan also betrothed Constance to Henry's son Geoffrey. (Note: The English Heritage Website's history of Richmond Castle and the Earldom of Richmond describes the abdication as Conan's "wise surrender [of] the duchy to Henry II.") This arrangement was quite unusual in terms of medieval law, as Conan might have had sons who could have legitimately inherited the duchy. (Note: Henry never formally became Duke of Brittany as he was only holding the duchy on behalf of Geoffrey and Constance. According to the English Heritage Website history of Richmond Castle and the Earldom of Richmond, Henry "kept the Honour of Richmond until it could be inherited by Geoffrey on his marriage to Constance.")

Henry II had claimed to be Overlord of Brittany, as would his son Richard the Lionheart. However, Henry never claimed the Dukedom of Brittany. After Conan IV abdicated, Henry II held guardianship over Brittany for Conan's daughter Constance, until such time as Henry II's fourth legitimate son, Geoffrey Plantagenet, could marry her, and inherit the duchy for himself.

Henry II, allowed Conan to keep his paternal inheritance: the Earldom of Richmond, and the barony of Tréguier. He kept these titles until Conan died and they were technically passed to his daughter. However, like the duchy, Richmond and Nantes were held by Henry himself until 1183, and 1185/1186, respectively, following the marriage in 1181.

Conan IV died on 18 or 20 February 1171.

== Portrayals in literature ==
Conan is usually remembered in Breton historiography as a weak ruler, unable to protect his duchy against the powerful Angevin king, although historian Eric Borgnis-Desbordes has recently qualified this opinion.

Conan IV is mentioned in the tragedy Jean sans Terre ou la mort d'Arthur (1791) by Jean-François Ducis, the novels Time and Chance (2002), Prince of Darkness (2005) and Devil's Brood (2008) by Sharon Kay Penman, and the second volume of the trilogy Le Château des Poulfenc (2009) by Brigitte Coppin.

== See also ==
- List of rulers of Brittany

== Notes ==
Conan IV of Brittany House of Penthièvre Born: 1138 Died: 20 February 1171
Regnal titles
Preceded by Bertha	Duke of Brittany; Count of Rennes; 1156–1166	Succeeded by Constance
Preceded by Geoffrey I	Count of Nantes; 1158	Succeeded by Henry
Peerage of England
Preceded by Alan the Black	Earl of Richmond; 1146–1166	Succeeded by Constance
