= Margaret of Huntingdon, Duchess of Brittany =

Duchess of Brittany, Countess of Richmond (1145–1201)

Margaret of Huntingdon
- Duchess of Brittany, Countess of Richmond; Countess of Hereford
- Born: 1145
- Died: 4/5 September 1201
- Burial: Sawtrey Abbey, Huntingdonshire
- Spouse: Conan IV, Duke of Brittany; Humphrey III de Bohun; Sir William fitz Patrick de Hertburn
- Issue more...: Constance, Duchess of Brittany; Henry de Bohun, 1st Earl of Hereford
- House: Dunkeld
- Father: Henry of Scotland
- Mother: Ada de Warenne

Margaret of Huntingdon (1145 – 1201) was a Scottish princess and Duchess of Brittany. She was the sister of Scottish kings Malcolm IV and William I, wife of Conan IV, Duke of Brittany, and the mother of Constance, Duchess of Brittany. Her second husband was Humphrey de Bohun, hereditary Constable of England. Following her second marriage, Margaret styled herself as the Countess of Hereford.

== Life ==
Margaret's parents were Henry of Scotland, Earl of Huntingdon and Northumbria, and Ada de Warenne. She has traditionally been considered the second-eldest daughter, younger than Ada, but it is possible that Margaret was the eldest since she married before Ada and was named after their paternal great-grandmother Saint Margaret (while Ada was named after their maternal great-grandmother Adelaide of Vermandois). Through her father, Margaret was the granddaughter of King David I of Scotland and Queen Maud, 2nd Countess of Huntingdon.

In 1160, Margaret became Duchess of Brittany and Countess of Richmond by marrying her first husband, Conan IV, Duke of Brittany, Earl of Richmond. Margaret's origins and first marriage were deduced by Benedict of Peterborough. Together Conan and Margaret had at least four children:

- Constance, Duchess of Brittany (c. 1161 – September 1201), married firstly in 1181, Geoffrey Plantagenet, by whom she had three children, including Arthur I of Brittany; she married secondly in 1188, Ranulph de Blondeville, 4th Earl of Chester; she married thirdly in 1199, Guy of Thouars, by whom she had twin daughters, including Alix of Thouars;
- At least two children who died young; (Note: Margaret of Huntingdon made a donation for the souls of "herself, Duke Conan IV, and 'our boys', or 'our children' (pro salute anime... puerorum... nostrorum). This would seem to be a reference to at least one son of the marriage who did not survive infancy, leaving Constance as heiress in 1166." (Everard and Jones, The Charters of Duchess Constance and Her Family (1171-1221), The Boydell Press, 1999, p.94))
- William (d. aft. 1199/1201). (Note: Two charters made by Constance and her son Arthur towards 1200 mention a brother of Constance, William. As a boy, William should have inherited the duchy after Conan. According to Everard, Henry II's forcing Constance's father into abdicating in 1166 was meant to prevent any son of the Duke from inheriting the duchy. According to her, the fact that Constance's brother was called William seems to indicate that he was not an illegitimate son of Conan IV, as William was the name of one of Margaret of Huntingdon's brothers. (Everard, Judith (2000). Brittany and the Angevins: Province and Empire, 1158-1203. Cambridge University Press, 2000, p.43))

Margaret's husband died in February 1171, leaving her a widow at the age of twenty-six. Shortly before Easter 1171, she married her second husband, Humphrey III de Bohun, Hereditary Constable of England (c. 1155 – c. 1181). He was the son of Humphrey de Bohun and Margaret of Hereford. Hereafter, she styled herself Countess of Hereford. The marriage produced a son and a daughter: (Note: According to some theories, Margaret of Huntingdon had an additional daughter by either her first or second husband, Margaret (d. after 17 November 1189), second wife of count Pedro Manrique de Lara, Viscount of Narbonne. Contemporary documentation only provides evidence that this Margaret was a kinswoman of Henry II of England. Hypotheses have included the untenable suggestion that she was Margaret of Huntingdon herself, that she was the daughter of one of her husbands, a Bohun sister-in-law, or daughter of Henry's half-brother Hamelin de Warenne, Earl of Surrey.)

- Henry de Bohun, 1st Earl of Hereford (1176 – 1 June 1220), a Magna Carta surety; he married Maud FitzGeoffrey, daughter of Geoffrey Fitz Peter, 1st Earl of Essex by his first wife Beatrice de Say, having three children including Humphrey de Bohun, 2nd Earl of Hereford, ancestor of the later Bohun earls of Hereford;
- Matilda (d. aft. 1184/1185).

Margaret's second husband died in late 1181 and she then married the English nobleman Sir William Fitzpatrick de Hertburn who acquired the lands of Washington in Durham in 1183. This marriage also produced three children:

- Walter de Washington;
- Sir William de Washington (c. 1183 – c. 1239), he married Alice de Lexington by whom he had issue. The Washington family descends from William;
- Marjory de Washington, she married firstly Sir David de Lindsay, and secondly Sir Malcolm FitzWaldeve, a.k.a. Sir Malcolm de Ingoe.

Margaret died on 4 or 5 September 1201 and was buried in Sawtry Abbey, Huntingdonshire. Her third and final husband had died around 1194.

== Portrayals in literature ==
Margaret of Huntingdon is a secondary character in the novel Devil's Brood (2008) by Sharon Kay Penman.

== Sources ==
- Venning, Timothy (2020). A Chronology of Medieval British History, 1066-1307. Routledge.

Royal titles
Preceded by Maud FitzRoy	Duchess consort of Brittany; 1160–1166	Succeeded by Blanche of Navarre
