= Alan, 1st Earl of Richmond =

Breton noble

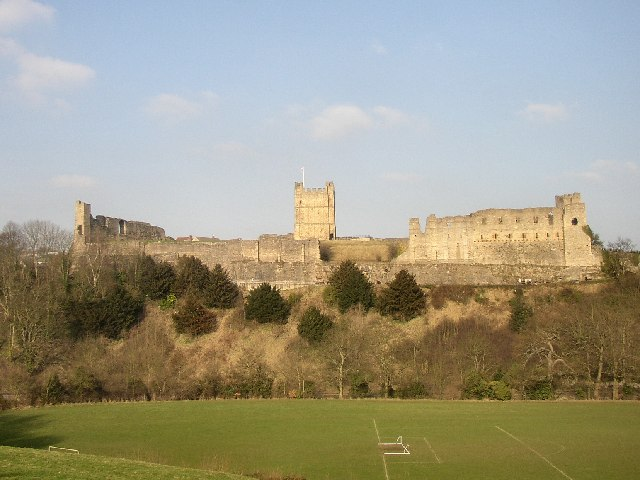
Richmond Castle, Earldom of Richmond

Alan of Penthièvre, 1st Earl of Richmond (before 1100 – 15 September 1146), (Note: Cokayne states that Alan was born before his younger brother Henry, who was born in 1100.) Breton Alan Penteur, also known as "Alan the Black", was a Breton noble who fought for Stephen, King of England. Alan was the third son of Stephen, Count of Tréguier, and Hawise de Guingamp.

== Life ==
The Honour of Richmond had been founded by Alan's uncle, Count Alan Rufus, who had died heirless, so it passed to a younger brother, Count Alan the Black, and then to a yet younger brother, namely Count Stephen. After Count Stephen's death in 1135/6, his Breton lands were inherited by his eldest son, Geoffrey Boterel II, whereas his English lands, the Honour of Richmond, went to Alan. During the Anarchy, Geoffrey supported the dispossessed Empress Matilda and her husband Geoffrey of Anjou, while Alan allied with King Stephen. Alan married Bertha of Brittany, daughter of Conan III, Duke of Brittany, in a politically arranged marriage, perhaps in a move to draw Brittany onto Stephen's side in the conflict against Empress Matilda. In part to promote the alliance with Conan III of Brittany. Stephen created Alan 1st Earl of Richmond. Additionally, Stephen recognized Alan as Earl of Cornwall, in recognition of another of Alan's uncles, Brian, who, Alan claimed, had formerly possessed Cornwall. After the Battle of Lincoln (1141), Alan was captured by Ranulf de Gernon, 4th Earl of Chester and tortured until he relinquished his claim to the Earldom of Cornwall.

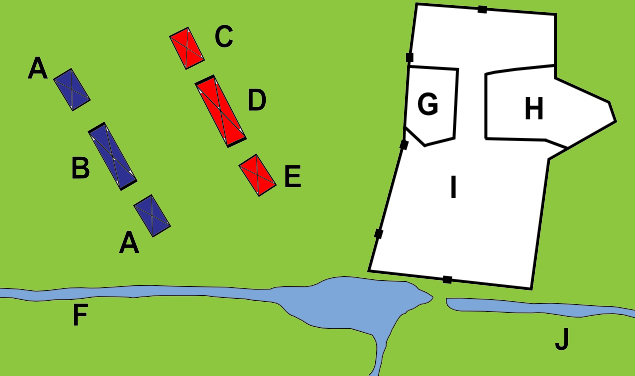
The battle of Lincoln, 1141; Alan is shown to the left of King Stephen; A – Welsh forces; B – Robert of Gloucester; C – Alan; D – Stephen; E – William; F – Fosse Dyke; G – Lincoln Castle; H – Lincoln Cathedral; I – City of Lincoln; J – River Witham

== Family ==
With Bertha, Duchess of Brittany, he had three children:

- Conan IV, Duke of Brittany, their son and heir
- Constance, who married Alan III, Vicomte of Rohan
- Enoguen, abbess of St. Sulpice.

In addition, Alan had four illegitimate sons:

- Bryan FitzAlan, progenitor of the Lords of Bedale in Richmondshire.
- Stephen FitzAlan.
- Reynold FitzAlan.
- Robert FitzAlan.

== Succession ==
Alan died in Brittany by 1146 and was buried at Bégard Monastery. After his death, Bertha returned to Brittany. (Note: In Brittany after Alan's death, Bertha's father Conan III renounced Hoël as his son and heir and designated Bertha as his heiress. When he died, Bertha inherited the Duchy of Brittany. As the dowager Countess of Richmond, Bertha continued to represent the alliance between Brittany and Stephen's England.)

His son Conan IV inherited his title as Earl of Richmond and would later inherit the title Duke of Brittany.

== Bibliography ==
- Barlow, Frank (1955) The Feudal Kingdom of England 1042–1216, London: Longmans, Green; tree opposite p. 288
- Cokayne, G. E. (1945). White, Geoffrey H. (ed.). The Complete Peerage. Vol. x. London: H. A. Doubleday & Lord Howard de Walden.
- Galliou, Patrick, & Jones, Michael (1991) The Bretons, Oxford: Blackwell ISBN 0-631-16406-5; p. 191
- Morvan, Frederic (2009). La Chevalerie bretonne et la formation de l'armee ducale, 1260-1341 (in French). Presses Universitaires de Rennes.

Peerage of England
Preceded by Stephen of Tréguier	Earl of Richmond; 1136–1146	Succeeded by Conan IV of Brittany
