= Odo of Penthièvre =

Duke of Brittany from 1008 to 1035

Odo I
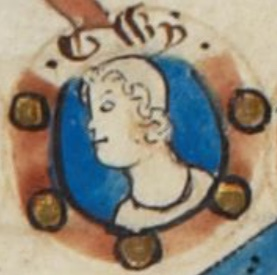

Duke of Brittany, with Alan III
- Reign: 1008–1035
- Predecessor: Geoffrey I
- Successor: Alan III by himself
- Regent: Hawise of Normandy

Count of Penthièvre
- Reign: 1035–1079
- Successor: Geoffrey I

Regent of Brittany
- Reign: 1040–1057
- Born: c. 999
- Died: 7 January 1079 (aged c. 80); Cesson-Sévigné
- Burial: Saint-Brieuc
- Spouse: Orguen-Agnes of Cornouaille
- Issue Detail: Geoffrey I, Count of Penthièvre; Brian, Earl of Cornwall; Alan Rufus
- House: House of Rennes
- Father: Geoffrey I of Brittany
- Mother: Hawise of Normandy

Odo of Rennes (Medieval Breton: Eudon Pentevr, Modern Breton: Eozen Penteur, Latin: Eudo, French: Eudes/Éon de Penthièvre) (Note: Odo in French is Eudes.) (c. 999–1079) was the count of Penthièvre from 1035 until 1079 and the ruler of the Duchy of Brittany from 1008 until 1035.

== Role in Governance of Brittany ==
Odo was the youngest of the three sons of Duke Geoffrey I of Brittany and Hawise of Normandy. When Geoffrey died on 20 November 1008, both Odo and his older brother Alan III were minors.

Duke Geoffrey had initiated a dynastic double marriage with Richard II of Normandy by marrying Hawise, one of Richard's sisters, in 996; this was followed by the marriage of Geoffrey's sister Judith of Brittany to Richard around the year 1000. Alan and Eudon were thus double-first cousins of Duke Richard II's children, including Richard III, Duke of Normandy and Robert I, Duke of Normandy (William the Conqueror's father), nephews of Emma of Normandy, and first cousins of Emma's children Edward the Confessor, Harthacnut, Goda of England, Gunhilda of Denmark and Alfred Aetheling.

At Geoffrey's death, Alan became de jure Duke, as Alan III, Duke of Brittany, (Note: In some histories Eudon is shown co-Duke with his brother Alan, followed by a period where Alan ruled as Duke of Brittany alone. Eudon's position as co-Duke is unlikely and remains an historical uncertainty in search of documented proof. In any event Alan would go on to shed control by Normandy circa 1026, and from this date it is clear there was no ruling role for Eudon until Alan died.) Hawise took on the role of Regent, and Richard asserted the role of Guardian of Brittany, an arrangement reciprocated on the death of Robert I, Duke of Normandy in 1035.

Also in 1035, after a dispute between Eudon and Duke Alan III, their uncle Judicaël Bishop of Vannes arbitrated, and Alan III gave Eudon the bishoprics of Saint-Brieuc, Saint-Malo, Tréguier and Dol-de-Bretagne, as well as the counties and baronies of Penthièvre, Goëlo, Avaugour and Lamballe. Eudon placed his capital at Lamballe, where he began issuing coins in his own name.

Following the death of his brother Duke Alan III in 1040, Eudon ruled as regent of Brittany in the name of his nephew Conan II, holding Conan in custody. Conan was freed by his supporters in 1047. Eudon's regency should have ended when Conan reached his majority (circa 1054), but Eudon refused to relinquish control of the Duchy.

In 1054 Geoffrey, Viscount of Mayenne in Maine, affronted by William of Normandy's new fortifications at Ambrières, "appealed to Geoffrey, Count of Anjou" who "called to his assistance Guy-William of Aquitaine and Count Eudo of Brittany"

In a charter dated to 1056/1060, Eudon ("Eudo") granted land "in pago Belvacensi" (Beauvais, Picardy) to the Abbey of Angers Saint-Aubin (q.v. Albinus of Angers). Witnesses included his wife Orguen and their sons Gausfridus, Alanus Rufus, Willelmus, Rotbertus and Ricardus (Geoffrey, Alan Rufus, William, Robert and Richard).

By 1056 Conan gained the upper hand in Brittany, and in 1057 he captured his uncle Eudon and chained him in a prison cell. Eudon's eldest son Geoffrey Boterel continued to fight against Conan.

In 1062, peace was concluded between Conan and Geoffrey. Eudon, who was now free, continued the fight alone.

In histories favourable to the house of Penthièvre, Eudon is shown as effectively ruling Brittany between 1040 and 1062. In other histories his rule is shown as ending with his capture in 1057.

Conan was a legitimate contender for the title of Duke of Normandy, so he became a serious rival to Duke William.

In 1064, Eudon's liegeman Rivallon I of Dol invited Duke William to join him against Conan, thus initiating the Breton-Norman War of 1064–1065 in which Normandy, Anjou, Dol de Bretagne and the captive Harold Godwinson combined against Conan II, as depicted in three panels of the Bayeux Tapestry. Historians differ on whether William or Conan should be considered the victor in this conflict.

== Involvement in the Preparations for the Norman Conquest of England ==
Eudon provided, trained and equipped 5,000 Breton soldiers for William the Conqueror's army. Of these, 4,000 were professionals, comprising light cavalry, heavy cavalry, archers, crossbowmen and axemen; he also trained 1,000 levied (conscripted) spearmen. Eudon put these troops on 100 ships under the command of his sons Count Alan Rufus and Count Brian, and they sailed from Brittany to join the Norman forces gathering at Barfleur then on to William's staging point at Saint-Valery-sur-Somme, in readiness to cross the Channel.

== Rebellion against Hoel II of Brittany ==
Despite his advanced years, Eudon was involved in the failed 1075/1076 rebellion against Hoel II, Duke of Brittany, by Geoffrey Grenonat of Rennes and Ralph de Gael (fresh from his 1075 rebellion against King William). Hoel II was supported by William the Conqueror, briefly placing Eudon and William on opposing sides once again, a situation that was soon resolved when, to William's disappointment, Hoel came to terms with the rebels.

== Death ==
On 7 January 1079, at about 80 years of age, Eudon died in Cesson-Sévigné, an eastern suburb of Rennes. He was buried in Saint-Brieuc Cathedral.

In his memory, "Comes Alanus Rufus" (Count Alan Rufus), his second son, donated property to Swavesey Abbey in Cambridgeshire, for the soul of "patris sui Eudonis comitis" (his father Count Eudon), by an undated charter witnessed by "...Ribaldus et Bardulfus fratres comitis..." (Ribald and Bardulf, brothers of Count Alan).

== Family ==
Orderic Vitalis stated:

"God also gave him [Count Eudon] seven sons, who became remarkable for the singular and changeable events of their lives. The studious might compose a long and pleasing history, from true accounts of their various fortunes."

Eudon's children with Agnes include:

- Adèle (born c. 1035, died after 1056/57).
- Geoffrey Boterel I, Count of Penthièvre (d. 24 August 1093)
- Brian, Earl of Cornwall (d. after 1084). (Note: The detailed documented histories are lacking and limited. He is presumed to have been illegitimate, though his title of Count suggests that he was a legitimate son, as does the genealogy in Gale's edition of the Registry of the Honour of Richmond which gives his wife's name as Imogen. Brian participated in the conquest of England. Brian's forces then went north to counter the rebellion by Eadric the Wild, as William the Conqueror's army travelled west; the two armies joined and won the Battle of Stafford. For a time, Brian held the Honour of Brittany, including 227 manors in Cornwall and a number in eastern England. However, he became an invalid and subsequently relinquished all his estates in south-west England (William then gave them to his own half-brother Robert, Count of Mortain), and retired to Brittany to be with his bride. He is recorded as a witness to two documents issued by Geoffrey I Boterel in 1084. Domesday Book entries for the year 1086 refer to "Ralph son of Brian" (http://domesdaymap.co.uk/name/418750/ralph-son-of-brian/) as holding seven properties in Essex and Suffolk, some under the Bishop of London St Paul, the others under Ranulf (Ranulph) Peverel (see William Peverel); to "William son of Brian" (http://domesdaymap.co.uk/name/597200/william-son-of-brian/) as holding land under the Bishop of London St Paul at Great and Little Totham in the Hundred of Thurstable in Essex; to "Everard son of Brian" (http://domesdaymap.co.uk/name/196550/everard-son-of-brian/), whose name is the first listed for the Hundred of Cheveley, as holding land, under Aubrey de Vere I in Ashley and in Saxon [Street], either side of Cheveley; and to "Brian's wife" (http://domesdaymap.co.uk/name/118700/brians-wife/) as holding property under the Bishop of London St Paul in Stepney in the Hundred of Ossulstone in Middlesex. The timing of the lives of Alan Rufus and Stephen of Tréguier suggests that Brian did not hold Richmond. It is reported elsewhere that he was an Earl of Cornwall but resigned the title and returned to Brittany; Brian's lands in England were then granted by King William I to the latter's half-brother Robert, Count of Mortain. During the Anarchy, Alan the Black II claimed Cornwall on the basis of his uncle Brian having held it—a claim that was accepted by King Stephen.)
- Alan Rufus (Latin; alternatively Alain Le Roux in French, or Alan Ar Rouz in Breton, called Count Alan in the Domesday Book, his name means "Red Deer" or "Hart") (d. 1093–98). He promoted trade at Boston, Lincolnshire, built St Mary's Abbey, York, Richmond Castle and the first castle at Middleham, and was effectively the first Earl of Richmond, though the majority of his manors were in East Anglia. Richmondshire in North Yorkshire is described in the Domesday Book as "Terra Alani Comitis" ("The Land of Count Alan") in "Eborakscire" (Yorkshire). In the Rebellion of 1088, he was the first of the great magnates to support William II of England against Odo, Earl of Kent and his allies.
- Alan the Black (alternatively Alain Niger, or Alan Ar Du in Breton, his name means "Black Deer") (d. 1094–98), inherited from Alan Rufus. (Note: Not to be confused with Alan the Black II, the son of Stephen, Count of Tréguier, who also would inherit the Earldom, after Stephen. There is little reliable written documentation of his life save for a record of his death—possibly in the same year as his brother Alan Rufus, as he is believed to have held the Earldom for a very brief period of time before it passed to Stephen.)
- Stephen, Count of Tréguier, married Havise of Guingamp, and succeeded Alan Rufus and Alan the Black as de facto Earl of Richmond. Stephen and Havise had a number of legitimate children and grandchildren, all of whom are ancestors of the current British royal family.
- Robert, a priest in Yorkshire (d. after 1083).
- Richard, a canon of Bayeux at the time when Thomas of Bayeux, Thomas's brother Samson and William de Saint-Calais were also canons there.
- Guillaume or William, who came to Switzerland, entering the service of the Holy Roman Emperor; he was the suppressor of the revolt of Agaunum (today Saint-Maurice-en-Valais), and received a castle in his honour.
- An unnamed daughter, who married Enisandus Musardus de Pleveno who was the Lord of Cheveley in Cambridgeshire (under Alan Rufus as tenant-in-chief), first Constable of Richmond Castle and lord of some twenty manors in Richmondshire. Cheveley was recorded until 1457 as remaining under the overlordship of the Honour of Richmond.

Sons of Eudon who were probably illegitimate include:

- Ribald, who received the Lordship of Middleham from Alan Rufus, was a male-line ancestor of the Ancient House of Neville. (Note: Middleham later passed by marriage and consequent female descent to the House of Neville.)
- Bardolf lord of Ravensworth, who moved to England where he held the lordship of Ravensworth and became the ancestor of the Fitzhugh family.
- Bodin, Lord of Bedale and Didderston and brother of Bardolf.
- (Possibly) Derrien, Lord of La Roche-Derrien in Brittany.

At least two of Eudon's sons (Alan Rufus and Brian) were early participants in the Norman conquest of England.

Eudon's descendants formed the junior branch of the Breton ducal family, which gained control of the duchy in 1156 under his great-grandson Conan IV of Brittany.

== See also ==
- Dukes of Brittany family tree

== Notes ==
Preceded by Geoffrey I	Duke of Brittany; 1008–1034; With: Alan III	Succeeded by Alan III, alone
