= Château de Combourg =

Medieval castle in Combourg, France

Coordinates: 48°24′28″N 1°45′14″W

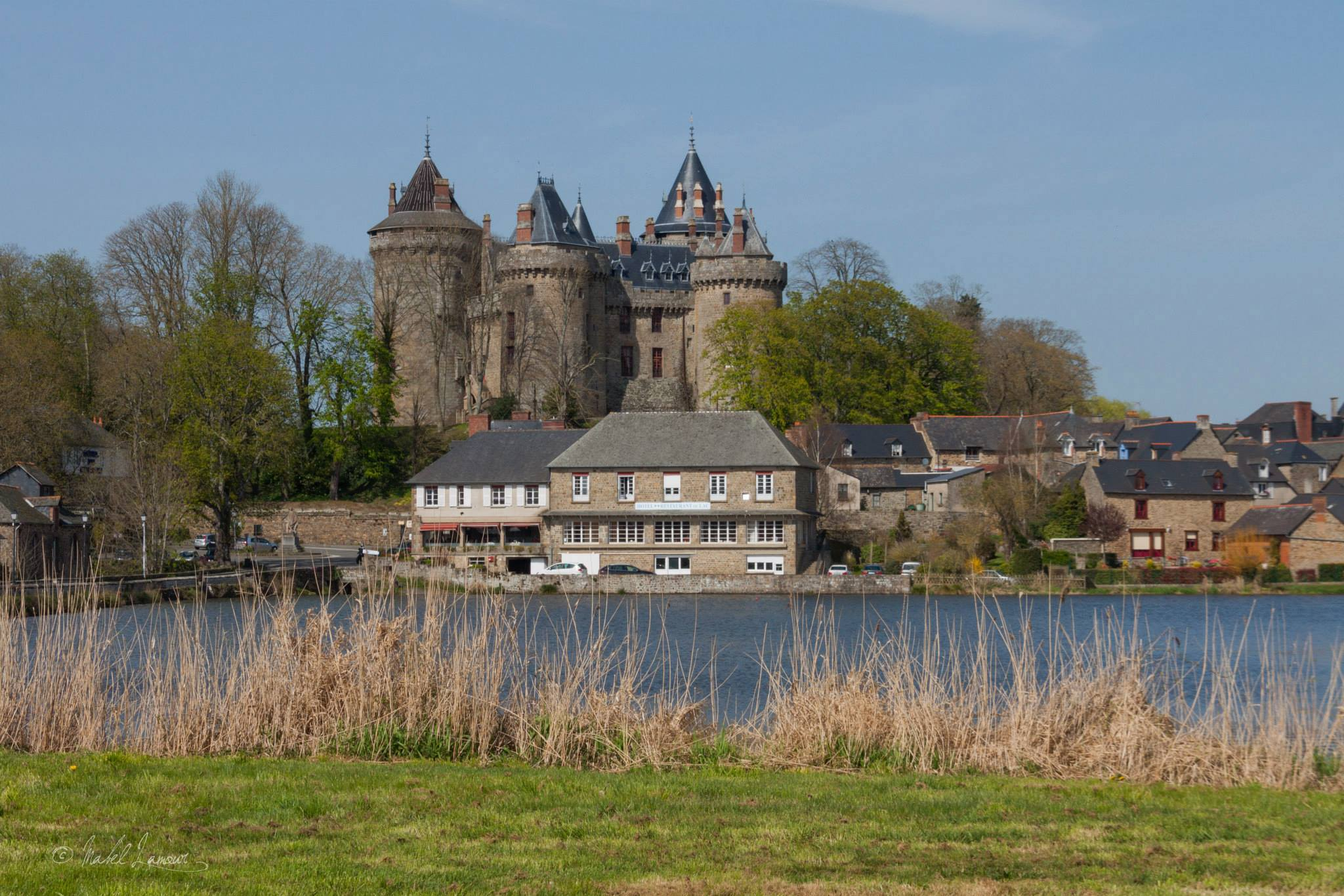
Château de Combourg

Château de Combourg is a medieval castle in the commune of Combourg in the Ille-et-Vilaine département of Brittany, France. The castle stands on a small hill next to Lac Tranquille ("Lake Tranquil") in the town of Combourg.

== History ==
The castle was built around 1025 by Guinguené, the Archbishop of Dol. He gave it to his illegitimate brother Riwallon, the first Lord of Combourg.

The castle was made famous by François-René de Chateaubriand, the renowned French writer and politician, whose family had acquired the property in 1761, and it is where he spent part of his childhood. From his descriptions of the castle, it has come to be considered "the birthplace of Romanticism". Chateaubriand wrote in his Memoirs from Beyond the Grave, "I became what I am in the woods of Combourg."

In 1876, Count Geoffroy de Chateaubriand, grandson of François-René's eldest brother (Jean-Baptiste de Chateaubriand), undertook its restoration. The project was led by a prominent French architect, Eugène Viollet-le-Duc, whose other restorations included the cathedral of Notre Dame de Paris, the abbey of Mont Saint-Michel, the medieval city of Carcassonne, and the castles of Pierrefonds and Vincennes.

Privately owned, the castle is listed as a monument historique by the French Ministry of Culture.

== See also ==
- List of castles in France
