= Battle of Segré =

Coordinates: 47°41′14″N 0°52′15″W

- Part of Breton–Norman War
| Date | 1066 |
| Location | Segré, France |
| Result | Breton victory |

Belligerents
| Duchy of Normandy; Angevin Empire | Duchy of Brittany |

Commanders and leaders
| William, Duke of Normandy; Rivallon I of Dol; Geoffrey III of Anjou | Conan II of Brittany |

The Battle of Segré was a battle between the forces of Conan II, Duke of Brittany, and an alliance of the rebel Rivallon I of Dol, the Angevin Empire, and the Duchy of Normandy, fought as part of the Breton–Norman War. During Conan's 1066 campaign against Anjou, he took Segré.
