= Battle of Pouancé =

1066 battle in Pouancé, France

Coordinates: 47°44′29″N 1°10′30″W

- Part of Breton-Norman War
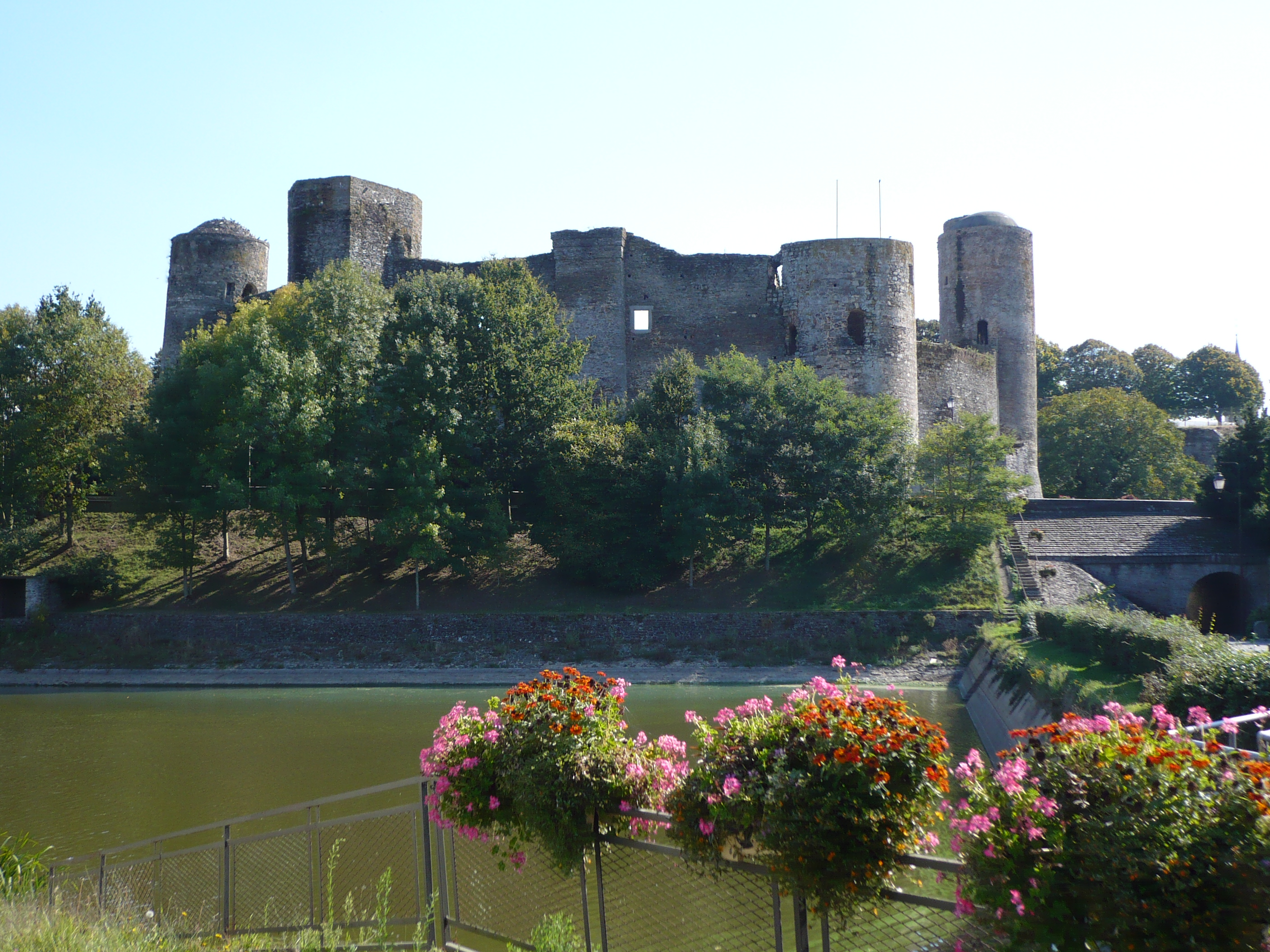
- Pouancé Castle
Date	1066
Location	Pouancé, France
Result	Breton victory

Belligerents
Pouancé	Duchy of Brittany

Commanders and leaders
William, Duke of Normandy; Rivallon I of Dol; Geoffrey III of Anjou	Conan II of Brittany

The Battle of Pouancé was a battle in Conan II of Brittany's campaigns against the rebel Rivallon I of Dol, the Count of Anjou Geoffrey III, and the Duchy of Normandy's ruler, William.

During Conan's 1066 campaign against Anjou, he took Pouancé.
