= Eudes of Brittany =

Eudes of Brittany may refer to:

- Eudes, Count of Penthièvre (c. 999–1079), Duke of Brittany
- Eudes II, Viscount of Porhoët (died 1170), Duke of Brittany
