= Lord of Combourg =

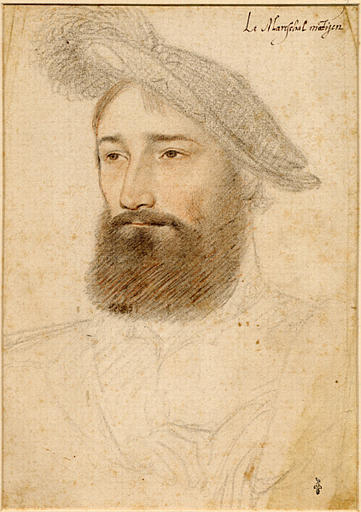
René de Montjean, lord from 1517 to 1539.

The Lordship of Combourg, after 1575 the County of Combourg, was a barony centred on Combourg in the east of the Duchy of Brittany in France during the Middle Ages and the early modern period.

The lordship was created by Junguené, bishop of Dol, before 1040. It originated in fifteen parishes detached from the episcopal régaire, the temporal jurisdiction of the bishopric, for the benefit of Junguené's brother, Riwallon. The latter was invested with it as a fief of the bishopric with the title of signifer Sancti Samsonis, that is, the standard-bearer of Saint Samson, patron of the diocese. Riwallon was thus placed in charge of the defence of the diocese and its régaire. He controlled the tower of Dol and commanded the garrison in the city.

== Lords of Combourg ==
- before 1040–1065 : Riwallon I
- 1065–1079/1083 : John I, son of prec., became a monk and then bishop of Dol from 1087 to 1092
- 1079/1083–after 1100 : Riwallon II, son of prec.
- after 1100–1137 : Gelduin I, brother of prec.
- 1137–1162 : John II, son of prec.
- 1162–1197 : Yseult, daughter of prec., married in 1167 to:

- Hasculf of Soligné, who also held the title of lord of Combourg during her life

- 1197–after 1241 : John III, son of prec.
- died after 1235 : Gelduin II, son of prec.
- died after 1273 : Harscoët, son of prec.
- died after 1278 : John IV, son of prec.
- after 1278–1330 : John V, son of prec.
- 1330–after 1354 : Jeanne (died after 1386), daughter of prec., married to:

1. John (died at the battle of Mauron in 1352), lord of Tinténiac, Bécherel and Romillé in his own right
2. John of Châteaugiron (died 1374), lord of Malestroit

- 1374–1397 : John (II) of Malestroit, son of prec. by no. 2
- 1397–1415 : John (III) of Malestroit, son of prec., died at the battle of Agincourt
- 1415–1463 : Geoffrey of Malestroit, brother of prec.
- 1463–1482 : John (IV) Malestroit, son of prec., also lord of Derval
- 1482–1493 : Françoise of Rieux, grand-niece of prec., granddaughter of Gillette of Malestroit, married to:

- François of Montafilant

- 1493–1506 : Jeanne Raguenel of Malestroit, aunt of prec., daughter of Gillette of Malestroit, married to:

- Tanguy IV du Chastel

- 1506–1517 : Jacques de Montjean, son of Jeanne du Chastel and Louis de Montjean
- 1517–1539 : René de Montjean, brother of prec.
- 1539–1569 : François d'Acigné, nephew of prec., son of Jean d'Acigné and Anne de Montjean
- 1569–1615 : Philippette d'Acigné, daughter of prec., married in 1553 to:

- Jean V de Coëtquen, lord of Combourg from 1569 until 1575

== Counts of Combourg ==
- 1575–1604 : Jean V de Coëtquen
- 1604–1628 : Louis de Coëtquen, grandson of prec., son of Jean de Coëtquen (died 1602)
- 1628–1674 : Malo I de Coëtquen, son of prec.
- 1674–1679 : Malo II de Coëtquen, son of prec.
- 1679–1727 : Malo-Auguste de Coëtquen, son of prec.
- 1727–1734 : Malo-François de Coëtquen, grandson of prec., son of Jules-Malo de Coëtquen (died 1727)
- 1734–1746 : Augustine de Coëtquen, aunt of prec., daughter of Jules-Malo, married in 1735 to:

- Charles, Duke of Rochechouart

- 1734–1761 : Louise-Françoise-Maclovie de Coëtquen, daughter of Malo-Auguste, married in 1739 to:

- Emmanuel-Félicité de Durfort, Duke of Duras, who on 3 May 1761 ceded the county to:

- 1761–1786 : René-Auguste de Chateaubriand
- 1786–1794 : John-Baptiste de Chateaubriand, son of prec., executed at Paris in 1794 during the Reign of Terror
- 1794–1873 : Louis-Geoffroy de Chateaubriand, son of prec.
- 1873–1889 : Christian Marie Camille Geoffroy de Châteaubriand, son of prec.

== Sources ==
- Frédéric Morvan. Les Chevaliers bretons: Entre Plantagenets et Capétiens du milieu XIIe siècle au milieu du XIIIe siècle. Spézet: Éditions Coop Breizh, 2014. ISBN 9782843466700 See the "généalogie des Dol-Combourg" at p. 271.
- Frédéric Morvan. la Chevalerie de Bretagne et la formation de l'armée ducale 1260-1341. Rennes: Presses Universitaires de Rennes, 2009. ISBN 9782753508279 See Généalogie n°18 : les Dol-Combourg".
- Michel Brand'Honneur. Manoirs et châteaux dans le comté de Rennes (XIe-XIIe siècles). Rennes: Presses Universitaires de Rennes, 2001. ISBN 2868475612
- Amédée Guillotin de Corson. Combourg son Histoire-Chateaubriand. Rennes: L'Amateur Averti La Découvrance, 1994. ISBN 2 910 452 11 5
