= Alan Rufus =

Breton nobleman (c. 1040 – 1093)

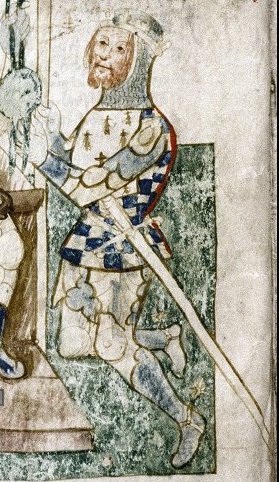
Alan Rufus, from a larger 14th century illumination, swearing fealty to William the Conqueror (Note: Another painting of Alan Rufus from the Register of the Honour of Richmond, this from the latter 15th century, is at the Bodleian archive, and visible on the internet at http://bodley30.bodley.ox.ac.uk:8180/luna/servlet/detail/ODLodl~1~1~47787~127458:Register-of-the-Honour-of-Richmond-)

Alan Rufus, alternatively Alanus Rufus (Latin), Alan ar Rouz (Breton), Alain le Roux (French) or Alan the Red (c. 1040 – 1093), 1st Lord of Richmond, was a Breton nobleman, kinsman and companion of William the Conqueror (Duke William II of Normandy) during the Norman Conquest of England. He was the second son of Count Odo of Penthièvre and Agnes of Cornouaille. (Note: Agnes is thought to be the daughter of Count Alain Canhiart of Cornouaille but genealogical documentation is sparse.) William the Conqueror granted Alan Rufus a significant English fief, later known as the Honour of Richmond, in about 1071.

== Biography ==
Alan Rufus is first mentioned as a witness (along with his mother Orguen and brothers Gausfridus, Willelmus, Rotbertus, Ricardus) to a charter dated to 1056/1060, issued by his father Eozen to the Abbey of Saint-Aubin in Angers (q.v. Albinus of Angers).

Alan already held some property in Rouen, the capital of Normandy, and was lord of Richemont in Upper Normandy before September 1066. In 1066 or 1067, William of Normandy assented to the gift by Alan Comes (i.e. Alan Rufus) to St-Ouen de Rouen of the church of Saint-Sauveur without Rouen, and of the nearby church of Sainte Croix des Pelletiers, which had been his gift to Alan.

Alan was probably present at the Battle of Hastings in October 1066. On the journey to the battle site near Hastings, the Breton forces formed the vanguard, arriving a good half-hour before the rest of William's army. In the battle formation, Bretons are mentioned variously as in the left-wing or in the rear-guard of the army. Geoffrey Gaimar's L'Estoire des Engles and Wace's Roman de Rou both assert Alan Rufus's presence as Breton commander in the battle, (Note: Wace confuses Alan Rufus with his cousin Alan called "Fergant" (French for "Iron-Glove") of Cornouaille (Breton: Kernev), grandson of Conan II, who in 1084 became Alan IV, Duke of Brittany; Fergant was a child in 1066, so even if present he could not have held a leadership position) and praise his contribution: Gaimar says "Alan and his men struck well" and Wace states that they did the English "great damage".

A column of Norman cavalry swept into the Cambridge area in late 1066 and built a castle on the hill just north of the river crossing. Alan's first possessions in England were in Cambridgeshire, so he may have obtained them about this time. The Cambridgeshire town of Bourn, west of Cambridge and due north of London, along with several other towns in the area were according to the Domesday Book held in 1066 by the royal thane Almer of Bourn as a tenant of Edith the Fair. Alan's early acquisitions in England included many land titles that had been in the possession of King Harold's wife Edith the Fair, including all but one of her holdings in Cambridgeshire.) Alan later favored Almer by giving him two additional manors.

In 1067, Alan witnessed a charter of King William to the monks of St Peter's at Westminster.

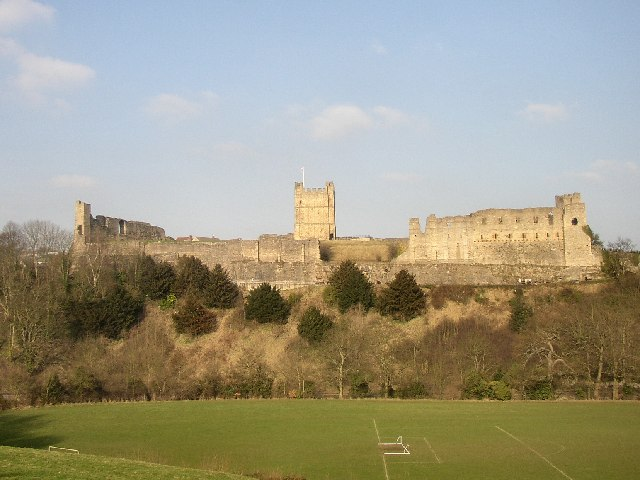
Richmond Castle first built by Alan Rufus

In January 1069, Earl Edwin in Yorkshire and his brother Earl Morcar in Northumberland rebelled. In late 1069, the King brought an army north to combat the rebels and recover York. According to the Register of Richmond, it was at the instigation of Queen Matilda, during the Siege of York, that King William conceded to Alan the Honour of Richmond (the Hundred of the "Land of Count Alan" in Yorkshire) in North Yorkshire. Unusually, within the land of Count Alan, King William himself and his half-brother Robert, Count of Mortain received only one manor each: William sharing one with Alan at Ainderby Steeple, on the eastern fringe of the Land, while Robert held one on its southern edge. The wording of the proclamation is:

Ego Wil(el)mus cognomine Bastardus Rex Anglie do et concedo tibi Nepoti meo Alano Britannie Comiti et heredibus tuis imperpetuum omnes uillas et terras que nuper fuerunt Comitis Edwyni in Eboraschira cum feodis Militum et ecclesiis et aliis libertat(ibus) et consuetudinibus ita libere et honorifice sicut idem Edwinus ea tenuit. Dat(um) in obsidione coram Ciuitate Ebor(aci).

Philemon Holland's English translation of William Camden's "Brittania" (1607) renders the proclamation:

I William surnamed Bastard, King of England, doe give and grant unto thee my Nephew (Note: In fact, both Alan Rufus and Conan II were William's double-second-cousins, as the three fathers (Count Eozen, his brother Duke Alan III and their double-cousin Duke Robert) shared all four grandparents: Conan I, Duke of Brittany, Ermengarde-Gerberga of Anjou, Richard I, Duke of Normandy and Gunnor, Duchess of Normandy.) Alane Earle of Britaine, and to thine heires for ever, all and every the manour houses and lands which late belonged to Earle Eadwine in Yorkeshire, with the knights fees and other liberties and customes, as freely and in as honorable wise as the said Eadwin held the same. Given at our leaguer before the City of Yorke.

Alan Rufus began construction on Richmond Castle in 1071, to be the principal manor and center of his honour. As the first constable of his new castle, Alan chose Enisant Musard, the husband of one of his half-sisters. Richmond Castle overlooks the old Roman fort at Catterick, North Yorkshire. Alan's properties extended over the entire length of Earningas Street, the old Roman road from London to the North, heading to Edinburgh; this road was renamed Ermine Street.

In folklore, Alan has an association with King Arthur: in the tale of Potter Thompson, Arthur and his knights are said to lie at rest under Richmond Castle.

In Richmondshire, the Domesday Book's "Land of Count Alan", many of the Anglo-Dane lords, or their heirs, were retained in their pre-1066 positions of authority. The locations where this was done were complementary to those owned by the deceased Edwin, Earl of Mercia, whereas many of those where Edwin had been Overlord were given to Alan's Breton relatives: his half-brothers Ribald, Lord of Middleham, Bodin, Lord of Bedale, and Bardolf, Lord of Ravensworth, and their wet-nurse, Orwen. (Note: According to a "narratio" in the Sibton Abbey Cartularies (specifically, charter 515 written by John de Gislingham), Orwen came to England after the Norman Conquest and asked Alan to repay her for nourishing him as an infant with her own milk. He responded by giving her Sibton Manor and its estates in coastal Suffolk. Later, Alan's chamberlain Mainard received Alan's permission to marry Orwen; they had two daughters, one of whom, Gemma, was the ancestor of the later lords of Sibton.) Other tenants of Alan in Yorkshire were English lords from East Anglia.

In the 1080s, Alan witnessed several documents of King William in England and Ghent, and one of Queen Matilda in England.

For the period from about 1083-1086 (the exact dates are uncertain) the formidable Sainte-Suzanne Castle was besieged by the king's army. King William I established a fortified camp at Beugy, about 800 metres north of the castle, manned by William's best household knights under the command of Alan Rufus. The siege did not go well, the castle proving to be well-defended. Wealthy Norman and English lords were frequently captured. After a year, Alan handed command to another Breton, who was later slain, along with many of the king's knights, aggrieving William sufficiently to come to terms with the commander of the castle.

It is likely that Alan was with King William I and the other members of the King's Council at Gloucester in Christmas 1085 when they discussed preparations for the extensive survey of England, later known as the Domesday Survey. On this survey was based the Domesday Book, which comprises two volumes, Little Domesday and Great Domesday. (Note: An in-depth study of the writing of the Domesday Book (a summary of the results of this survey) has been conducted by David Roffe)

Through 1086, Alan and Robert of Mortain attended on King William, e.g. at Fécamp in Normandy and in Wiltshire in south-west England.

By 1086 Alan had become one of the richest and most powerful men of England. Alan is mentioned as a lord or tenant-in-chief in 1,017 entries of the Domesday Book, behind only King William I and Robert, Count of Mortain in the number of holdings. The most powerful magnate in East Anglia and Yorkshire, he also possessed property in London, in Normandy (e.g. in Rouen and Richemont), and in Brittany. Alan Rufus is third (not including the King and his immediate family) among the barons in terms of annual income, which was about £1,200. His income in the year of his death, 1093, was £1,100.

Alan donated large sums to a number of religious houses, but most famously founded, with King William II, the Benedictine St Mary's Abbey in York in early 1088.

Alan was among the first four magnates to support William II of England against the Rebellion of 1088 in favour of the Duke of Normandy, Robert Curthose. The uprising was led by the recently freed Odo, Earl of Kent, Bishop of Bayeux, and joined by several major magnates. Beginning in March 1088, Alan was granted additional territory by King William from the confiscated lands of his neighbours who had rebelled. In or before 1089, Alan Rufus issued a charter at Rochester, Kent, Bishop Odo's former principal manor.

William de St-Calais had been in the army led by the king against Bishop Odo, but suddenly fled north to his castle at Durham. After the rebellion was defeated, Roger of Poitou, Alan Rufus, Odo of Champagne, and Walter d'Aincourt were sent to persuade St-Calais to surrender. After a lengthy parley during which they waited outside the castle, St-Calais agreed to surrender his person and stand trial, but only once they signed a complex document promising safe conduct before, during, and after the trial. Alan Rufus played a significant role in the subsequent trial of St-Calais, which commenced on 2 November 1088 at Salisbury in Wiltshire.

Wilmart's interpretation is that in exchange for St-Calais agreeing to submit to the King's judgement, Alan and the other royal officers signed a document guaranteeing St-Calais's safety before and after the trial. (Note: "Alain fut aussi l'un des mandataires du roi, qui, le 8 septembre, signèrent une convention assez compliquée, établie vraisemblablement par l'évêque, aux termes de laquelle la sécurité de Guillaume de Saint-Calais était garantie jusqu'à son jugement, et même au delà, quelle que fût la sentence.") When St-Calais cited this in court, there was uproar, but Alan calmly confirmed St-Calais's statement and then said that if there were any fault here, it was his (Alan's). Alan concluded by begging the king not to attempt to coerce him into committing perjury; otherwise, he (Alan) would believe himself obliged to refuse to serve the king. (Note: "C'est alors que Saint-Calais, prétendant garder la place contre un gage, rappela d'une manière inattendue l'arrangement passé avec le comte Alain. Ainsi mis en cause, et sans se laisser émouvoir par une remarque de Lanfranc ni par les clameurs des laïcs, Alain répéta bravement, dans un discours bref et net, les termes de la convention du 8 septembre. Il avait donné sa parole et entendait la tenir. Sous sa garde, l'évêque était venu de Durham juqu'à la cour du roi, afin de plaider sa cause. Si l'évoque avait la justice pour lauui, Alain devait le ramener sain et sauf à Durham; que si, au contraire, les torts étaient de son côté, on le conduirait de même outre-mer, par Exeter et Sandwich. Quant à lui, Alain, pour conclure, il suppliait son maître de ne le point forcer au parjure; sinon, il se croirait obligé, pour l'avenir, de refuser au roi tout service.")

St-Calais was held in custody at Wilton Abbey until 14 November. Alan escorted St-Calais to Southampton to await passage to Normandy and exile.

According to Christopher Clarkson, in 1089 Count Alan persuaded King William II to convene ("assemble") England's very first "High Court of Parliament" ("under that name") at York.

Saint Anselm, in two letters addressed (perhaps in 1093–1094) to Gunnhild the youngest daughter of King Harold II and Edith the Fair, reprimanded her for abandoning her vocation as a nun at Wilton Abbey to live with Alan Rufus, intending to marry him, and after his death living with his brother Alan Niger ("the Black"). The historian Richard Sharpe has theorised that Matilda d'Aincourt, wife of Walter d'Aincourt, was the natural daughter of Alan Rufus and Gunnhild. In the same article, Sharpe also cited Trevor Foulds's suggestion that Matilda may have been a daughter of King William I and Queen Matilda; although Orderic Vitalis does not mention her name in his list of their daughters, Domesday does name a "Matilda, the King's daughter".

== Death ==
Wilmart thought Alan Rufus's death was sudden and unexpected. (Note: His epitaph implies that his death was a shock as it describes England as "turbatur" because of it.) There are conflicting sources for the year of its occurrence. Two medieval sources (the 12th century Margam Annals and Stephen of Whitby's brief history of St Mary's, York) indicate that he died in 1089 or shortly thereafter, but scholars have concluded that 1093, perhaps on 4 August, is more likely. (Note: The epitaph uses the word "cineratur" to describe Alan's death; he was often in London and the city suffered a major conflagration in 1093.) His body was transported to the abbey at Bury St Edmunds in Suffolk where he was buried in the cemetery outside the south door. Subsequently, his family and the monks of the Abbey of St Mary in York succeeded in their petition to have him reburied inside Bury Abbey.

Alan Rufus died childless. As Lord of Richmond, Alan Rufus was succeeded by his younger brothers: Alan Niger who also died without issue, followed by Stephen, Count of Tréguier.

== Other activities of Count Alan Rufus ==
Beneath Richmond Castle, Alan founded the town of Richmond, North Yorkshire. He also built the original manor house of Costessey Hall, Alan's caput at Costessey in Norfolk, on the north side of the River Tud in Costessey Park.

== Bibliography ==
- Barlow, Frank (1983). William Rufus. University of California Press.
- Clarkson, Christopher (1814). The History of Richmond, in the County of York. Thomas Bowman, Richmond, North Yorkshire, England.
- Dean, Gareth (2008). Medieval York. The History Press. ISBN 978-0752441160.
- Green, Judith A. (2002). The Aristocracy of Norman England. ISBN 9780521524650.
- James, Montague Rhodes (1895). On the Abbey of S. Edmund at Bury: I. The library. II. The church.
- Keats-Rohan, K. S. B. (1991). "The Bretons and Normans of England 1066-1154: the family, the fief and the feudal monarchy" (PDF). Nottingham Medieval Studies. 36: 42–78. doi:10.1484/J.NMS.3.202. Archived from the original (PDF) on 24 July 2011.
- Keats-Rohan, K. S. B. (2004). "Alan Rufus". Oxford Dictionary of National Biography (online ed.). Oxford University Press. doi:10.1093/ref:odnb/52358. (Subscription, Wikipedia Library access or UK public library membership required.)
- Keats-Rohan, Katherine (2012). "Domesday People Revisited".
- Liddiard, Robert, ed. (2003). Anglo-Norman Castles. Boydell Press, Woodbridge, Suffolk, United Kingdom. p. 98. ISBN 9780851159041.
- Mason, J. F. A. (1963). "The 'Honour of Richmond' in 1086". The English Historical Review. 78 (309): 703–704. doi:10.1093/ehr/lxxviii.cccix.703. JSTOR 561220.
- Forrester, Thomas (1854). The Ecclesiastical History of Ordericus Vitalus. Henry G. Bohn, York Street, Covent Garden, London.
- "PASE Domesday".
- "PASE Domesday: Cambridge University connects communities with Domesday". BBC News. 10 August 2010.
- Sharpe, Richard (2007). Stephen Morillo; William North (eds.). "King Harold's Daughter". The Haskins Society Journal. Studies in Medieval History. 19. Boydell and Brewer: 1–27. ISBN 9781843833932.
- Thompson, Pishey (1856). The History and Antiquities of Boston, and the villages of Skirbeck, Fishtoft, Freiston, Butterwick, Benington, Leverton, Leake and Wrangle; comprising the hundred of Skirbeck in the country of Lincoln. Boston, Lincolnshire, England: John Noble, Jnr.
- Wilmart, André (1928). "Alain Le Roux et Alain Le Noir, Comtes de Bretagne" (PDF). Annales de Bretagne. 38 (3): 576–602. doi:10.3406/abpo.1928.4288.

Peerage of England
| New title | Earl of Richmond; 1071–1093 | Succeeded by Alan the Black |
