= Walter D'Aincourt =

Landholder in Derby, England in 1065/1066

Walter D'Aincourt (or Walter Deincourt or d'Eyncourt) was a landholder in Derby under King Edward the Confessor in 1065/1066.

Later in 1066, he fought for William the Conqueror against Harold Godwinson and was rewarded with a large number of manors in a number of counties but particularly Nottinghamshire after the Norman Conquest.

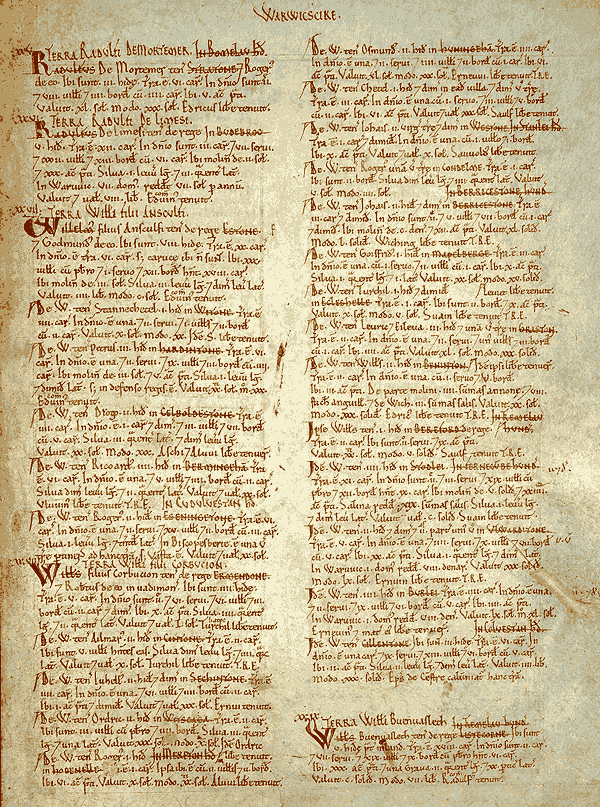
The Domesday Book records 74 manors given to Walter D'Aincourt. This page refers to Warwickshire, as titled at the top.

== Biography ==
D'Aincourt's mark on history is recorded principally in the Domesday Book which records him as tenant-in-chief of thirteen manors in Derbyshire, one manor in Northamptonshire, four in Yorkshire, nineteen in Lincolnshire and thirty-seven in Nottinghamshire. He made his home in Blankney in Lincolnshire.

His surname is said to have had its origin in the village of Aincourt in Normandy on the River Seine between Mantes and Magny.

In 1088, after the Rebellion of 1088, Walter bore a royal writ of William II of England ordering the men of William de St-Calais, Bishop of Durham, to return the cattle that they had stolen from rebels during the conflict.

Walter's first son, William, died young, while in fosterage at the court of King William II "Rufus", and was buried in Lincoln Cathedral, but his other son Ralph lived to become the second Baron Deincourt; his third son was named Walter. Walter (senior) was known to, and described as a blood relative of, Remigius de Fécamp, Bishop of Lincoln who contributed substantially to William I's conquest of England. It has been speculated that D'Aincourt's rewards were due not to his contribution to the conquest but to his kinship of Remigius. However, J.R. Planché believed, on the basis of Walter's son William D'Aincourt being so described on a plaque found in his tomb, that Walter's wife Matilda was of royal descent. On this basis, plus proof that Walter and Matilda made donations on Alan Rufus's behalf, and chronological considerations, Matilda is argued by the historian Richard Sharpe to be a daughter of Count Alan Rufus and of Gunhild of Wessex, and thus a granddaughter of Harold Godwinson, a view that Katharine Keats-Rohan finds convincing (Sharpe's article also cites a suggestion by Trevor Foulds that Matilda d'Aincourt might have been the Princess Matilda who was a daughter of King William the Conqueror and his wife Queen Matilda.)

== Descendants ==
Walter and his wife Matilda had many descendants, such as the later members of the House of Neville, including Warwick the Kingmaker.
