= Hawise of Normandy =

Medieval noblewoman

Hawise
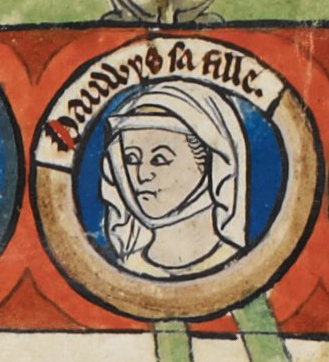
- "Hawise his daughter" (of Richard the Fearless) in BL Royal MS 14 B V
- Died: 21 February 1034
- Spouse: Geoffrey I
- Issue: Alan III of Brittany; Odo, Count of Penthièvre
- House: House of Normandy
- Father: Richard the Fearless
- Mother: Gunnor

Hawise of Normandy (died 21 February 1034) was Countess of Rennes, Duchess of Brittany and Regent to her son Alan III, Duke of Brittany from 1008 until 1026. (Note: Her husband, Geoffrey, Count of Rennes, assumed the title Duke of Brittany in 992 but it was never recognized by the French king at the time and was not formerly legitimized until 1213. See: The New international Encyclopædia, Volume 3 (1918), p. 789.)

== Life ==
Hawise was the daughter of Richard I of Normandy and Gunnor, and was sister of Richard II "the Good", Duke of Normandy as well as Robert, Archbishop of Rouen, Count of Evreux.

=== Duchess of Brittany ===
Hawise and her two sisters all formed important dynastic alliances. Emma of Normandy was twice Queen consort of England marrying firstly Æthelred the Unready and secondly Cnut the Great. Maud of Normandy married Odo II, Count of Blois. And Hawise was a part of an important dynastic double marriage for in 996, she married Geoffrey I, Duke of Brittany, while her brother Richard II, Duke of Normandy shortly afterwards married Geoffrey's sister Judith of Brittany. This double alliance between Normandy and Brittany, probably designed to safeguard both families, certainly functioned as such regarding Brittany.

=== Regency ===
In 1008 when Geoffrey died leaving two young sons, Alan III and Eudo, Richard stepped in to protect them and played a major role in governing Brittany during their minority.

Hawise acted as regent of Brittany during the minority of her son Alan III. In 1010 her regency and the reign of her young son Alan III was seriously challenged by the peasant revolts that had spread from Normandy into Brittany. Alan, encouraged by his mother, led the nobles to quash the rebellion.

Hawise died on 21 February 1034.

== Issue ==
She had four children:

- Alan III of Brittany (997-1040).
- Evenus (c. 998 - aft. 1037).
- Odo, Count of Penthièvre (d. 1079).
- Adela, Abbess of St. Georges.

== Notes ==
Preceded by Ermengarde of Anjou	Duchess consort of Brittany; 996–1008	Succeeded by Bertha of Blois
