= Gunhild of Wessex =

English noble (fl. 1066–1093)

- Princess of England
- Born: before 1066
- Died: after 1093
- Spouse: Alan the Red; Alan the Black
- Issue Detail: Matilda (possible)
- House: Godwin
- Father: Harold Godwinson
- Mother: Edith the Fair

Gunhild of Wessex (fl. 1066–1093) was a younger daughter of Harold Godwinson and his first wife, Edyth Swannesha, who was most likely the wealthy magnate Edyth the Fair from the Domesday Book.

== Early life ==
Gunhild remained in England after her father's death at the Battle of Hastings in 1066 and following in the footsteps of her aunt, Edith of Wessex, received her education at Wilton Abbey. A centre of learning, the Wilton Abbey attracted many highborn women, English and Norman alike. Matilda of Scotland was educated here, with her sister Mary. It was also the home of the poet Muriel. It is possible Gunhild learned French here.

According to the Vita Wulfstani, while still living at Wilton as an adult, Gunhild began to go blind. St Wulfstan heard about her while visiting and made the sign of the cross before her eyes, at which she was healed. According to Elizabeth Tyler, she is depicted as an ordinary member of the convent and while her original entry into the abbey might have been a political move by her father with the intention of making her the abbess. In post-conquest England, religious life was not as advantageous for either Wilton Abbey or the princesses. This might explain why Gunhild entered the secular sphere with the Norman nobility instead.

== Elopement ==
Gunhild left the abbey in 1093 and eloped with Alan the Red, one of the richest men in the kingdom of England according to the Domesday book in 1086. The reason why Alan chose Gunhild might be to legitimize his claim to extensive lands previously owned by her mother, Edgyth the Fair, which Alan held part of. Another possibility includes love: Anselm of Canterbury addressed two letters to Gunhild and in one of them states that she and Alan the Red loved each other. However, Anselm mostly argue that although she had not been consecrated as a nun, she had stated her intention to lead a religious life and so should now return "the nun's habit". She replied that she had stated this intention because she had been promised an abbacy, and that this promise not being fulfilled, she was under no obligation to return. After Alan the Red's death shortly after the elopement in 1093, Gunhild settled with his brother Alan the Black, who was heir to his brother's vast estates. The last mentioning of her comes in the second letter Anselm wrote to her to refute her previous arguments and urge her again to return to Wilton. Gunhild died some time after 1094 and may have predeceased her second husband, Alan the Black.

== Issue ==
No records of descendants remain, but the historian Richard Sharpe argued that Alan the Red and Gunhild had a daughter named Matilda, who was the wife of Walter D'Aincourt. He bases his argument on Matilda's donations to St Mary's Abbey including land previously owned by Alan the Red and Edgyth the fair.
