= World's longest cricket marathon =

Blunham Cricket Club holds the longest cricket game

The world's longest cricket marathon, or the longest marathon playing cricket, is a world record of the longest time continuously playing the game of cricket between two teams.

It is held by Blunham Cricket Club from Bedfordshire England. In 2018 Club broke the world record by playing continuous cricket for 168 hours.

It was previously held by Blunham Cricket Club from Bedfordshire in England. The club played for 105 hours from 10am Thursday 26 August 2010 until stumps were drawn at 7pm on Monday 30 August 2010. Guinness World Records ratified the attempt on 8 April 2011. The club played in pink and purple to highlight cancer charities for both men and women.

== List of record holders ==
The following is a list of record holders that have been accepted and ratified by Guinness World Records, or attempts that are awaiting ratification.

Record holder	Location	Country	Time set	Dates	Notes	Refs
Cricket Club des Ormes	Dol-de-Bretagne, Brittany	France	26 hours 15 minutes	21–22 June 2003	Original official record	
Cheriton Fitzpaine Cricket Club	Devon	United Kingdom	27 hours 34 minutes	24–25 June 2006	Ratified 19 September 2006	
Citipointe Church/Global Care	Brisbane	Australia	33 hours 30 minutes	10–11 June 2006		
Red Row Cricket Club	Northumberland	United Kingdom	34 hours	26–27 May 2007		
Chestfield Cricket Club	Kent	United Kingdom	35 hours	8–9 September 2007		
Citipointe Church	Brisbane	Australia	50 hours 18 minutes	20–22 March 2008		
Cornwall Cricket Club	Auckland	New Zealand	55 hours			
Blunham Cricket Club	Bedfordshire	United Kingdom	59 hours 33 minutes	19–21 September 2008	Ratified 3 December 2008	
Raymond Terrace District Cricket Club	New South Wales	Australia	66 hours 16 minutes	24–27 January 2009	Ratified May 2009	
New South Wales Police Force	New South Wales	Australia	67 hours 9 minutes	8–11 February 2009		
Cornwall Cricket Club	Auckland	New Zealand	100 hours	3–7 January 2010	Ratified 29 July 2010	
Blunham Cricket Club	Bedfordshire	United Kingdom	105 hours	26–30 August 2010	Ratified 8 April 2011	
Loughborough University Staff Cricket Club	Leicestershire	United Kingdom	150 hours 14 minutes	24–30 June 2012	Ratified 19 February 2014	
Blunham Cricket Club	Bedfordshire	United Kingdom	168 hours 20 minutes	24–31 August 2019	Current record	

== Rules ==
The record is the amount of cumulative playing time, after breaks are discounted, of a continuous game of cricket.

- Breaks are limited to 5 minutes per 1 hour of playing time
- There are two teams and these teams are limited to 12-a-side (11 on the field plus one "sub")
- No player is permitted to leave the ground unless they are incapacitated
- A break is not permitted between innings.
