= Bertha of Blois =

Duchess consort of Brittany

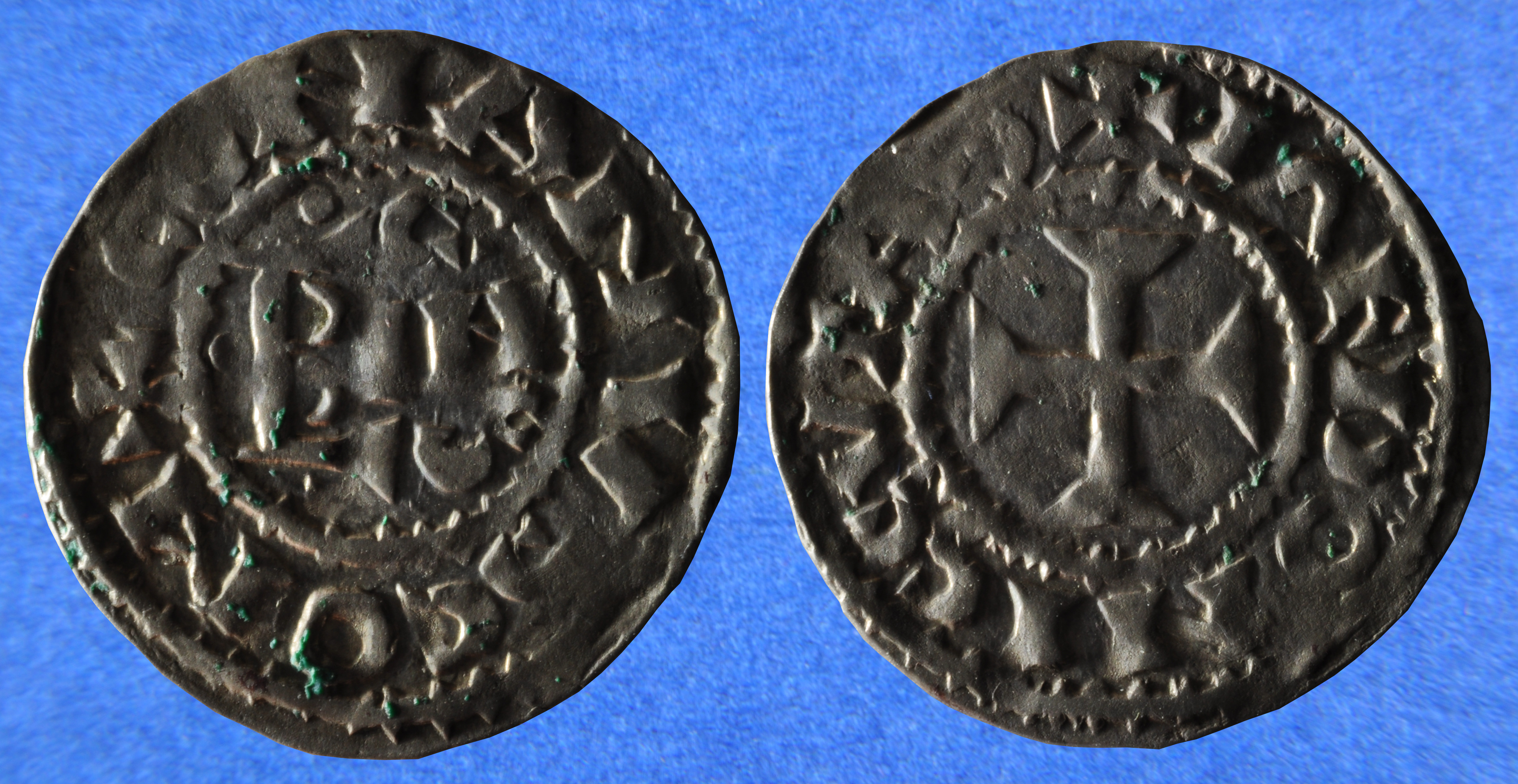
Berthaʻs son Conan II, Duke of Brittany's coins.

Bertha of Blois (French: Berthe de Blois; c. 1005 — c. 1080), was a Duchess consort of Brittany and a countess consort of Maine.

== Life ==
Bertha was the daughter of Odo II, Count of Blois and Ermengarde of Auvergne. In 1029, she married Alain III, Duke of Brittany, he died in 1040. In 1046, she married Hugh IV, Count of Maine.

== Marriage & issue ==
Bertha and Alain had two children:

- Conan II, Duke of Brittany
- Hawise, Duchess of Brittany

With her second husband, Hugh IV, Count of Maine, Bertha had two children:

- Herbert II, Count of Maine
- Marguerite (1045 - 1063), betrothed to Robert Curthose

== Sources ==
- Crouch, David (2007). The Normans. Hambledon Continuum.
- Douglas, David Charles (1966). William the Conqueror. University of California Press.
- Evergates, Theodore, ed. (1999). Aristocratic Women in Medieval France. University of Pennsylvania Press.
- Hagger, Mark S. (2017). Norman Rule in Normandy, 911-1144. The Boydell Press.
- Warren, Wilfred Lewis (1973). Henry II. University of California Press.

Preceded by Hawise of Normandy	Duchess consort of Brittany; 1018–1040	Succeeded by Constance of Normandy
Preceded by Rothilde	Countess consort of Maine; 1046–1051	Succeeded by Eria of Hauteville
