= Château de Dinan =

Castle in France

Coordinates: 48°27′00″N 2°02′41″W

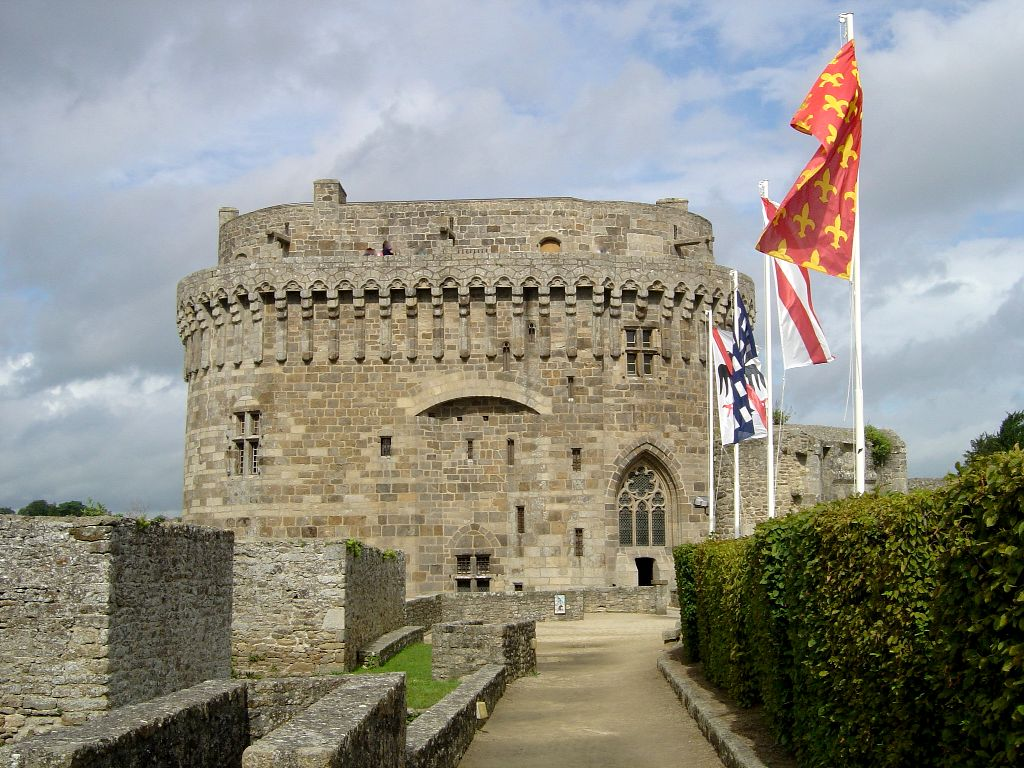
The keep from the top of the ramparts

The Château de Dinan, also known as Dinan Castle, consists of a keep, in the town of Dinan, in the Côtes-d'Armor département of the Brittany region of France.

== History ==
=== First castle ===
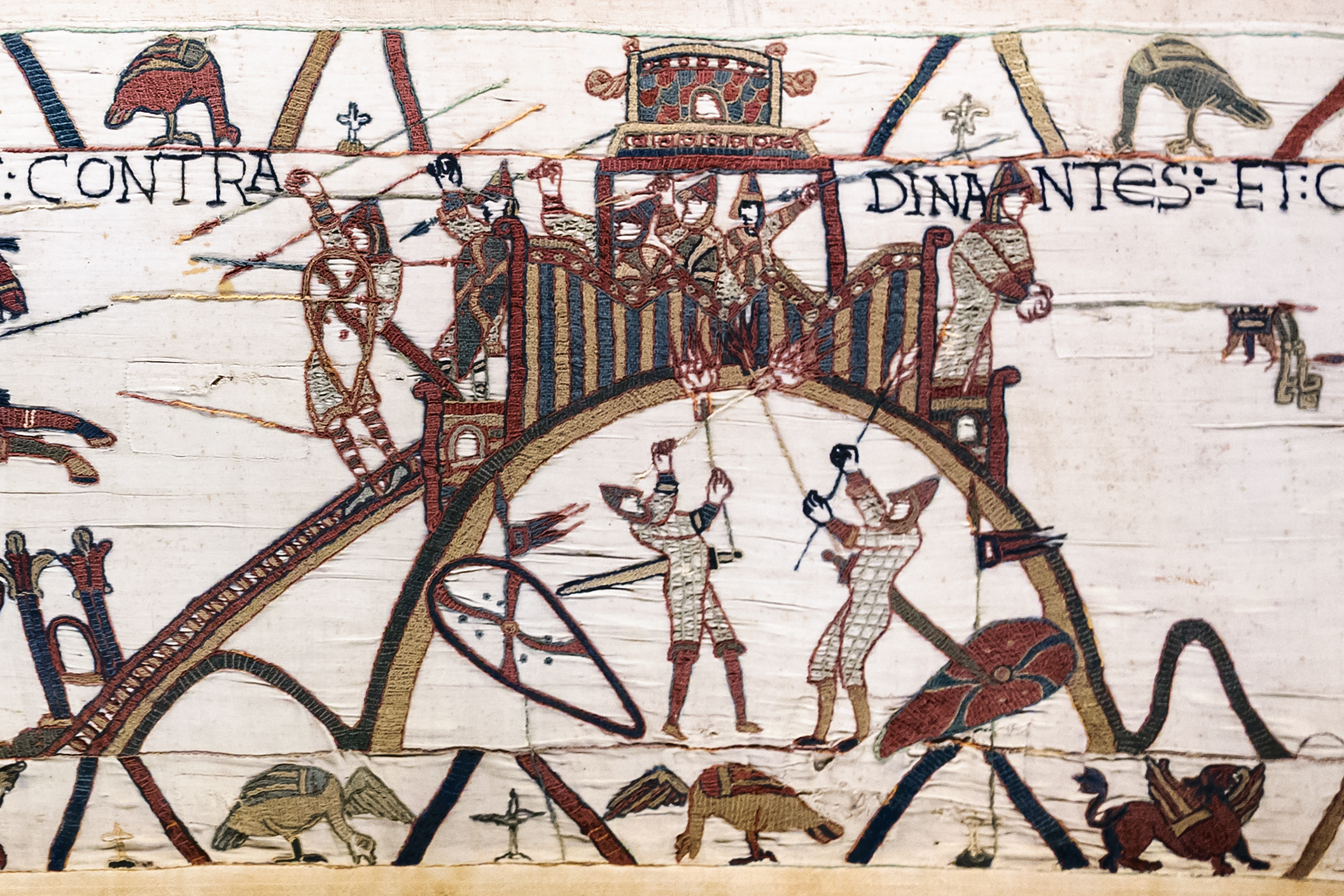
The Château de Dinan during the Battle of Dinan in 1065, as depicted on the Bayeux Tapestry

The first building known as the Château de Dinan was present by 1064, making it one of the earliest known castles as evidenced by the fact that it appeared in the Bayeux Tapestry. The Battle of Dinan was fought at the Château de Dinan in 1065, when Conan II, Duke of Brittany surrendered to the army of Harold Godwinson.

Its defences were fortified in 1283 and underwent upgrades until the end of the War of the Breton Succession in 1365.

=== Second castle ===
In 1382, John V, Duke of Brittany seized the previous castle from the Dinan family, and Etienne le Tur built the current keep in 1382–3; it was in use by 1384.

The castle was then enlarged between 1595–98 by Philippe Emmanuel, Duke of Mercœur after annexing the Porte du Guichet and the Tour de Coëtquen, and the castle was subsequently altered by Garanjeau, a military engineer, between 1693–1711.

The castle was listed for protection as a monument historique in 1886. It is owned by the commune and houses the local museum.

== Description ==
It is called Donjon de la duchesse Anne (Keep of the Duchess Anne), and stands 111 feet (34 m) high near the Saint Louis gate.

The keep is formed by a union of two tall circular towers; a moat and drawbridge divides the keep from the outside of the ramparts as well as from the inside of the city, providing a stronghold both against outsiders and from the townspeople themselves. Extensive machicolations overhang the wall head providing defensive coverage of the base of the tower.

The keep and the gate are part of the 2,600 metres (8,500 ft) of medieval ramparts which still surround the old town.

== See also ==
- List of castles in France
- Chateau
- Basilica of Saint-Sauveur, Dinan.
