= Alan the Black =

Breton noble (d. 1098)

Alan the Black (Latin: Alanus Niger, French: Alain le Noir; died 1098) was the second lord of the Honour of Richmond from 1093 until his death. He was a younger son of Odo, Count of Penthièvre. He succeeded his elder brother, Alan Rufus ("Alan the Red"), at Richmond. There is no record of him being in England prior to 1093.

Alan either had an affair with, or was married to, the nun Gunnhild of Wilton Abbey, a daughter of King Harold II. Gunnhild had earlier eloped with his elder brother. There is contemporary documentation that after the death of Alan Rufus in 1093, Gunnhild lived with Alan the Black. Before this, there is no record of Alan having any wife; there is no record of children. He was succeeded at Richmond by another brother, Stephen, Count of Tréguier.
