= Geoffrey I of Brittany =

Duke of Brittany

Geoffrey I
- Duke of Brittany
- Born: c. 980; Rennes, County of Rennes, Duchy of Brittany
- Died: 20 November 1008; Nantes, Loire-Atlantique, Pays de la Loire, France
- Burial: Brittany
- Spouse: Hawise
- Issue: Alan III, Duke of Brittany; Odo, Count of Penthièvre
- House: House of Rennes
- Father: Conan I, Duke of Brittany
- Mother: Ermengarde-Gerberga of Anjou

Geoffrey I (c. 980 – 20 November 1008), also known as Geoffrey of Rennes and Geoffrey Berengar, was Duke of Brittany from 992 until his death, and also Count of Rennes (ruler of the Romano-Frankish civitas of Rennes) by right of succession. The eldest son of Duke Conan I of Brittany, he assumed the title of Duke of Brittany upon his father's death in 992. Brittany had long been an independent state, but he had little control over much of Lower Brittany. (Note: Geoffrey, Count of Rennes, assumed the title Duke of Brittany in 992. Brittany was not then part of the emerging Kingdom of France, but earlier Dukes had paid homage to the kings of the fledgling French state. By the time of Count Geoffrey's reign, his claim to suzerainty over all of Brittany was weak, and he had virtually no control over western Brittany and Nantes.)

== Life ==
Geoffrey was the son of Duke Conan I, by his marriage to Ermengarde-Gerberga of Anjou. He was the grandson of Judicael Berengar, Count of Rennes.

When Geoffrey succeeded to Brittany he had several problems:

- Blois was encroaching on his territory,
- Vikings were threatening his shores, and
- He had to decide whether to accept the protection offered by Anjou.

=== Norman alliance ===
In 996, at about the age of sixteen, Geoffrey entered into a dynastic alliance with Richard II, Duke of Normandy, with a diplomatic double marriage between the two houses. The church-sanctioned marriage ceremonies were held at Mont Saint-Michel, on the Breton-Norman border, and while Geoffrey married Hawise of Normandy, daughter of Richard I of Normandy and sister of Richard II. Richard married Judith of Brittany, Geoffrey's sister.

Geoffrey and Hawise had four children:

- Alan III of Brittany (997-1040)
- Evenus (born c. 998, died after 1037)
- Odo, Count of Penthièvre (died 1079)
- Adela, Abbess of Saint-Georges

=== Death ===
Geoffrey died on 20 November 1008 while travelling on a pilgrimage to Rome.

== Sources ==
- Bachrach, Bernard S. (1993). Fulk Nerra, the neo-Roman consul, 987-1040: A Political Biography of the Angevin Count. University of California Press.
- Cokayne, George Edward (1945). Doubleday, H. A.; White, Geoffrey H.; de Walden, Howard (eds.). The Complete Peerage; or, A History of the House of Lords and All its Members from the Earliest Times. Vol. X. The St Catherine Press, Ltd.
- Keats-Rohan, K.S.B. (1992). "The Bretons and Normans of England 1066–1154: the Family, the Fief and the Feudal Monarchy". Nottingham Medieval Studies. 36(Jan). Brepols: 42–78.
- Palgrave, Francis (1864). The History of Normandy and of England. Vol. III. Macmillan & Co.
- Smith, Julia M.H. (1995). "Brittany". In Kibler, William W. (ed.). Medieval France: An Encyclopedia. Garland Publishing.

== See also ==
- Dukes of Brittany family tree

Geoffrey I of Brittany House of Rennes Born: 980 Died: 20 November 1008
Regnal titles
Preceded by Conan I	Duke of Brittany; 992–1008	Succeeded by Alan III & Odo I
Preceded by Conan I	Count of Rennes; 992–1008	Succeeded by Alan III
