= Rivallon I of Dol =

Rivallon I of Dol (died c. 1065) was the first lord of Combourg from before 1040. He was born to Hamo I, Viscount of Alet and Roianteline. Rivallon's eldest brother was Hamo II Viscount of Alet, while his next eldest brother Josselin became the seigneur of Diana. Another brother, Jungeon, became Archbishop of Dol. Rivallon also had a sister Imogen who was married to a knight of Alan III of Brittany -- a man she completely dominated, becoming the eventual guardian of their son Brien. Hamo I also had a natural son Saloman who was the given the fief of Garclip later known as the seigneurie of Du Guseclin.

Rivallon married Aremburga du Puiset, the daughter of Evrard, Count of Breteuil. (Note: Evrard he was also the viscount of Chartres and Lord of Le Puiset).) He died around 1065.

== Dol rebels against Conan II ==
Rivallon was influenced by William the Conqueror, the Duke of Normandy.

In this period, Normandy and Brittany clashed with each other in border skirmishes. Before William had become Duke, the Breton tribal lands of the Cotentin Peninsula near Dol had been ceded to Norman rule. When Duke Alan III of Brittany died in 1040, he left Brittany to his infant son Conan II with his younger brother Odo of Penthievre acting as Conan's Regent. Odo challenged Conan II by refusing to relinquish rule on Conan's achieving his majority. Conan could not affirm his rule as Duke until he managed to imprison Odo in 1057.

In 1065 William, as Duke of Normandy convinced Rivallon to rebel against Conan II, Duke of Brittany with the aid of Geoffrey III of Anjou. This rebellion was the first major conflict of the Breton-Norman War.

== Family ==
Rivallon I and Aremburga du Puset had four children:

- Saint Gilduin (d. 1077),
- John, Archbishop of Dol
- Bertha, Countess of Rennes
- William, Abbot of Saint Florent

Geoffroi, the youngest son of Rivallon, took the surname of Gorron, Gorram. His son Ruellon de Gorram married Hersende daughter of Walter de Mayenne.

Rivallon had another son, Richard, that is not well known. Geoffroy appears to be the youngest. He has been connected with the family of Gorron. Geoffroy's children have been identified as the Lord of Saint Berthevin La Tanniere, Hemenare, l'Ernee, Levare and Buron.
