= Alan III of Brittany =

Duke of Brittany from 1008 to 1040

Alan III
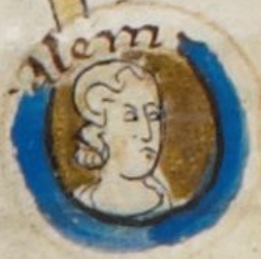

Duke of Brittany
- Reign: 20 November 1008 – 1 October 1040
- Predecessor: Geoffrey I
- Successor: Conan II
- Regent: Hawise of Normandy (Regent 1008–1026)
- Born: c. 997
- Died: 1 October 1040; Vimoutiers
- Spouse: Bertha of Blois
- Issue: Conan II, Duke of Brittany; Hawise, Duchess of Brittany
- House: Rennes
- Father: Geoffrey I, Duke of Brittany
- Mother: Hawise of Normandy

Alan III (c. 997 – 1 October 1040) was count of Rennes and duke of Brittany from 1008 to his death.

Alan was the son of Geoffrey I of Brittany and Hawise of Normandy. He succeeded his father in 1008. Because he was still a minor at his father's death, his mother acted as regent of Brittany while her brother Richard II, Duke of Normandy assumed guardianship over Brittany. In 1018 Alan married Bertha of Blois. They had a son, Conan II, and a daughter, Hawise.

When Duke Richard III of Normandy died in August 1026, his brother Robert I succeeded him. Alan apparently took advantage of the resulting turmoil to break free of Norman suzerainty. In the early 1030s Robert I successfully attacked Dol and Alan's retaliatory raid on Avranches was repulsed causing continued raiding back and forth between them. Facing an invasion from Normandy via land and from Duke Robert's fleet, Archbishop Robert of Rouen (uncle of Hawise and Richard) mediated a truce between his two great-nephews at Mont Saint-Michel where Alan swore fealty to his cousin Robert. When he left Normandy for the Holy Land, Robert appointed Alan to be a guardian of his young son William. (Note: Among the guardians Duke Robert chose to watch over his son William were at least three family members. Alan III was probably selected as both a family member and one who would not be expected to compete with young William. Count Gilbert of Brionne was another grandson of Richard I who could be counted on for military support to aid William. Also the senior member of the family was Archbishop Robert who lent his powerful support to the young Duke William. See: Crouch, The Normans (2007). p. 60.)

Alan III also assisted Count Herbert I of Maine in his wars with Avesgaud, bishop of Le Mans, and was with the count in his attack on Avesgaud's castle at La Ferté-Bernard destroying the castle and causing Avesgaud to flee.

In 1037, upon the death of Archbishop Robert, the protection of William was left to Alan and Gilbert, who tentatively held Normandy together. They appointed Mauger to the now vacant see of Rouen and his brother William as count of Arques, attempting to gain their support for Duke William.

On 1 October 1040, while besieging a rebel castle near Vimoutiers in Normandy, Alan III suddenly died. According to Orderic, he was poisoned by unnamed Normans. (Note: Not long after the last of young Duke William's three powerful guardians, Gilbert 'Crispin' Count of Brionne, was himself assassinated while riding with friends. See: Crouch, The Normans (2007), p. 61; and Cokayne, The Complete Peerage IV, pp. 308–9.)

== Notes ==
Alan III of Brittany House of Rennes Born: 997 Died: 10 October 1040
Regnal titles
Preceded by Geoffrey I	Duke of Brittany; Count of Rennes; 1008–1040	Succeeded by Conan II
