= Combourg =

Combourg Conbórn (Gallo) Komborn (Breton)
- Commune
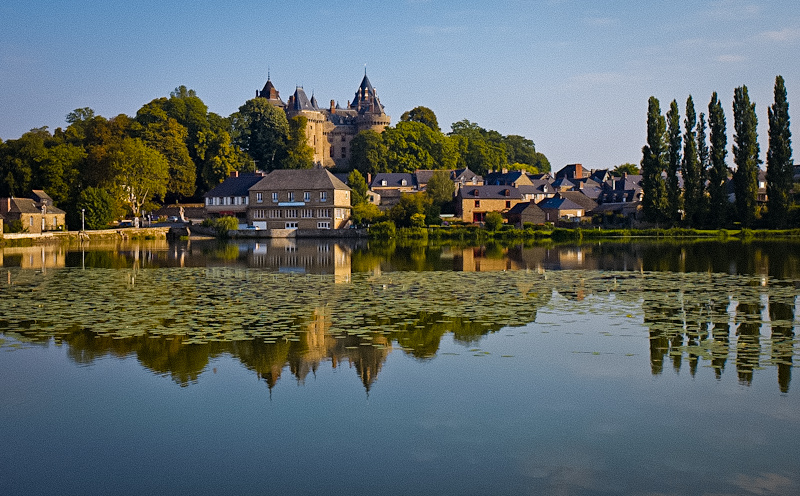
- Château de Combourg

- Flag Coat of arms
- Location of Combourg
- Location within France Location within Brittany
- Coordinates: 48°24′34″N 1°45′02″W
- Country: France
- Region: Brittany
- Department: Ille-et-Vilaine
- Arrondissement: Saint-Malo
- Canton: Combourg
- Intercommunality: Bretagne Romantique

Government
  - Mayor (2020–2026): Joël Le Besco
- Area^{1}: 63.55 km^{2} (24.54 sq mi)
- Elevation: 66 m (217 ft)
- Highest elevation: 120 m (390 ft)
- Lowest elevation: 29 m (95 ft)
- Population (2023): 6,411
  - Density: 100.9/km^{2} (261.3/sq mi)
- Time zone: UTC+01:00 (CET)
  - Summer (DST): UTC+02:00 (CEST)
- INSEE/Postal code: 35085 /35270
- ^{1} French Land Register data, which excludes lakes, ponds, glaciers > 1 km^{2} (0.386 sq mi or 247 acres) and river estuaries.

Combourg (French pronunciation: [kɔ̃buʁ]; Breton: Komborn; Gallo: Conbórn) is a commune in the Ille-et-Vilaine department in Brittany in northwestern France.

== History ==
The town is part of the Patrimoine Urbain de Bretagne and labelled as one of the Petites Cités de Caractère. Combourg is considered the "cradle of Romanticism" in French literature due to the renowned French writer François-René de Chateaubriand who spent part of his youth in his family's castle, the Château de Combourg. He describes the village and medieval castle in his Memoirs from Beyond the Grave.

Combourg is located between the cities of Rennes and Saint-Malo in Brittany. It is approximately 386 km from Paris, 39 km from Rennes and 36 km from Saint-Malo.

== Administration ==
=== Mayors ===
The current mayor of Combourg is Joël Le Besco (Miscellaneous right). He replaced Marie-Thérèse Sauvée (Socialist) in office from 1995 to 2001.

- André Belliard (1932-2005), RPR mayor from 1971 to 1977 and from 1983 to 1995;
- Joseph Hubert son (1921-1994), Centre-left mayor from 1970 to 1971 and from 1977 to 1983;
- Abel Bourgeois (1904-1970), Radical-Socialist mayor from 1945 to 1970 (resignation).

Among previous well-known mayors are:

- Émile Bohuon (1880-1938), Independent Radical mayor from 1919 to 1938 (death);
- Valentin Cutté (1854-1936), Republican mayor from 1903 to 1919;
- Gervais Parent (1852-1913), from 1885 to 1900;
- Victor Thomas (1832-1885), from 1876 to 1877, in 1878 and from 1880 to 1885;
- Jean Gesbert de la Noë-Seiche (1748-1828), first mayor of Combourg in 1790.

== Population ==
Inhabitants of Combourg are called Combourgeois and, more rarely Combournais, in French.

Historical population

Year	Pop.	±% p.a.
1800	4,170	—
1901	5,204	+0.22%
1962	4,339	−0.30%
1968	4,457	+0.45%
1975	4,647	+0.60%
1982	4,733	+0.26%

Year	Pop.	±% p.a.
1990	4,843	+0.29%
1999	4,850	+0.02%
2007	5,401	+1.35%
2012	5,739	+1.22%
2017	5,940	+0.69%
2023	6,411	+1.28%

Source: EHESS and INSEE (1968-2023)

== Personalities ==
François-René de Chateaubriand (1768–1848), known as the father of Romanticism in French literature, spent his childhood in his family's castle, the Château de Combourg.

== International relations ==
Combourg is twinned with Waldmünchen, in Bavaria, Germany.

== Gallery ==
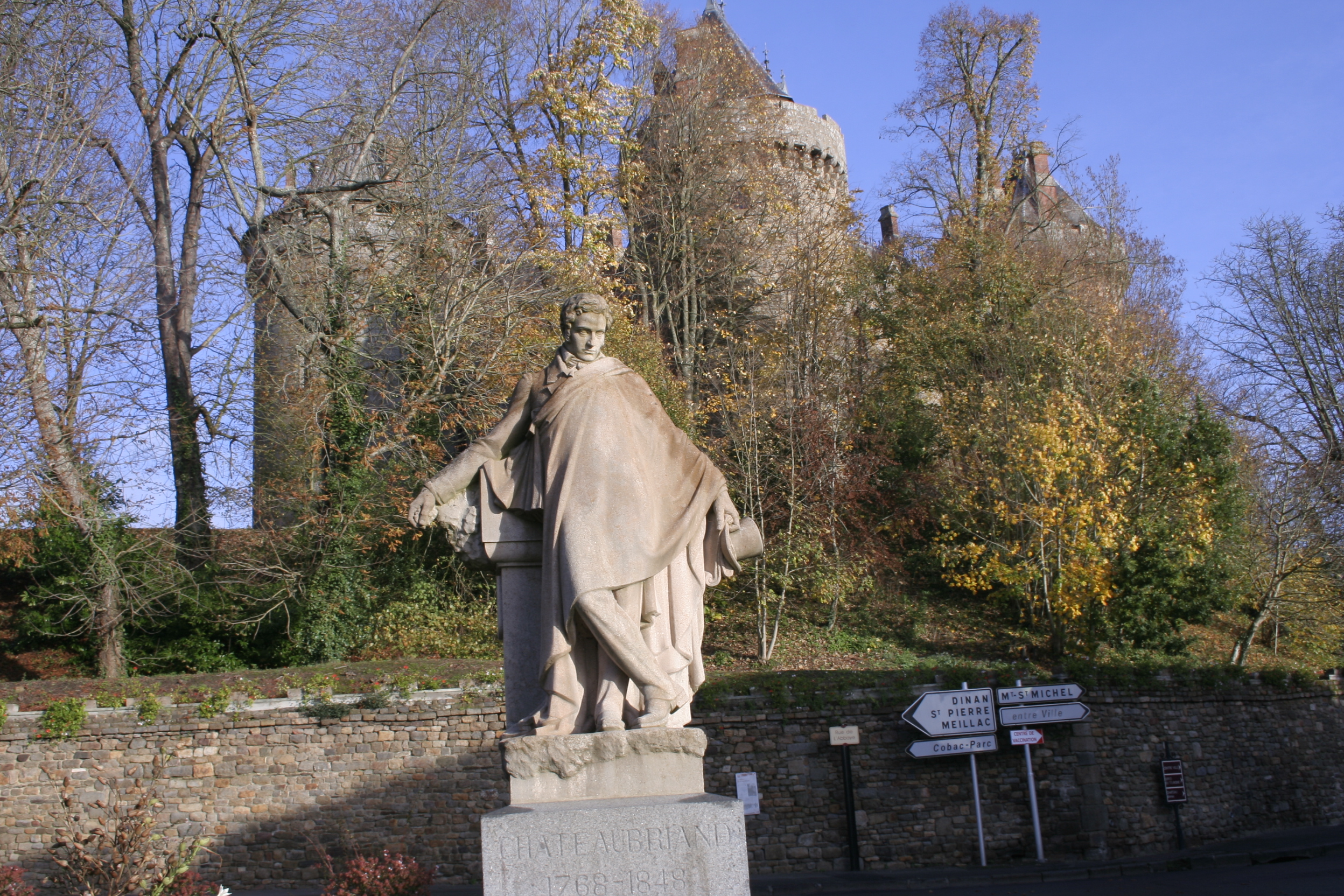
Place Chateaubriand

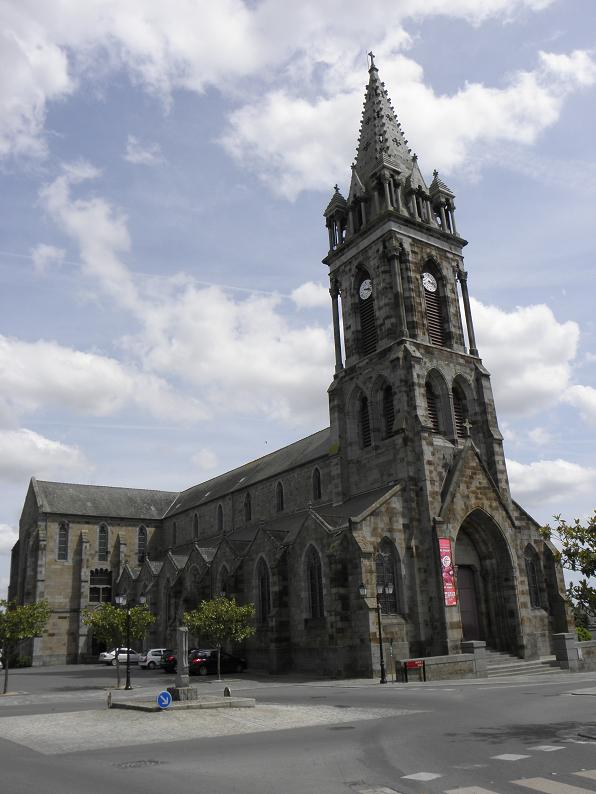
Notre-Dame church of Combourg

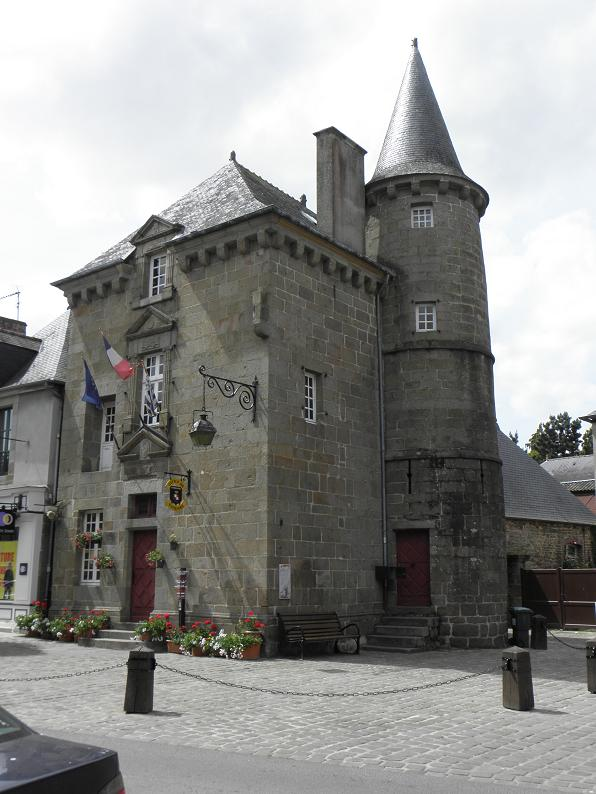
Maison de la Lanterne

== See also ==
- Château de Combourg
- Communes of the Ille-et-Vilaine department
