= Breton–Norman war =

Medieval war in France (1064–1066)

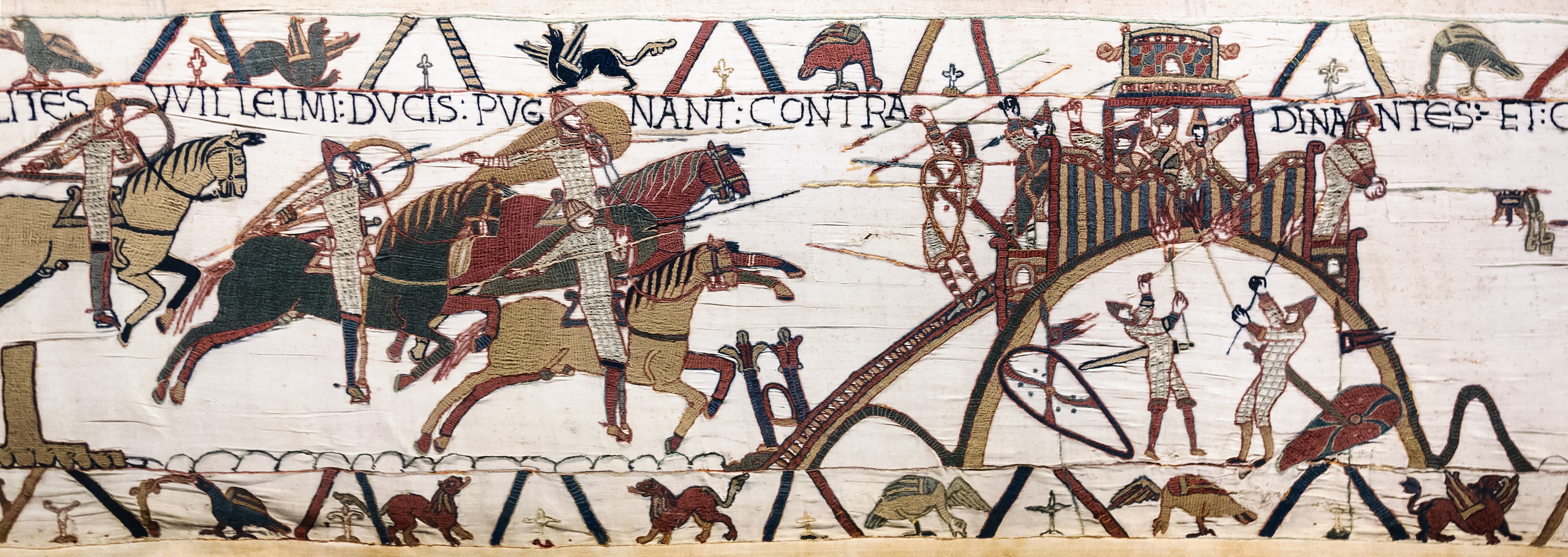
- "Here the knights of Duke William fight against the men of Dinan; and Conan passed out the keys". Two successive scenes from the contemporary Bayeux Tapestry (c.1066) depicting the Battle of Dinan, one of the decisive battles of the war.
Date	1064–1066
Location	Château de Dinan, Brittany
Result	Stalemate

Belligerents
Duchy of Normandy; Kingdom of England	Duchy of Brittany

Commanders and leaders
Harold Godwinson; William II, Duke of Normandy; Rivallon I of Dol-Combourg	Conan II of Brittany

The Breton–Norman war of 1064–1066 was fought between the sovereign Duchy of Brittany and the Duchy of Normandy.

Brittany, an independent Celtic duchy, had a traditional rivalry with neighboring Normandy.

== Neighboring rivals ==
The 1064–1065 animosity between Brittany and Normandy was sparked after William the Conqueror, as Duke of Normandy, supported a Breton, Rivallon I of Dol's rebellion against the hereditary Duke of Brittany, Conan II.

In 1065, the year before his invasion of Anglo-Saxon England, William of Normandy sent word to the surrounding countries (including Brittany), warning them against attacking his lands while he was away, on the grounds that his mission bore the papal banner. However, Duke Conan promptly informed the Norman Duke that he would take the opportunity to invade the latter's Duchy.

=== Loss of Breton lands ===
Duke William's army therefore set out to appease the Breton threat. While outside the monastery of Mont Saint-Michel, two Norman soldiers became mired in quicksand. Harold Godwinson, the Earl of Wessex and future King of England, saved them.

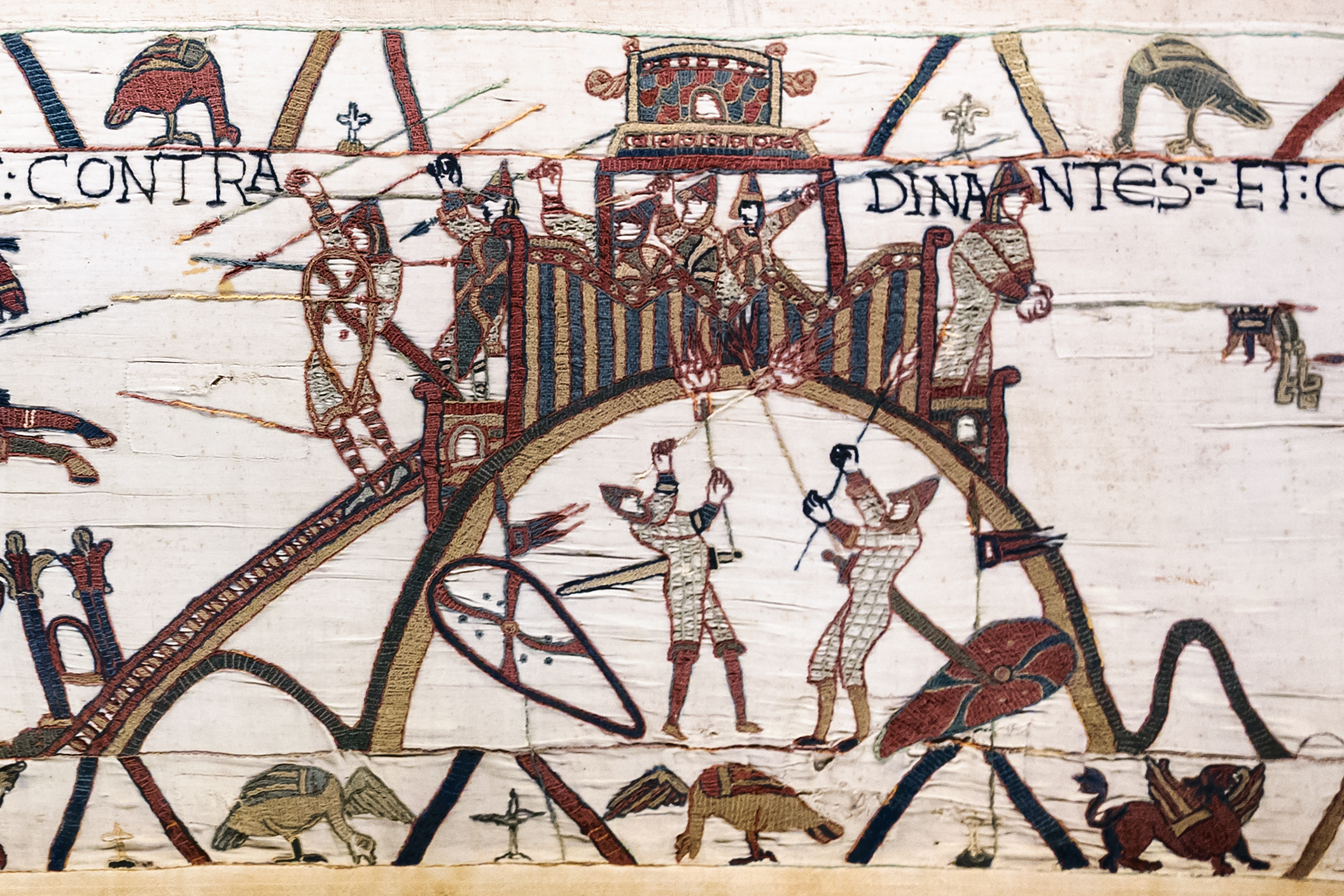
Scene from Bayeux Tapestry (c.1066) showing Breton defenders within the castle of Dinan throwing down spears onto the Norman attackers, whilst some of the latter hold burning torches with which to burn down the wooden fortifications

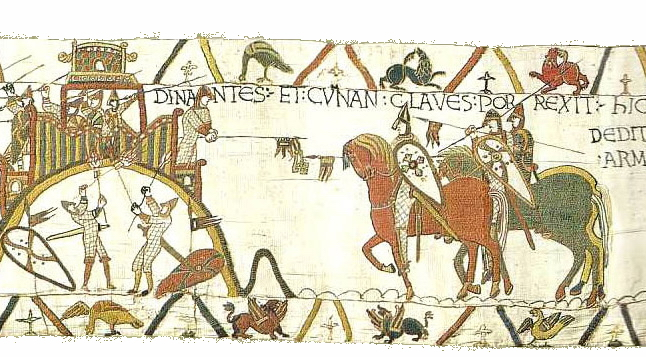
ET CUNAN CLAVES PORREXIT ("and Conan passed out the keys"), scene from Bayeux Tapestry (c.1066) showing Conan II, Duke of Brittany (d.1066) surrendering the keys (hanging from the tip of a lance) to the castle of Dinan, to the forces of William, Duke of Normandy, following the siege and Battle of Dinan

=== Battle of Dinan ===
The Battle of Dinan occurred in 1065. Harold fought on the side of Duke William, whose army had chased Duke Conan from Dol to Rennes. Duke Conan finally surrendered at Château de Dinan, Brittany. The battle is recalled in the Bayeux Tapestry (see illustration).

== Death of the Breton lord ==
During Duke Conan's 1066 campaign against Anjou, he took Pouancé and Segré, and arrived in Château-Gontier. There he was found dead on 11 December after donning poisoned riding gloves. Duke William was widely suspected.

== Aftermath ==
Duke Conan II was succeeded by his sister, Hawise, whose marriage to Hoel of Cornwall may have been a political move to consolidate and stabilize the east and west regions of the duchy.

Bretons would eventually invade England with the Normans in 1066 mainly as cavalry, which they specialized in.

== Bibliography ==
- Howarth, David Armine (2008) [1977]. 1066: The Year of the Conquest. Paw Prints. ISBN 978-1-4395-1242-5.
