= Rebellion of 1088 =

Conflict arising from division of lands in Kingdom of England and Duchy of Normandy

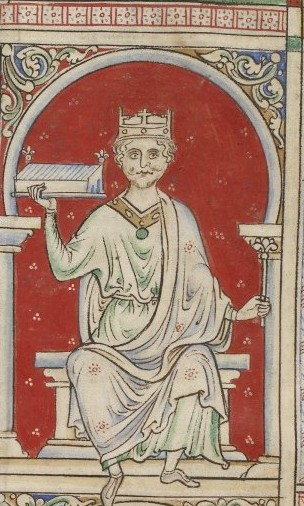
William II drawn by Matthew Paris, from the Stowe Manuscript. British Library, London.

The Rebellion of 1088 occurred after the death of William the Conqueror and concerned the division of lands in the Kingdom of England and the Duchy of Normandy between his two sons William Rufus and Robert Curthose. Hostilities lasted from three to six months starting around Easter of 1088.

== Background ==
William on his deathbed in 1087 decided how his sons would inherit the lands of his native Normandy and recently conquered England. His eldest son Robert was made Duke of Normandy, and his third eldest son (second eldest surviving son) William Rufus was made King of England. This came to pass on William's death.

The division of William the Conqueror's lands into two parts presented a dilemma for those nobles who held land on both sides of the English Channel. Since the younger William and his brother Robert were natural rivals, these nobles worried that they could not hope to please both of their lords and thus ran the risk of losing the favour of one ruler or the other, or both. The solution, as they saw it, was to unite England and Normandy once more under one ruler. The pursuit of this aim led them to revolt against William in favour of Robert, under the leadership of the powerful Bishop Odo of Bayeux, who was a half-brother of William the Conqueror.

The rebels, led by Odo and Robert, Count of Mortain, decided to band together to dispose of young King William II and reunite Normandy and England under a single ruler, Robert Curthose.

Among William's initial supporters were all the bishops of England, a few major magnates including Alan Rufus (in the east of England north of London up to Yorkshire), William de Warenne, 1st Earl of Surrey (from Sussex to Yorkshire) and Hugh of Avranches (in the west, around Cheshire, and in Lincolnshire), and lesser tenants-in-chief such as Robert Fitzhamon and Walter D'Aincourt. The rebel ranks were made up many of the most powerful barons in England: of the ten largest baronial landholders in the Domesday Book, six were counted amongst the rebels. They were spread far and wide geographically from Kent, controlled by Odo, to Northumberland, controlled by Robert de Mowbray, to Gloucestershire and Somerset under Geoffrey de Montbray (Bishop of Coutances), to Norfolk with Roger Bigod, through Shropshire and Sussex and other counties with Roger of Montgomery, and a vast swathe of territory in the south-west, centre and south of England under Count Robert. In support of the rebels were Eustace III, Count of Boulogne and "Hugh de Grantmesnil, who had the government of Leicestershire, with Robert de Rhuddlan his nephew, and other knights of distinguished bravery".

== Rebellion ==
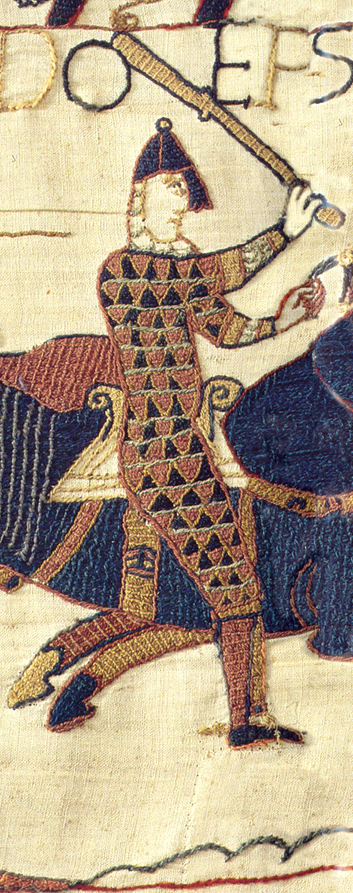
Odo of Bayeux depicted in the Bayeux Tapestry, and named at top

With the coming of summer in 1088, the barons set out on a campaign to lay waste the lands of William II and his supporters. They fortified their own castles and stocked them with provisions, and waited for a response from the king. If for some reason no response came, they knew they could easily live by plundering neighbouring territories, and thus reduce the kingdom to feudal anarchy, a situation the king would eventually have to address.

The king's response was threefold. First, he divided his enemies by promising those who sided with him that they would receive as much money and land as they wanted. Second, he appealed to the English people as a whole, promising them "the best law that had ever been in this land". This had a positive effect in allowing regional garrisons the support they needed to fight the rebels. Finally, he attacked the rebels personally. In a six-week siege of Pevensey Castle in Sussex he captured Odo.

The troops Robert was sending from Normandy were driven back by bad weather on the seas. Meanwhile, William along with some of his allies took Rochester Castle in Kent, and with Robert's failure to arrive, the rebels were forced to surrender and the rebellion was over. Those of William's barons who had remained loyal urged leniency for the rebel barons, Orderic Vitalis says, addressing the king:

If you temper your animosity against these great men, and treat them graciously here, or permit them to depart in safety, you may advantageously use their amity and service, on many future occasions. He who is your enemy now, may be your useful friend another time.

According to the Anglo-Saxon Chronicle, many of the rebels fled to Normandy. Odo, previously the richest man in England, was stripped of his belongings and banished to Normandy for life, while Robert Curthose was allowed to stay in England and keep his estates in Normandy, on the proviso that he recognise William as king and set aside his claim to the throne. Roger of Montgomery had left the rebels and joined with William after promises of land and money. The king pragmatically kept those aristocrats whom he needed and removed those who were a threat. William de St-Calais, Bishop of Durham, who had abandoned the king's army during the campaign, was tried later in the year, deposed, and exiled to Normandy, but in 1091 he returned and was reinstated. Many of the properties abandoned by the rebels were seized by the king and redistributed to his allies.

== Sources ==
- Carpenter, David (2004). The Struggle for Mastery: The Penguin History of Britain 1066–1284. New York: Penguin. ISBN 0-14-014824-8.
