= Dol-de-Bretagne =

Dol-de-Bretagne Dóu (Gallo) Dol (Breton)
- Commune
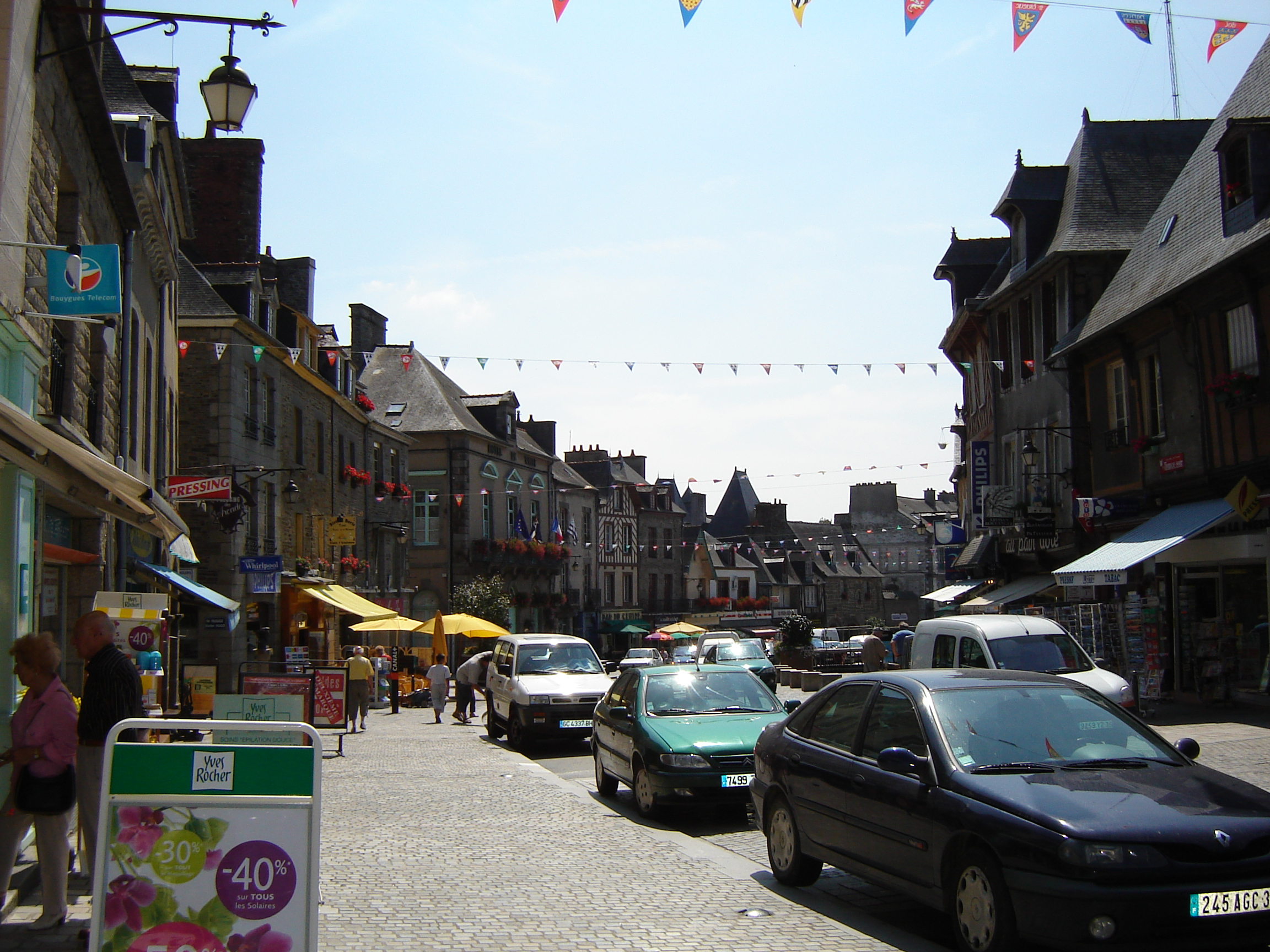
- La Grande Rue

- Flag Coat of arms
- Location of Dol-de-Bretagne
- Location within France Location within Brittany
- Coordinates: 48°33′02″N 1°44′59″W
- Country: France
- Region: Brittany
- Department: Ille-et-Vilaine
- Arrondissement: Saint-Malo
- Canton: Dol-de-Bretagne

Government
  - Mayor (2020–2026): Denis Rapinel
- Area^{1}: 15.53 km^{2} (6.00 sq mi)
- Elevation: 17 m (56 ft)
- Highest elevation: 58 m (190 ft)
- Lowest elevation: 1 m (3.3 ft)
- Population (2023): 5,829
  - Density: 375.3/km^{2} (972.1/sq mi)
- Time zone: UTC+01:00 (CET)
  - Summer (DST): UTC+02:00 (CEST)
- INSEE/Postal code: 35095 /35120
- ^{1} French Land Register data, which excludes lakes, ponds, glaciers > 1 km^{2} (0.386 sq mi or 247 acres) and river estuaries.

Dol-de-Bretagne (French pronunciation: [dɔl də bʁətaɲ], literally Dol of Brittany; Breton: Dol; Gallo: Dóu), cited in most historical records under its Breton name of Dol, is a commune in the Ille-et-Vilaine département in Brittany in northwestern France.

The commune is listed as a Village étape.

== Geography ==
Dol-de-Bretagne is situated in the northern part of the Ille-et-Vilaine department, 6 km from the English Channel coast and 22 km southeast of Saint-Malo. Dol-de-Bretagne station is served by high speed trains to Rennes and Paris, and regional trains to Saint-Malo, Saint-Brieuc, Granville and Rennes.

== History ==
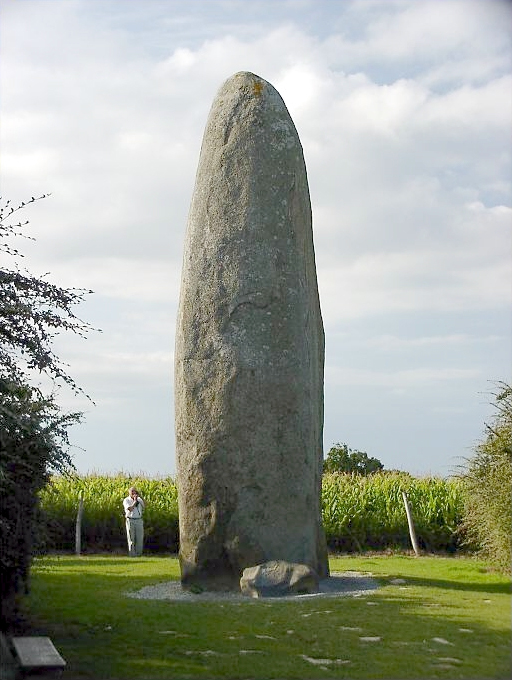
The Menhir de Champ-Dolent has an estimated weight of 125 to 150 tons

Dol is a Breton term meaning "low and fertile place in the flood plain of a waterway;" cf. Welsh dôl ("meadow").

In 549, the Welsh Saint Teilo was documented as coming to Dol where he joined Samson of Dol, and the fruit groves which they planted remain and are known as the groves of Teilo and Samson. Legend has it that while there he was assigned by King Budic II to subdue a belligerent winged dragon, which he was said to have tamed and then tied to a rock in the sea off Brittany. He is reported to have stayed in Dol for seven years and seven months so must have left in 556 or 557.

Dol-de-Bretagne is reputed to be the origin of the royal House of Stewart who became the monarchs of Scotland and later England and Ireland; a plaque in Dol commemorates that origin. The Stewart monarchs descend from Alan the Seneschal of the Bishop of Dol. His son, Flaad Fitzalan and his son Alan, arrived in Britain at the request of Henry I, King of England. Flaad's grandson, Walter Fitzalan, was appointed the 1st Steward of Scotland by David I of Scotland. Malcolm IV of Scotland later confirmed the honour bestowed by David and made the office of Steward of Scotland hereditary in Walter's family. In the fourteenth century, Walter Stewart (so named for his family's hereditary possession of the office of High Steward of Scotland), a descendant of Walter Fitzalan, married Marjorie Bruce, daughter of King Robert I of Scotland. Their son became King Robert II, and their descendants the royal House of Stewart.

Dol figured prominently in the formation and evolution of the Duchy of Brittany. Nominoe, the ruler of Brittany attempted to establish a metropolitan archbishop for the Breton church in a move to give it autonomy, and thereby strengthen his rule and further secure his independence from the Carolingian Empire. It took centuries for Rome to recognize the Archbishop of Dol. However, after the formation of the Duchy of Brittany in 939, the Archbishop of Dol often wielded great political power and was even at one time Regent to a young Duke of Brittany. Dol Cathedral is a significant building in an eclectic mix of styles.

In 1064, William, Duke of Normandy led an expedition against Brittany, in which Harold Godwinson, his later opponent at the Battle of Hastings, played an active part. Scene 18 of the Bayeux Tapestry depicts the capture of the castle at Dol, which was captured before Rennes and Dinan. In 1076 the town was again besieged by William, who by now was King of England, this time unsuccessfully after the king of France broke the siege.

The town was taken by Henry II of England in 1164. In June 1173 Hugh de Kevelioc, 5th Earl of Chester, laid siege to Dol-de-Bretagne and captured the settlement as part of the Revolt of 1173–1174 against Henry. Henry, supported by an army of 20,000 mercenaries retook Dol-de-Bretagne the same year. The town was again taken by Guy of Thouars in 1204.

The diocese of Dol was suppressed in 1801.

Located near the town is Cricket Club Des Ormes, which in 2003 set a world record for the longest cricket match. The club played for 26 hours and 13 minutes. The record has been beaten a number of times since.

== Population ==
Inhabitants of Dol-de-Bretagne are called Dolois in French.

Historical population
Year	Pop.	±% p.a.
1968	4,497	—
1975	4,624	+0.40%
1982	4,660	+0.11%
1990	4,629	−0.08%
1999	4,563	−0.16%
2007	4,807	+0.65%
2012	5,412	+2.40%
2017	5,693	+1.02%
2023	5,829	+0.39%
Source: INSEE

== Cultural legacy ==
Dol is home to a number of significant heritage sites, including a 12th-century house.

== In literature ==
Dol is one of the settings for a lai by Marie de France; Gurun, lord of Dol, is one of the main characters in "Le Fresne".

== Gallery ==
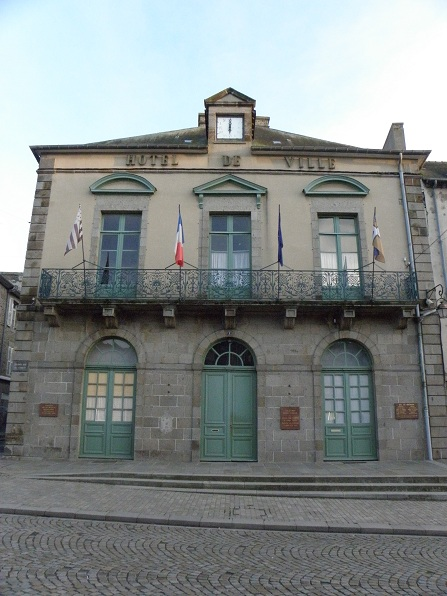
Town hall

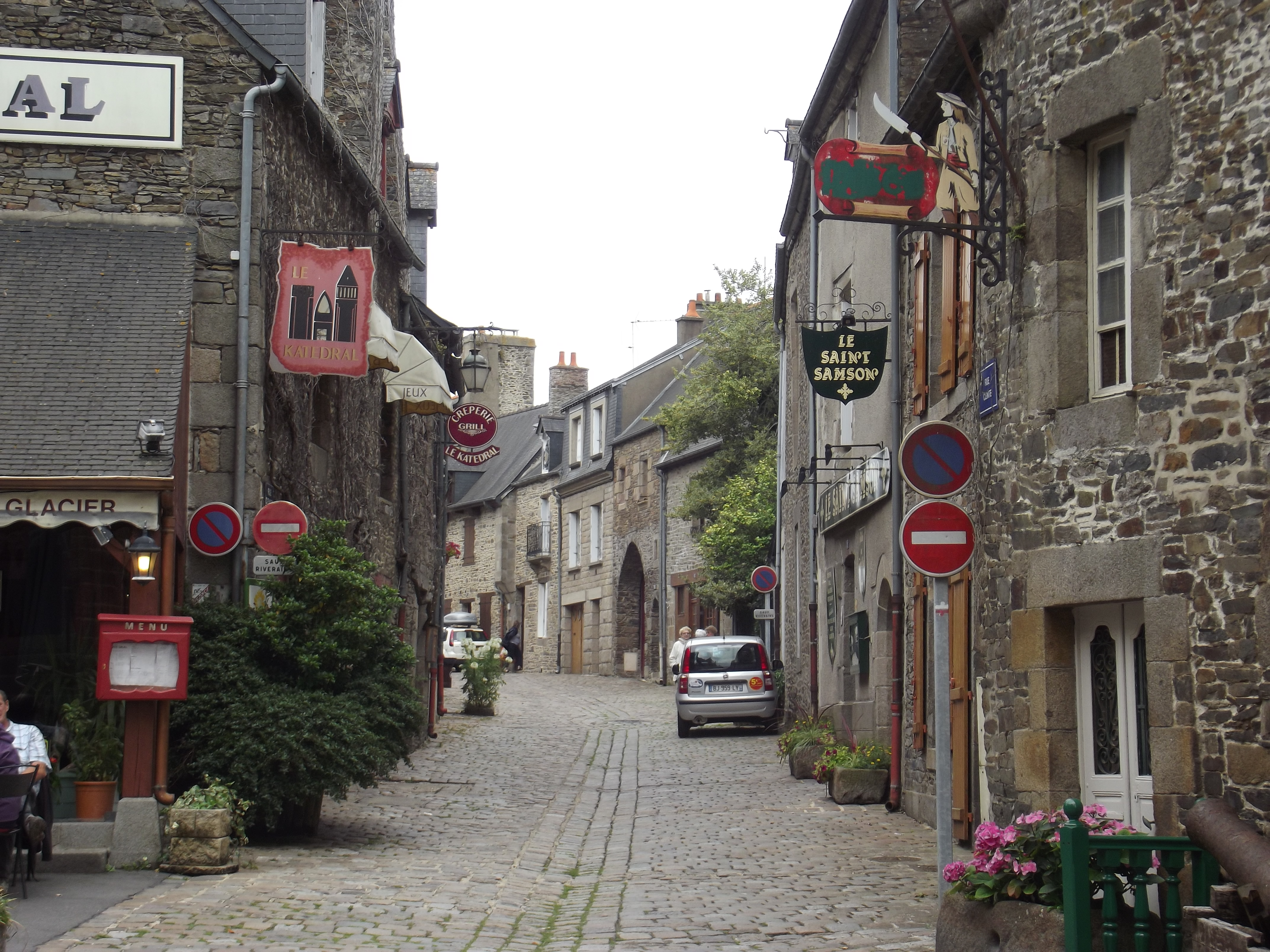
Rue Ceinte

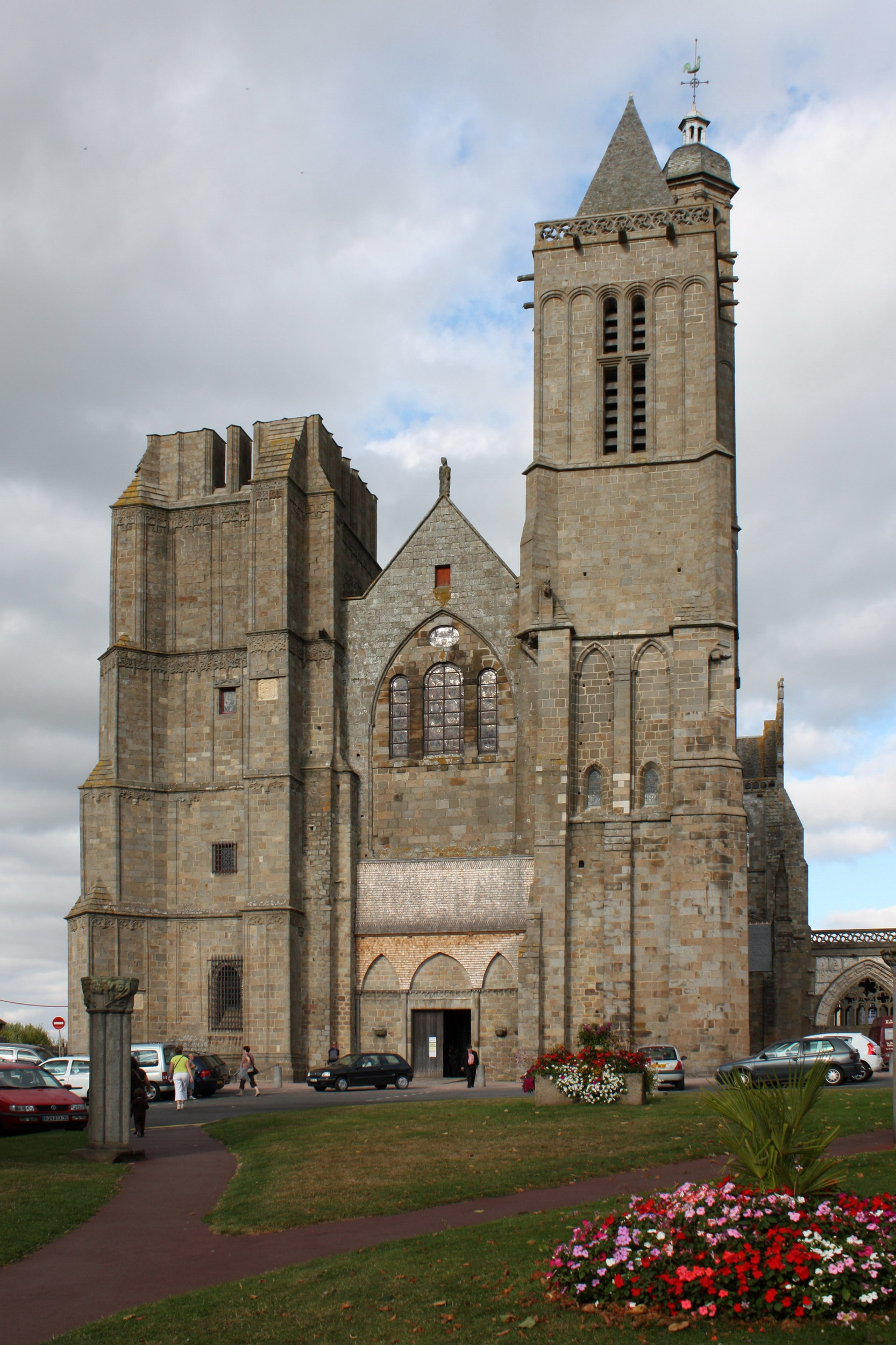
Saint Samson cathedral

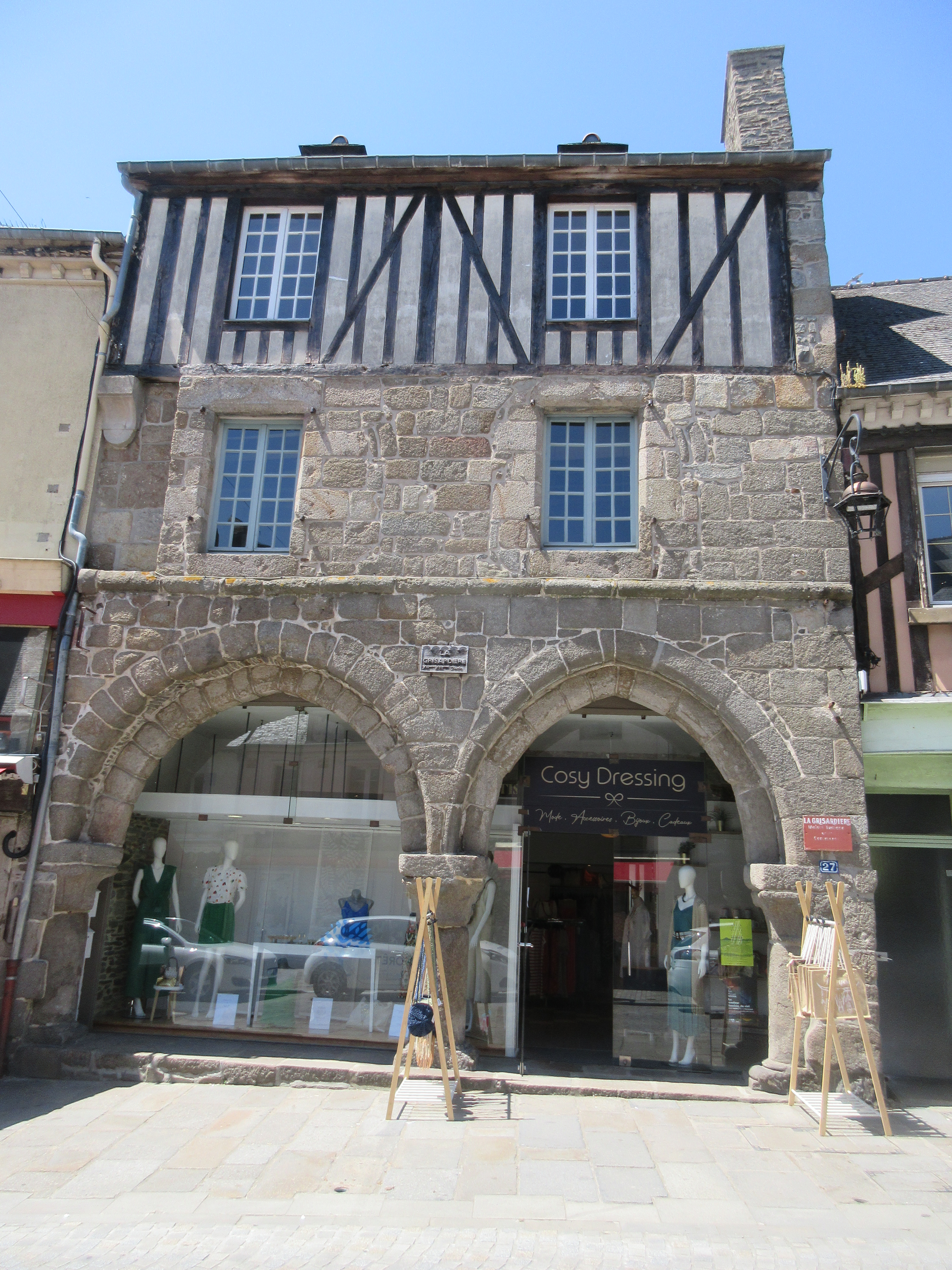
Maison de la Grisardière

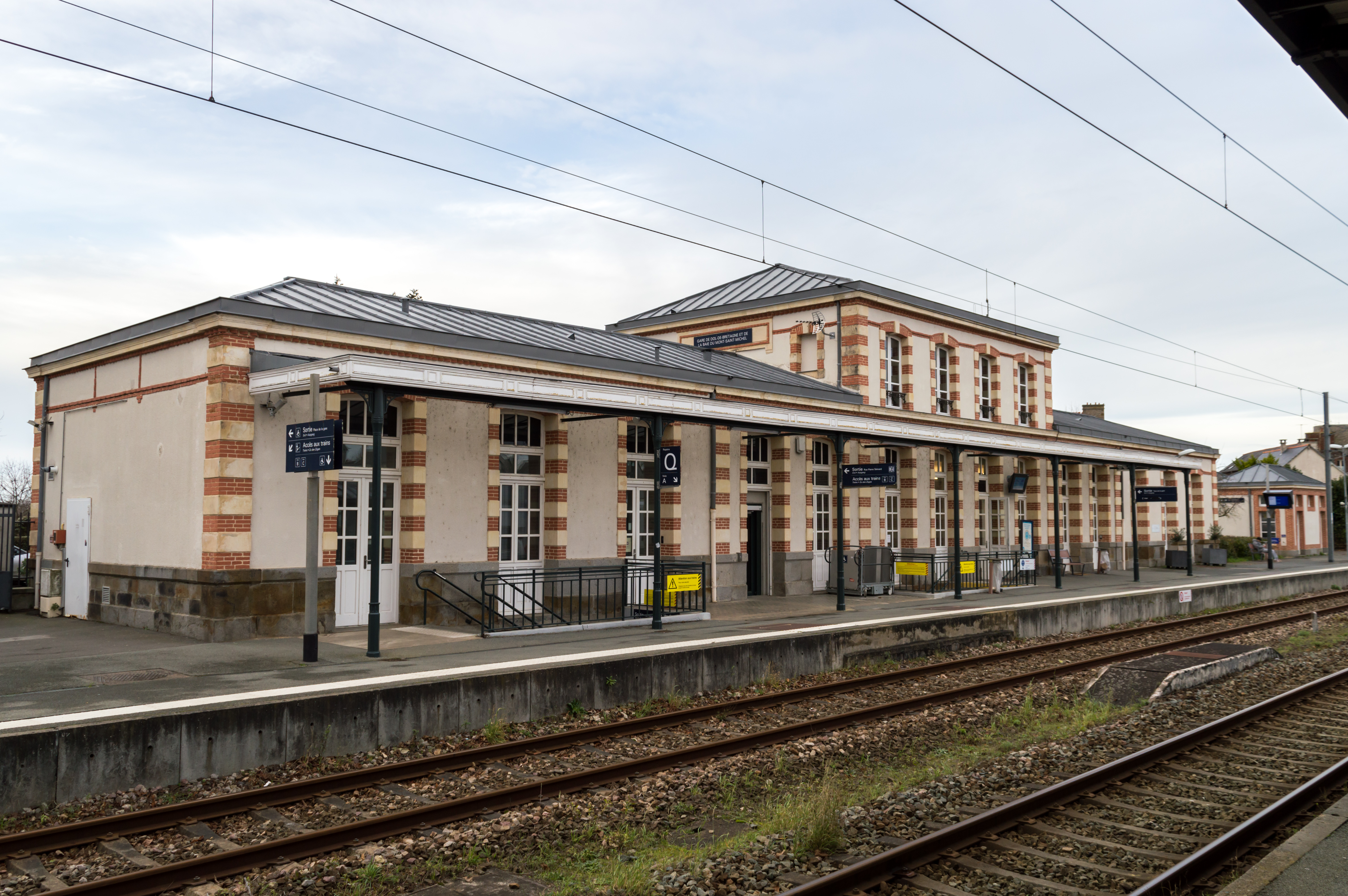
Train station

== See also ==
- Communes of the Ille-et-Vilaine department
- List of megalithic sites
- André César Vermare Sculptor of war memorial in cathedral.

== Bibliography ==
- Flori, Jean (1999). Richard the Lionheart: Knight and King. Jean Birrell. Edinburgh: Edinburgh University Press. ISBN 978-0-7486-2047-0.
