= Conan II of Brittany =

Conan II

Duke of Brittany
- Reign: 1 October 1040 – 11 December 1066
- Predecessor: Alan III
- Successor: Hawise and Hoël II
- Regent: Odo I (1040–1057)
- Born: c. 1033
- Died: 11 December 1066; Château-Gontier
- House: Rennes
- Father: Alan III, Duke of Brittany
- Mother: Bertha of Blois

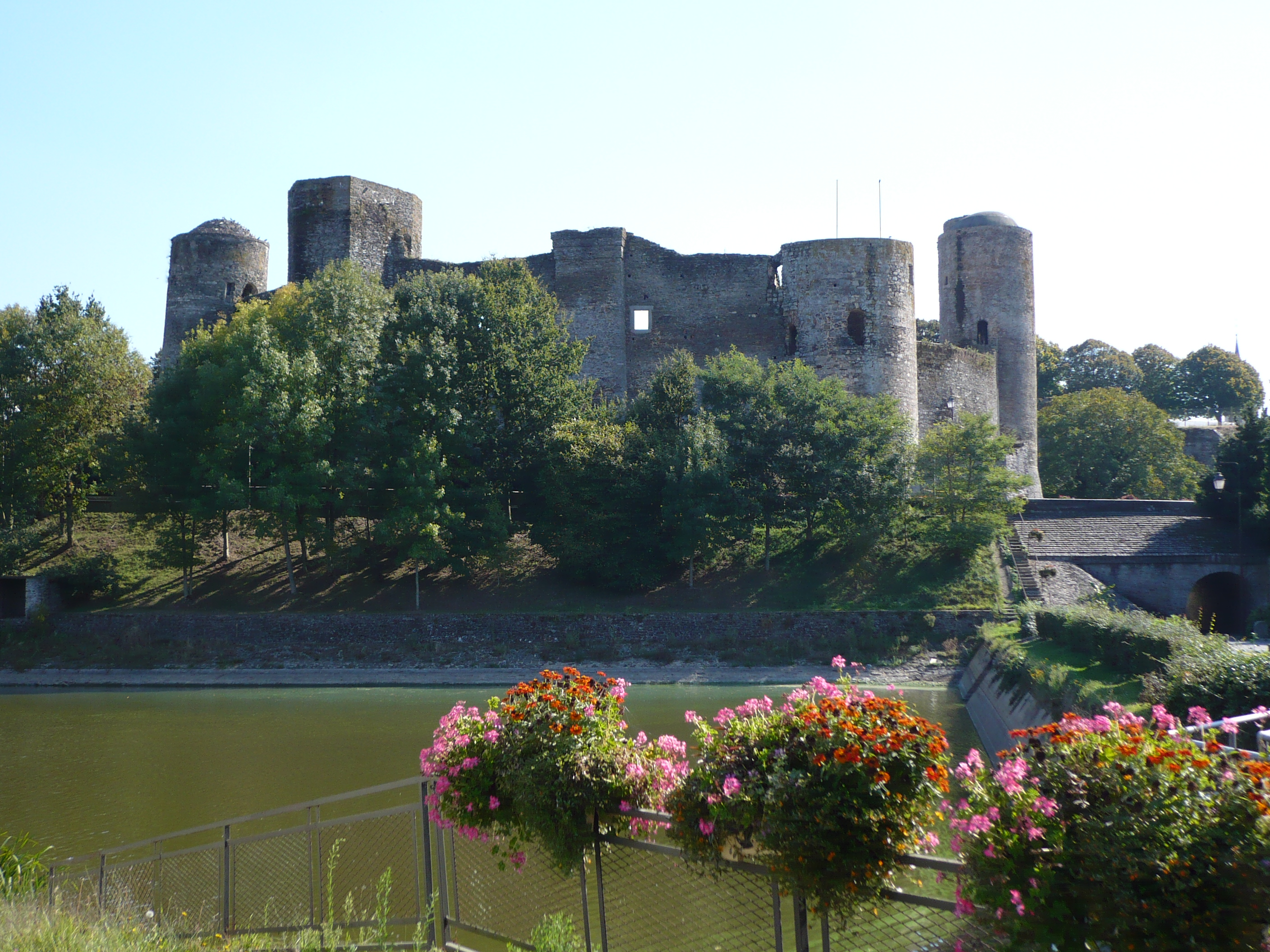
The Chateau de Pouancé was captured by Conan II

Conan II of Rennes (c. 1033 – 11 December 1066) was Duke of Brittany, from 1040 to his death. Conan was the eldest child and heir of Alan III, Duke of Brittany by his wife Bertha of Blois, and member of the House of Rennes. He was the elder brother of Hawise, who succeeded him as suo jure duchess.

== Duke of Brittany ==
Conan II faced a daunting series of challenges to assert his rule as Duke of Brittany. His father Duke Alan III had died when Conan was still a minor, his grandfather Duke Geoffrey I's attempts at an alliance with Normandy had been reduced to border skirmishes, his uncle Odo challenged his right to rule and he faced a rebellion from Breton nobles, notably Rivallon I of Dol. Conan's inheritance was usurped by his uncle, Odo, who initially ruled Brittany as regent during Conan's minority. However, by the time Conan reached his majority his uncle Odo refused to give up his authority. By 1057 Conan captured his uncle, whom he then had chained and imprisoned.

=== Norman interference ===
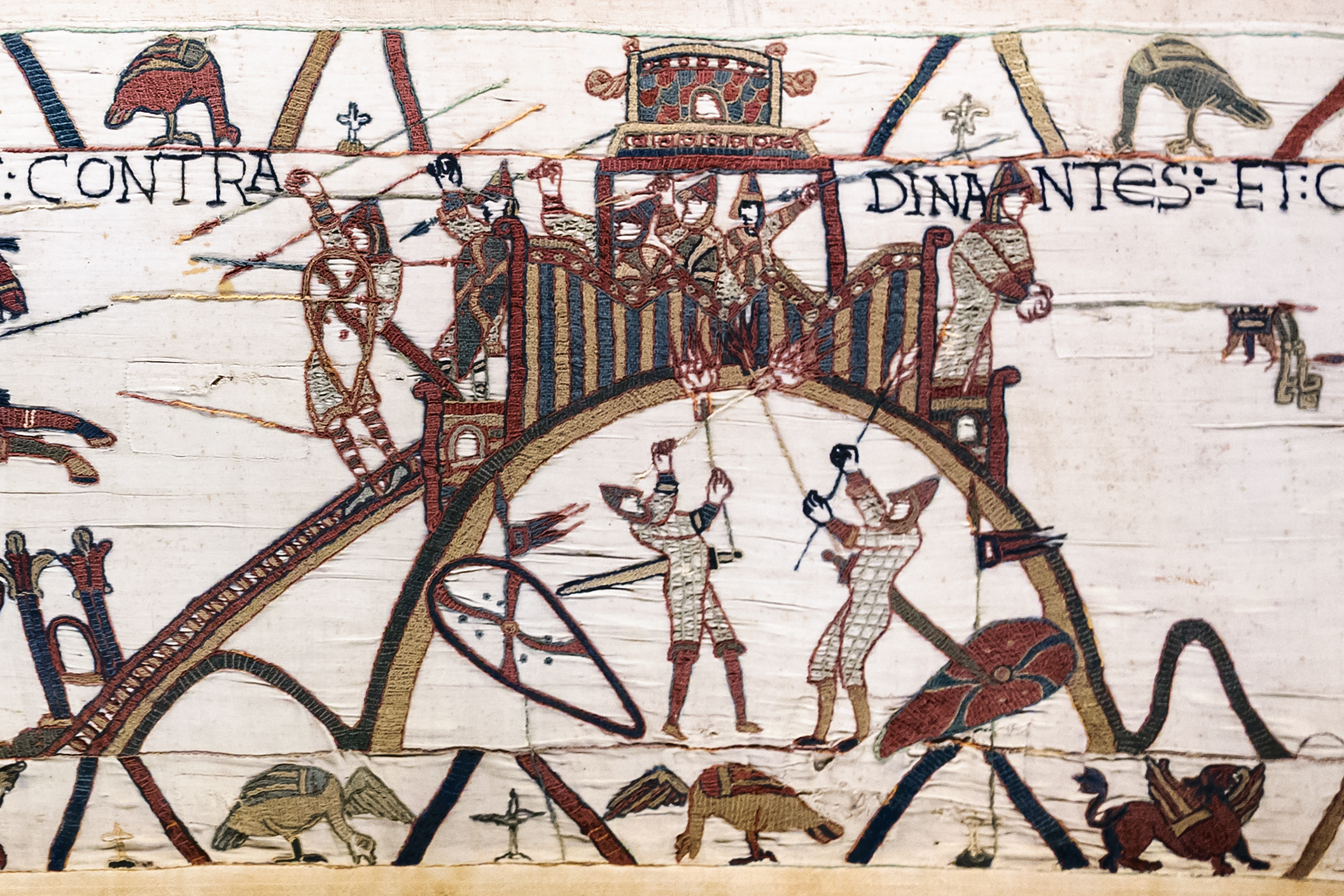
The Bayeux Tapestry's Battle of Dinan - Duke Conan II surrenders the Keys to Dinan on a lance

Once enthroned as Duke Conan II of Brittany, he faced numerous threats, including revolts from his nobles sponsored by William, Duke of Normandy, afterwards King of England.

Brittany, an independent Celtic duchy, had a traditional rivalry with neighboring Normandy. The 1064–1065 war between Brittany and Normandy was sparked after Duke William supported Rivallon I of Dol's rebellion against Conan II.

In 1065, before his invasion of Anglo-Saxon England, William of Normandy sent word to the surrounding counties, including Brittany, warning them against attacking his lands, on the grounds that his mission bore the papal banner. Conan promptly informed the duke that he would definitely take the opportunity to invade the latter's duchy. In the history of conflicts between Brittany and Anjou, Pouancé had served as the "Breton March" or border town. During Conan's 1066 campaign against Anjou, he took Pouancé and Segré, and arrived in Château-Gontier, where he was found dead after donning poisoned riding gloves. Duke William was widely suspected. He was also asked to help William the Conqueror on his 1066 conquest of England, but refused, saying that the Normans poisoned his father in 1040.

Conan II died leaving no known issue. It is possible he died because the gloves he was wearing were poisoned, and he swallowed the poison when he wiped his mouth with the glove.

=== Succession ===
He was succeeded by his sister Hawise and brother-in-law, Hoël II, whose marriage may have been a political move to consolidate and stabilize the east and west regions of the duchy following Conan's death.

== Bibliography ==
- Howarth, David Armine (2008) [1977]. 1066: The Year of the Conquest. Paw Prints. ISBN 978-1-4395-1242-5.

Conan II of Brittany House of Rennes Born: 1033 Died: 11 December 1066
Regnal titles
Preceded by Alan III	Duke of Brittany; 1040–1066 with Odo I (1040–1057)	Succeeded by Hawise; Hoël II
