= FitzEmpress =

FitzEmpress is a surname given to the offspring of Geoffrey Plantagenet and Empress Matilda, namely:

- Henry FitzEmpress (1133–1189), King Henry II of England
- Geoffrey FitzEmpress (1134–1158), Count of Nantes
- William FitzEmpress (1136–1164), Viscount of Dieppe

== See also ==
- Fitz
