= Emma, abbess of Shaftesbury =

English medieval abbess

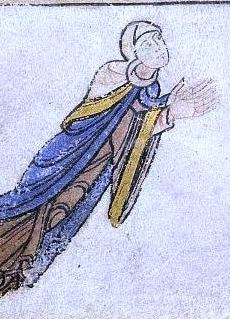
A noblewoman kneeling in front of Christ, previously identified as Emma but now thought to depict Adeliza of Louvain

Emma (fl. 1120s) was English nun and abbess. She was abbess of the Benedictine nunnery at Shaftesbury Abbey in Dorset, during beginning of the 12th century. She is mentioned by name in an 1121–1122 charter from King Henry I of England's reign.

== Biography ==
It is not certain, but it is possible that Emma succeeded as abbess at Shaftesbury Abbey after the death of Eulalia in 1106.

The abbey owned a large quantity of land, which was leased to tenants in order to provide income to the abbey. The charter from the king related to a number of lawsuits that Emma conducted in 1127 against various tenants of the abbey's lands who had appropriated the land for themselves; the charter given by the king affirmed the abbey's ownership of the lands in question. In the reign of King Stephen, he confirmed by charter the lands which Emma had earlier proved to belong to the abbey in the presence of Henry I and his barons.

The "Shaftesbury Psalter" which has been dated to 1130-1140 was originally attributed to Emma, with other theories claiming that it belonged to Henry I's second wife and queen consort Adeliza of Louvain. Either of these women would have been in a position to be able to commission such an expensive book, as antiquary Dugdale described Shaftesbury as "one of the best endowed nunneries in England." The psalter is made of vellum, features female forms of Latin and depicts a woman wearing golden slippers and praying in full-page illuminations. It is currently held in the collection of the British Library and copies of the illuminations are on display.

Emma was succeeded by Mary of Shaftesbury as abbess, who was the illegitimate daughter of Count Geoffrey V of Anjou and half-sister of King Henry II of England.
