= Elizabeth Zouche =

16th-century English abbess

Elizabeth Zouche (before 1496 – after 1553), was an English abbess. She was the last abbess of Shaftesbury Abbey, a Benedictine nunnery founded by Alfred the Great which was one of the largest and richest in England. She signed the deed of surrender on 23 March 1539 which brought the 650 year life of the abbey to an abrupt end and granted all its property and wealth to Henry VIII.

== Life ==
Elizabeth Zouche came from a noble family with lands in the vicinity of Shaftesbury and was known to have been a novice at the abbey in 1496.

=== Abbess ===
She was elected as the abbess in 1529, succeeding Elizabeth Shelford who died in 1528.

By the time she became abbess, the train of events leading to the Dissolution of the Monasteries and the demise of the abbey was already underway. Having assented to the Act of Supremacy in 1534, Elizabeth Zouche and the nuns at Shaftesbury were visited by two commissions of enquiry in the following year, looking at the wealth and morality of the abbey. Shaftesbury was at this time the second richest nunnery in England. When the dissolution process began in 1536, as one of the larger abbeys, Shaftesbury was not immediately affected, but there was some impact as the abbess took in the prioress and two nuns displaced from a small Benedictine house in Somerset.

=== Dissolution ===
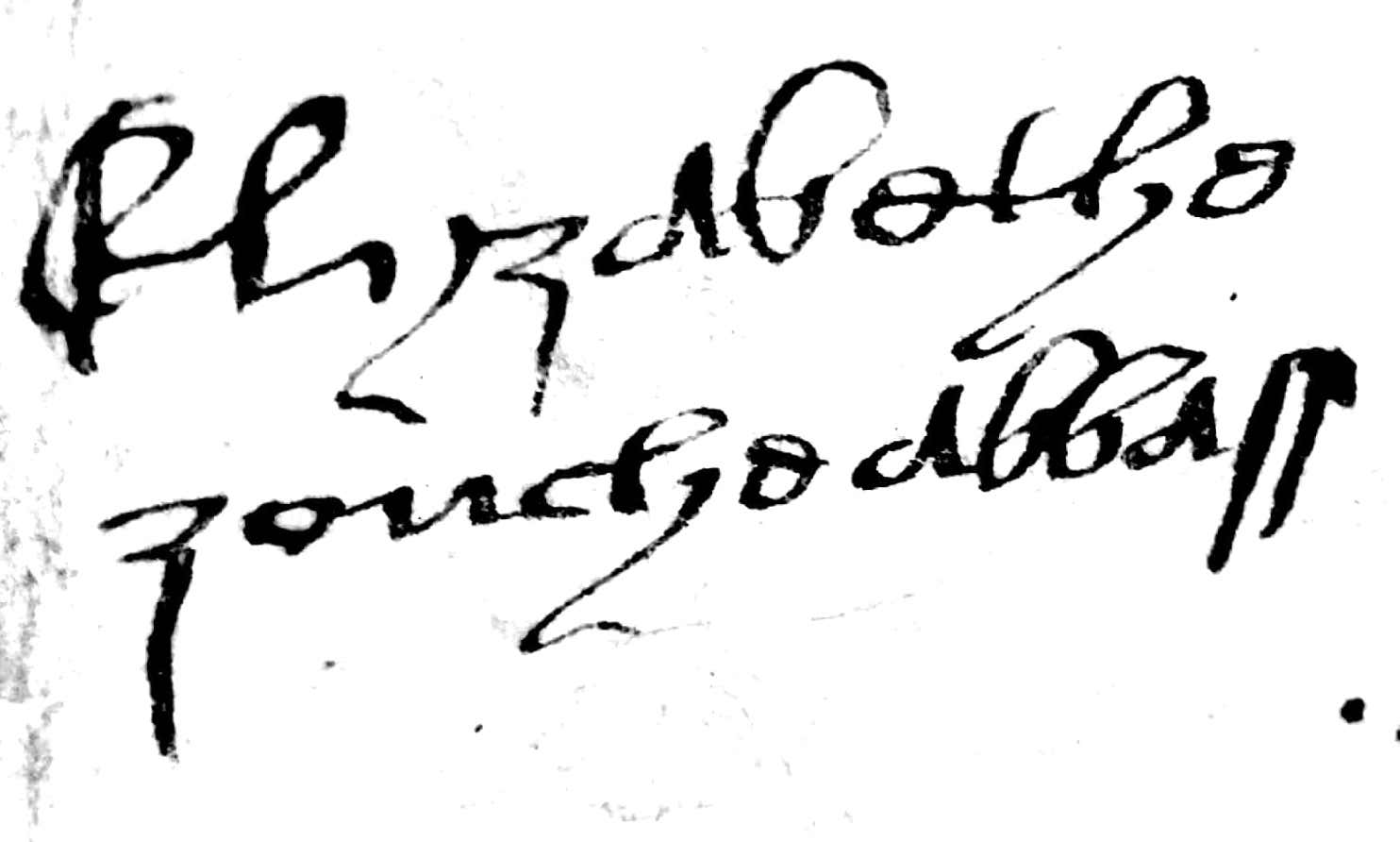
Signature of Elizabeth Zouche on the deed of surrender of 1539

When the noose started to close on the larger houses like Shaftesbury in 1538, Elizabeth Zouche at first tried to negotiate, offering the sum of 500 marks to the king and £100 to Thomas Cromwell to allow herself and her nuns to remain in their abbey, "by some other name and apparel". The deal was not accepted and the inevitable demise of the abbey came in March 1539, the last to surrender in Dorset. Elizabeth Zouche surrendered the abbey to John Tregonwell on Passion Sunday, 23 March, signing an ignominious deed of surrender, but not before she had negotiated generous pensions for herself and her fellow nuns on the previous day. The total of all the pensions was £431, of which Elizabeth Zouche's was by far the largest individual pension at £133 6s. 8d. Compared with average labour earnings of the period, the equivalent sum now would be £871,000 a year.

=== Later life ===
Records show that Elizabeth Zouche kept in touch with her former nuns, giving fifty of them a present of the value of a goose in 1553. It was also authorised in 1552 that the full value of her pension could pass on her death as an annuity to Sir John Zouche of Ansty, who is presumed to have been a relative and subsequently served as the MP for Shaftesbury. She was evidently still alive in 1553, but it is not known how much longer she lived.

== Fictional portrayal ==
Elizabeth Zouche appears as a character in The Butcher's Daughter, a novel by Victoria Glendinning based on the dissolution of the abbey, which was published in 2018. Elizabeth Zouche appears also in The Mirror & the Light, the final part of Hilary Mantel's trilogy covering the life of Thomas Cromwell, published in 2020. In the 2024 BBC Wolf Hall dramatisation of The Mirror & the Light she is portrayed by Amanda Root.
