= Leofgifu =

Leofgifu was abbess of Shaftesbury Abbey in Dorset, England during the mid 11th century.

She was the last Anglo-Saxon abbess to hold authority over Shaftesbury prior to the changes that occurred in England after the Norman conquest in 1066. Her successor Eulalia was likely of French descent.

Her name is mentioned in the past tense in the 'Exon Domesday', a manuscript related to the Domesday survey.
