= Château de Chinon =

Castle in France

Coordinates: 47°10′05″N 0°14′10″E

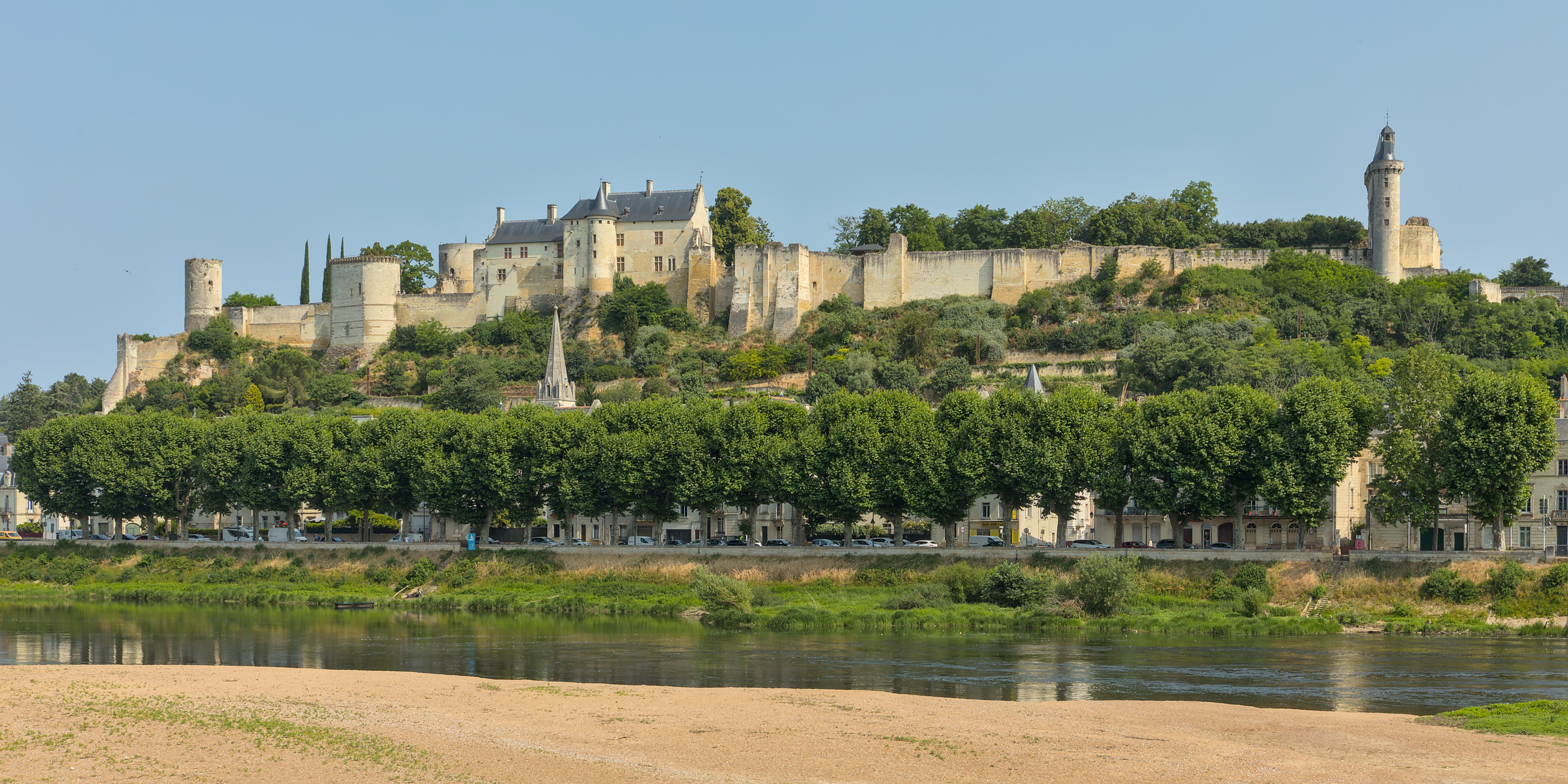
Château de Chinon from the south

The Château de Chinon is a château located on the north bank of the river Vienne in Chinon, central France. It was founded by Theobald I, Count of Blois. In the 11th century the castle became the property of the counts of Anjou. In 1156 Henry II of England, a member of the House of Anjou, took the castle from his brother Geoffrey, Count of Nantes, after Geoffrey rebelled for a second time. Henry favoured the Château de Chinon as a residence. Most of the standing structure can be attributed to his reign; he died there in 1189.

Early in the 13th century, King Philip II of France harassed the English lands in France, and in 1205 he captured Chinon after a siege that lasted several months. Thereafter, the castle remained under French control. When King Philip IV accused the Knights Templar of heresy during the first decade of the 14th century, several leading members of the order were imprisoned there.

Used as a residence by Charles VII in the 15th century, the Château de Chinon became a prison in the second half of the 16th century, but then fell out of use and was left to decay. It was recognized as a monument historique by the French Ministry of Culture in 1840. The castle, which contains a museum, is now owned and managed by the Indre-et-Loire General Council and is a major tourist attraction. It was restored in the early 21st century, at a cost of €14.5 million.

== History ==
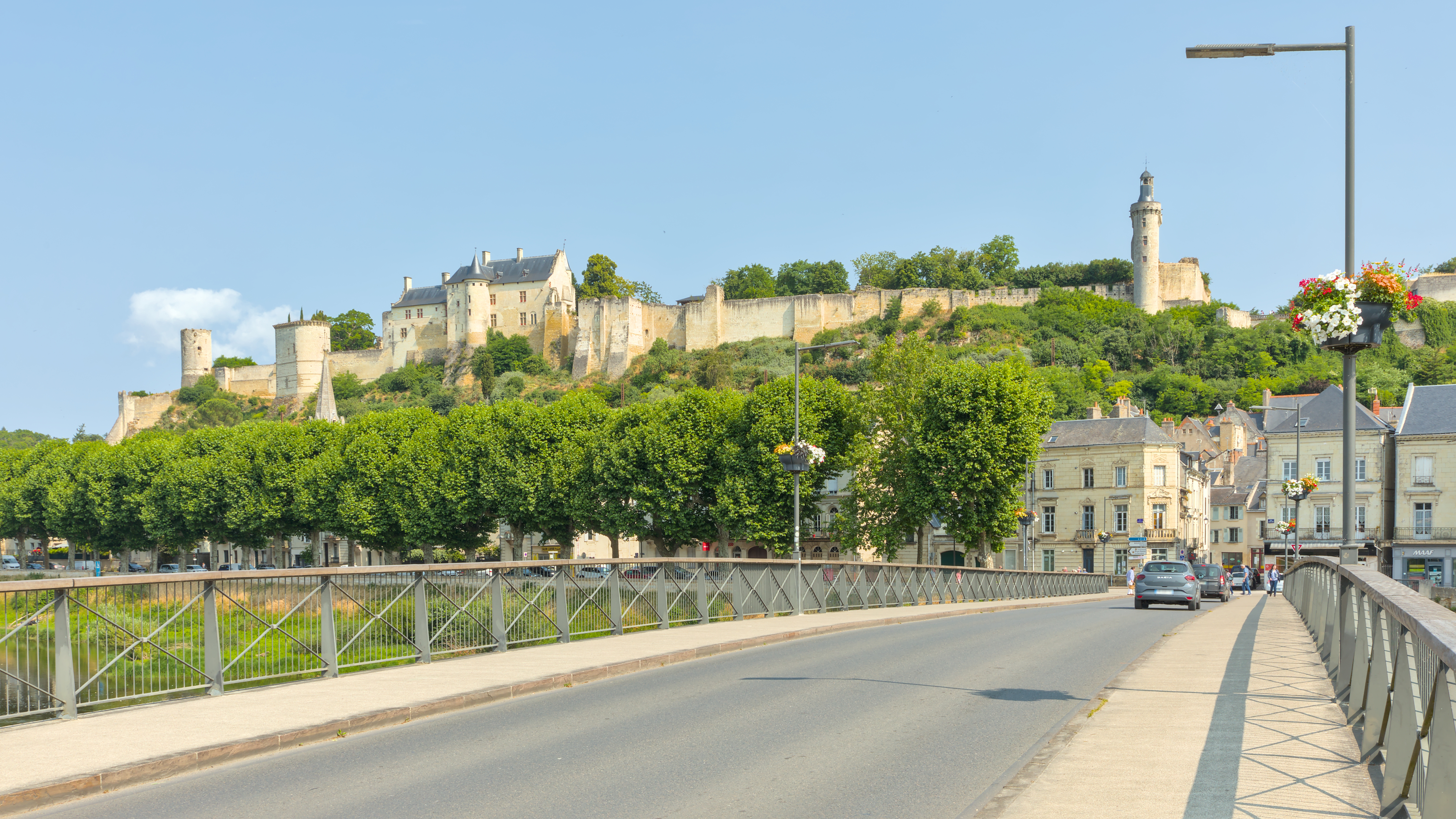
The castle viewed from the Eleanor of Aquitaine bridge over the Vienne

=== Background ===
The settlement of Chinon is on the bank of the river Vienne about 10 kilometres (6 mi) from where it joins the Loire. From prehistoric times, when the settlement of Chinon originated, rivers formed the major trade routes, and the Vienne joins the fertile southern plains of the Poitou and the city of Limoges to the thoroughfare of the Loire. The site was fortified early on, and by the 5th century a Gallo-Roman castrum had been established. Theobald I, Count of Blois built the earliest known castle on the mount of Chinon in the 10th century. He fortified it for use as a stronghold. After Odo II, Count of Blois died in battle in 1037, Fulk III, Count of Anjou marched into Touraine to capture the Château de Langeais and then Chinon, some 22 km (14 mi) away. When Fulk arrived at Chinon the castle's garrison immediately sought terms and surrendered. In 1044, Geoffrey II, Count of Anjou captured Theobald of Blois-Chartres. In exchange for his release, Theobald agreed to recognise Geoffrey's ownership of Chinon, Langeais, and Tours. From then until the early 13th century, Château de Chinon descended through his heirs.

=== Counts of Anjou ===
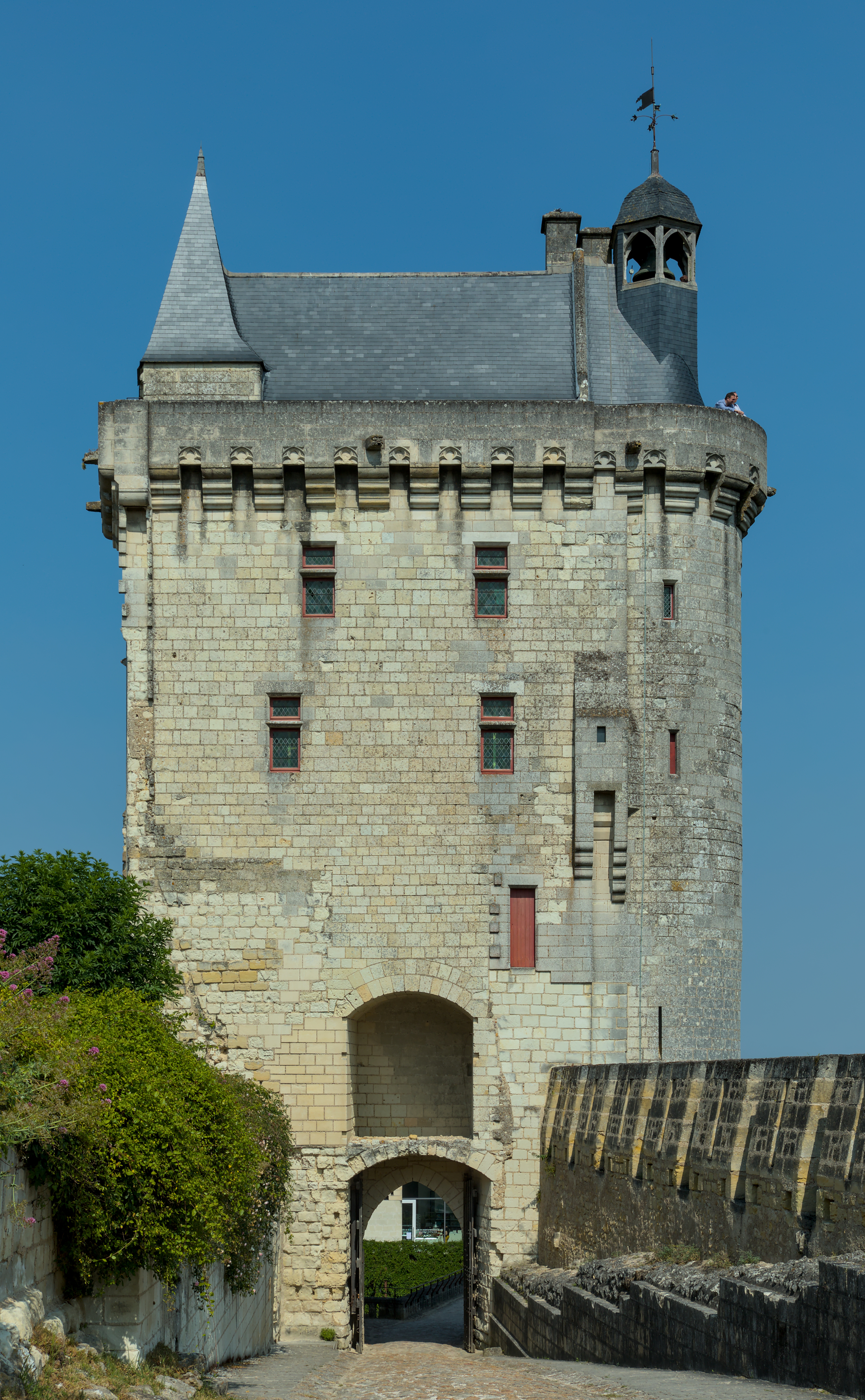
La Tour de l'Horloge (the clock tower)

According to contemporaneous chronicler Robert of Torigni, on the death of Geoffrey Plantagenet, Count of Anjou in 1151 his second son, who was also called Geoffrey, inherited four castles. Robert did not specify which these were, but the English historian W. L. Warren speculated that Chinon, Montsoreau, Loudun, and Mirebeau numbered amongst these castles as they were in the territory which may have been traditionally the inheritance of the second oldest son. Geoffrey rebelled against his older brother, Henry, in 1152. Henry negotiated with the castellans of the castles of Chinon, Loudun, and Mirebeau to surrender before laying siege to the Château de Montsoreau. Following the loss of Montsoreau, Geoffrey surrendered to his brother. By 1156 Chinon, Loudun, and Mirebeau were back under Geoffrey's control. That year he readied them for war as he rebelled against Henry a second time. In the intervening years, his brother had been crowned King Henry II of England at the end of a long-running civil war. Henry besieged and captured Geoffrey's castles in the summer of 1156 and kept them under his control, giving Geoffrey an annuity of £1,500 in compensation. The presence of a treasury and one of Henry II's main arsenals marked Chinon as a particularly important castle in the 12th century. It was a primary residence of Henry II, who was responsible for construction of almost all of the massive castle.

In 1173 Henry II betrothed his youngest son, Prince John, to the daughter of Umberto III, Count of Savoy, an influential lord in Provence. John had no land, but as part of the arrangement Henry promised him the castles of Chinon, Loudun, and Mirebeau. Henry II's eldest son, also called Henry, had been crowned king of England alongside his father but had no land of his own and was angered by the slight. His discontent grew and Henry the Young King demanded some of the land promised to him be handed over, claiming to have the support of the English barons and his father-in-law, King Louis VII of France. While the King was at Limoges he was informed of a conspiracy involving his wife and sons to overthrow him. Choosing to keep his eldest son by his side, Henry II set off north to Normandy, ensuring along the way that his castles in Aquitaine were prepared for war. En route they stayed at Chinon; under the cover of darkness Henry the Young King escaped and set off to Paris to join the court of Louis VII. Two of Henry the Young King's brothers, Richard and Geoffrey, joined him in rebellion along with the barons of France and some in England. War followed, lasting until 1174, and Chinon, Loudun, and Châtellerault were key to Henry II's defence.

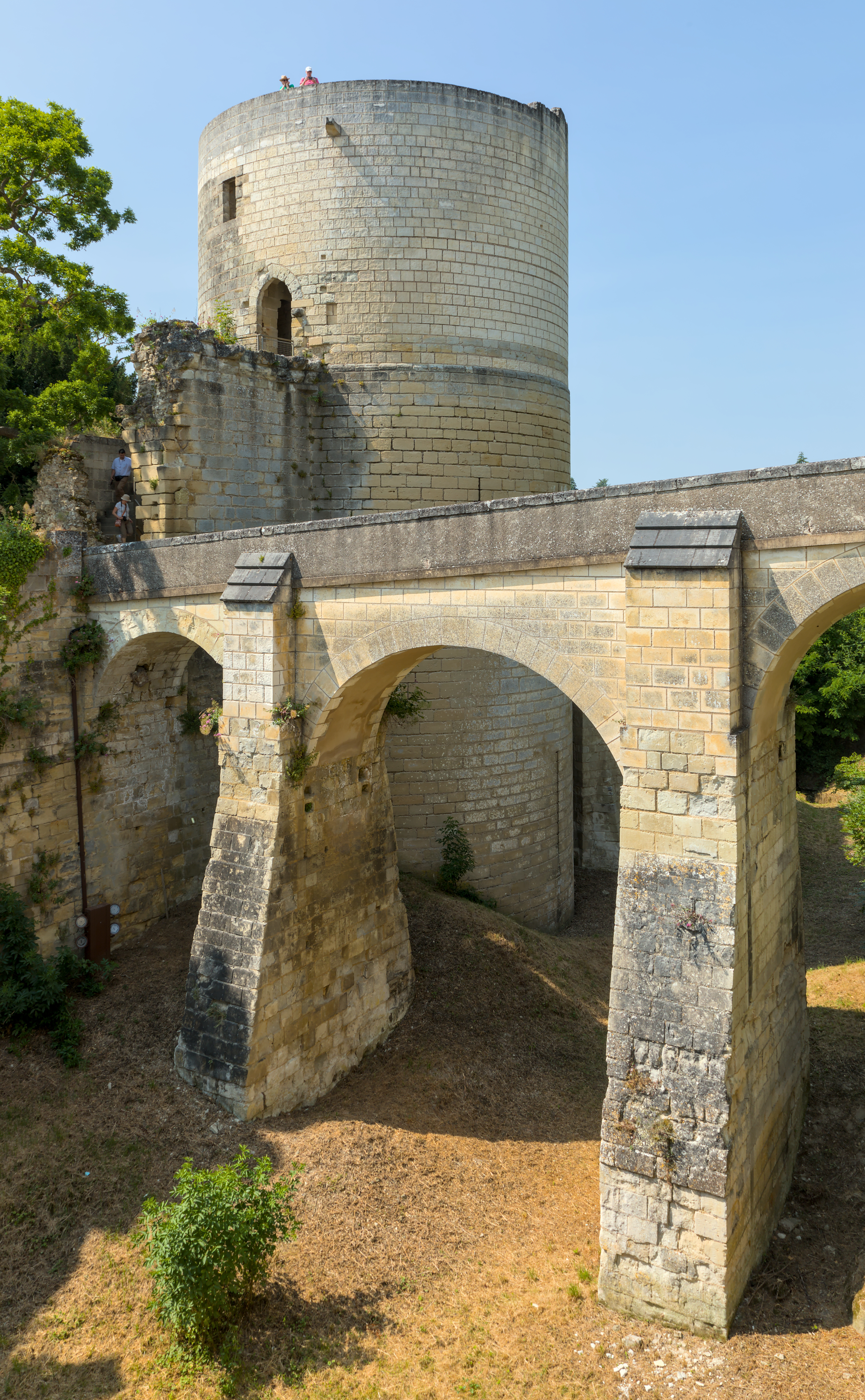
The Tour du Coudray, a keep built during the reign of Philip Augustus and used as a prison in the early 14th century

After the revolt ended in 1174, relations between Henry II and his sons continued to be strained. By 1187 Henry the Young King was dead, Richard was in line to inherit, and Henry II was on the brink of war with Philip II. In June that year Richard travelled to Paris with Philip II and struck up a friendship with the French king. Concerned his son might turn against him, Henry II asked him to return. Richard went to Chinon and raided the castle's treasury so he could fund the repair of his own castles in Aquitaine. In 1189 Richard and Philip were wreaking havoc in Maine and Toulouse, capturing Henry II's castles; the King was ill and went to the Château de Chinon. He left briefly in July to meet with Richard and Philip II and agree a truce, and died at Chinon on 6 July. The King's body was taken to Fontevraud Abbey to be buried, and Richard became king.

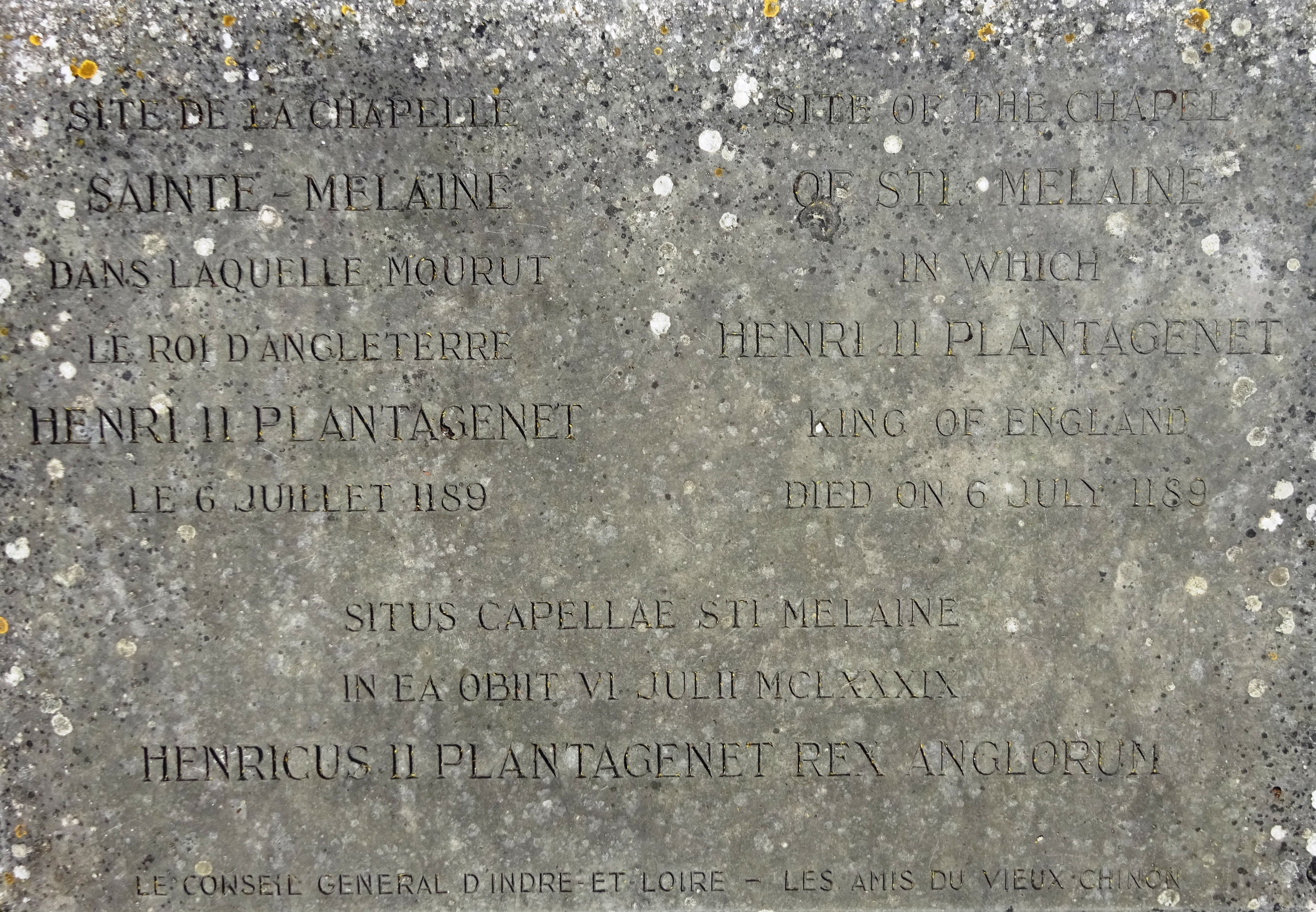
Château de Chinon - Slab on the ground at the site of St Melaine's chapel, in which Henry II of England died

In 1199, John succeeded his brother as king of England. By 1202 his lands in France were under threat from Philip II of France, threatening the east, and the barons of Brittany. In January 1203 John sent a band of mercenaries to retrieve Queen Isabelle from Chinon as it was under threat from rebels. In the spring Hubert de Burgh, 1st Earl of Kent, took over as commander of Chinon's garrison; the war was not going in John's favour and in August that year he ordered the slighting (partial demolition) of several castles, including the Château de Montrésor, to prevent them from being used by the enemy. By 1205, Chinon was one of the last intact castles in the Loire Valley. It fell to French forces in the Easter of 1205 after a siege of several months; damage to the castle meant the garrison was no longer able to hold out so it sallied out to meet the French outside the castle walls. Hubert de Burgh was injured and taken prisoner in the sortie, and would remain in captivity until 1207. Soon after the Château de Chinon was captured, Philip II took Normandy from the English crown. The French king was a prolific castle-builder and was responsible for building the cylindrical keep at Chinon, the Tour du Coudray. The round keep was typical of French design of the period, a departure from usually square keeps, and was repeated by Philip II at the castles of Dourdan, Falaise, Gisors, Laon, and Lillebonne.

=== French rule ===
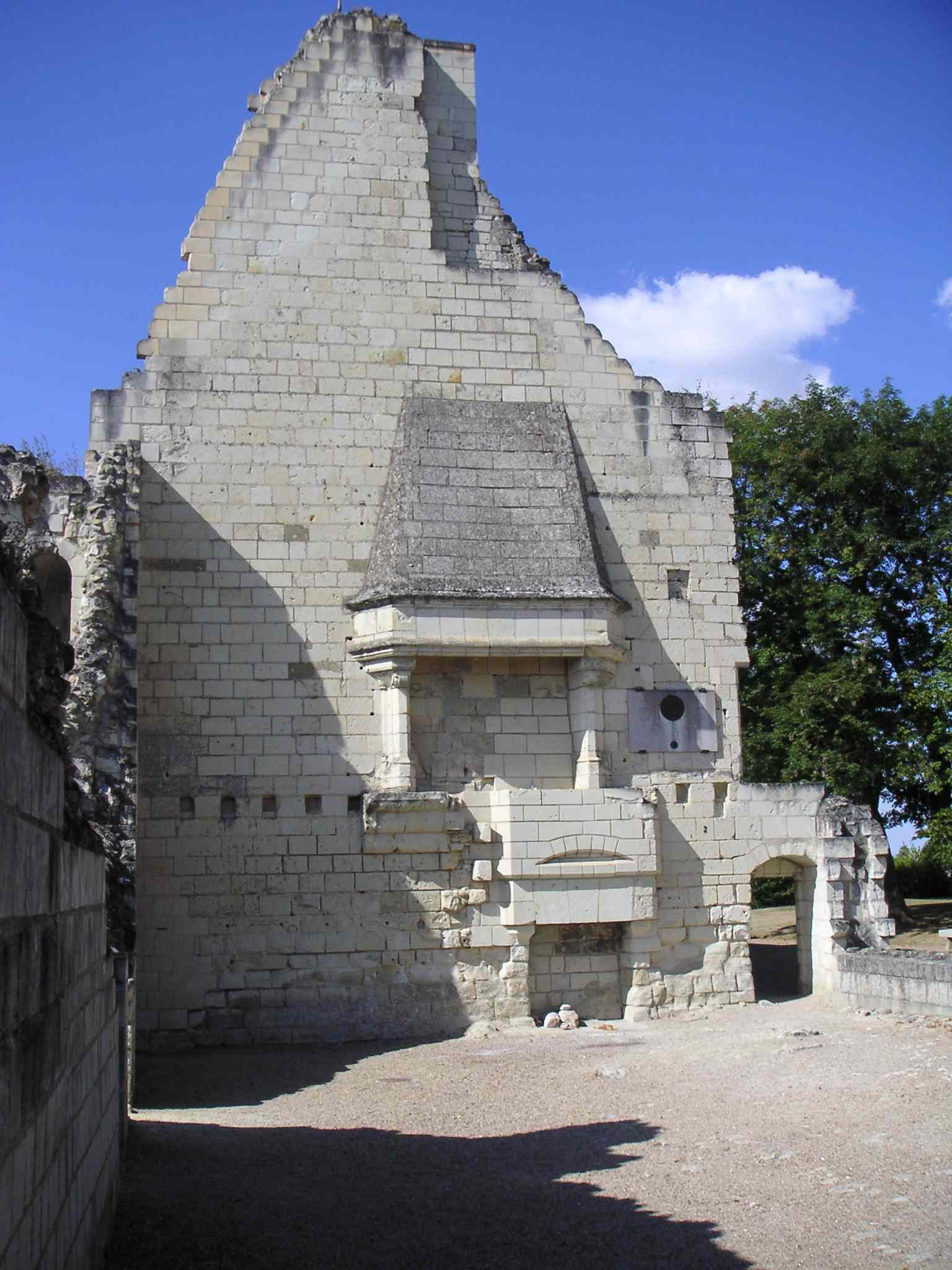
Inside the royal apartments at Chinon before they were restored in the 21st century

For a time in the 14th century the Château de Chinon was used as a prison. The Knights Templar had been founded in the Holy Land as a crusading military order in the early 12th century. By the close of the 13th century they had gained swathes of lands in Europe, particularly France. King Philip IV of France had the members of the order in his kingdom arrested, accusing them of heretical practices. The leaders of the order, including the Grand Master Jacques de Molay, were imprisoned at Château de Chinon, in the Tour du Coudray built by Philip II one century earlier. Graffiti carved by the imprisoned knights can be seen on the walls of the tower. In August 1308, Pope Clement V sent three cardinals to hear the leaders' confessions. The outcome was that in 1312 the pope issued a bull, the Vox in excelso, suppressing the order and its property was given to the Knights Hospitaller. The leaders were sentenced to life imprisonment, apart from Jacques de Molay and Geoffrey de Charney who were burnt at the stake.

The Hundred Years' War in the 14th and 15th centuries was fought between the kings of England and France over the succession to the French throne following the extinction of the main line of the House of Capet. The war ended in 1453 when the English were finally ejected from France, but in the early 15th century the English under King Henry V made significant territorial gains. The Treaty of Troyes in 1420 made Henry V the heir apparent to the French throne but when Henry predeceased the French king, Charles VI, the issue of succession was again uncertain. The English supported Henry V's son, Henry VI who was still a child, while the French supported Charles VII, the Dauphin of France. Between 1427 and 1450 Château de Chinon was the residence of Charles, when Touraine was virtually the only territory left to him in France, the rest being occupied by the Burgundians or the English.

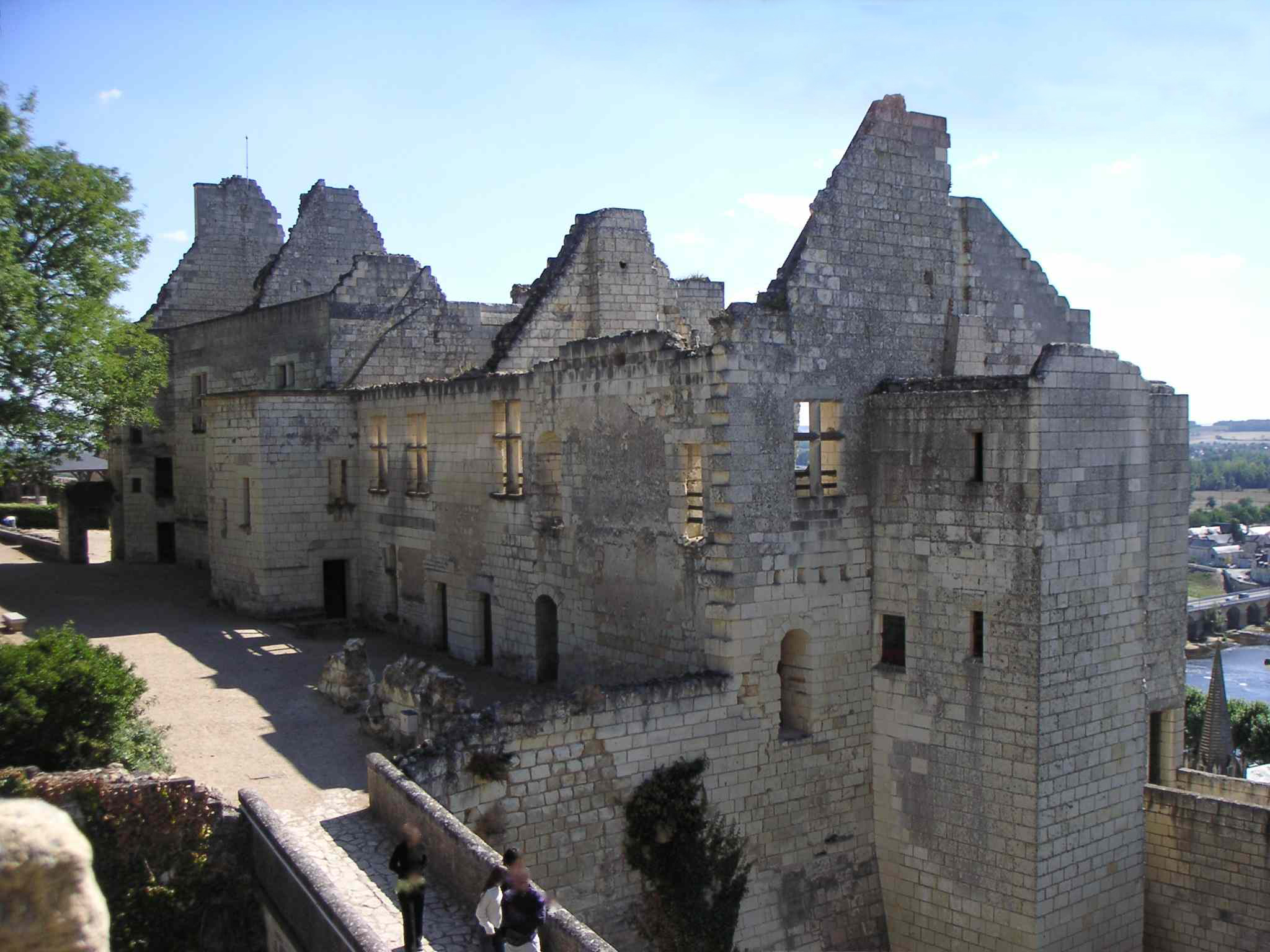
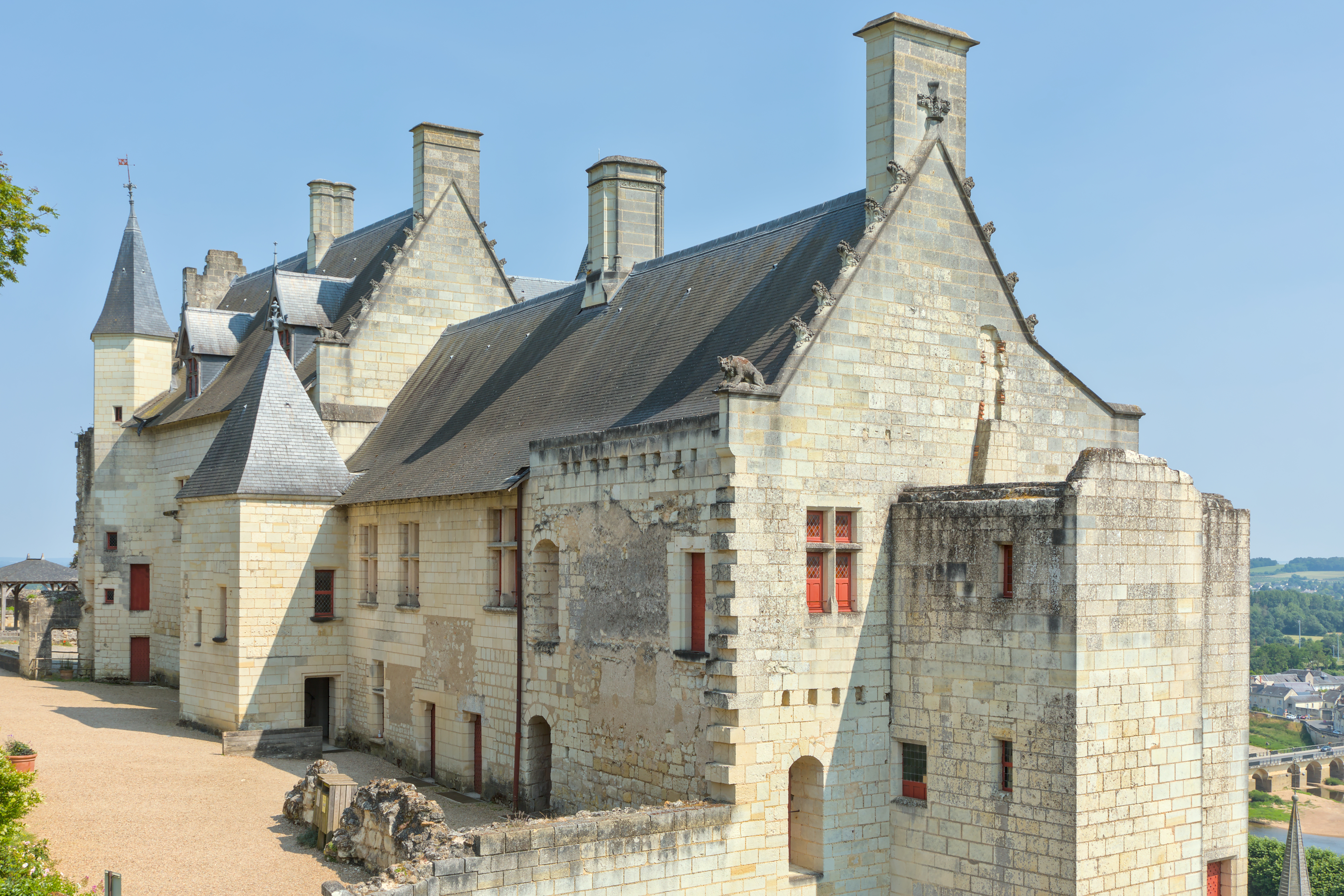
The royal apartments before and after the 21st-century restoration

On 6 March 1429, Joan of Arc arrived at Château de Chinon. She claimed to hear heavenly voices that said Charles would grant her an army to relieve the siege of Orléans. While staying at the castle she resided in the Tour du Coudray. Charles met with her two days after her arrival and then sent her to Poitiers so that she could be cross-examined to ensure she was telling the truth. Joan returned to Chinon in April where Charles granted her supplies and sent her to join the army at Orléans.

In 1562 the château came briefly into the possession of the Huguenots and was turned into a state prison by Henry IV of France. Cardinal Richelieu was given the castle to prevent it from coming under the control of unfriendly forces, though he allowed it to fall into ruin. Château de Chinon was abandoned until 1793 when, during the Reign of Terror, the castle was temporarily occupied by royalist Vendeans. Soon after, the castle lapsed back into decay.

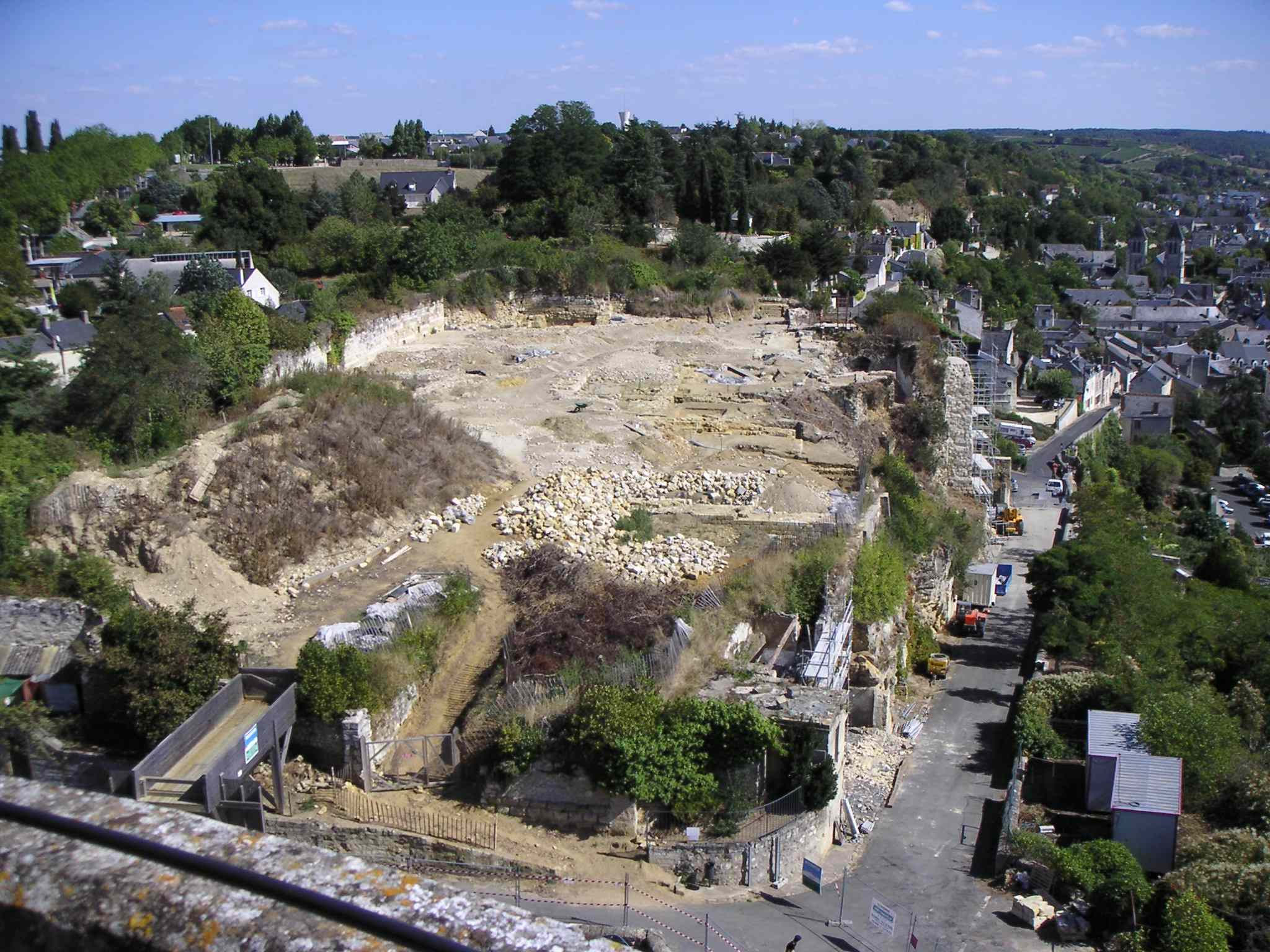
The remains of Fort Saint-Georges in 2005, before the visitor centre was built

The 19th century saw increasing public interest in France's heritage and efforts were undertaken to preserve historic buildings. In 1830 the new King Louis Philippe I created the role of Inspector-General of Historic Monuments. Prosper Mérimée, better known as a writer, assumed the position in 1834 and helped halt the decay that had set in at Château de Chinon and instigated repairs to the structure. Since 1840, the castle has been recognised as a monument historique by the French Ministry of Culture. Between 2003 and 2010 the castle was the subject of a massive excavation and restoration project, costing 14.5 million euros. It was hoped that the restored castle would attract 250,000 tourists a year with a visitor centre built in the Fort St-George. Before the visitor centre was built, the site was the subject of an archaeological excavation which covered nearly 4,000 square metres (43,000 sq ft), unearthing the entire interior of the fort. The royal lodgings (logis royales) which were roofless for two hundred years, were restored inside and out and given a mock 15th-century interior. In addition about 150 metres (490 ft) of the ramparts were also restored as well as the Tour du Coudray. Today, it is owned and managed by the Indre-et-Loire General Council and is a major tourist attraction.

== Description ==
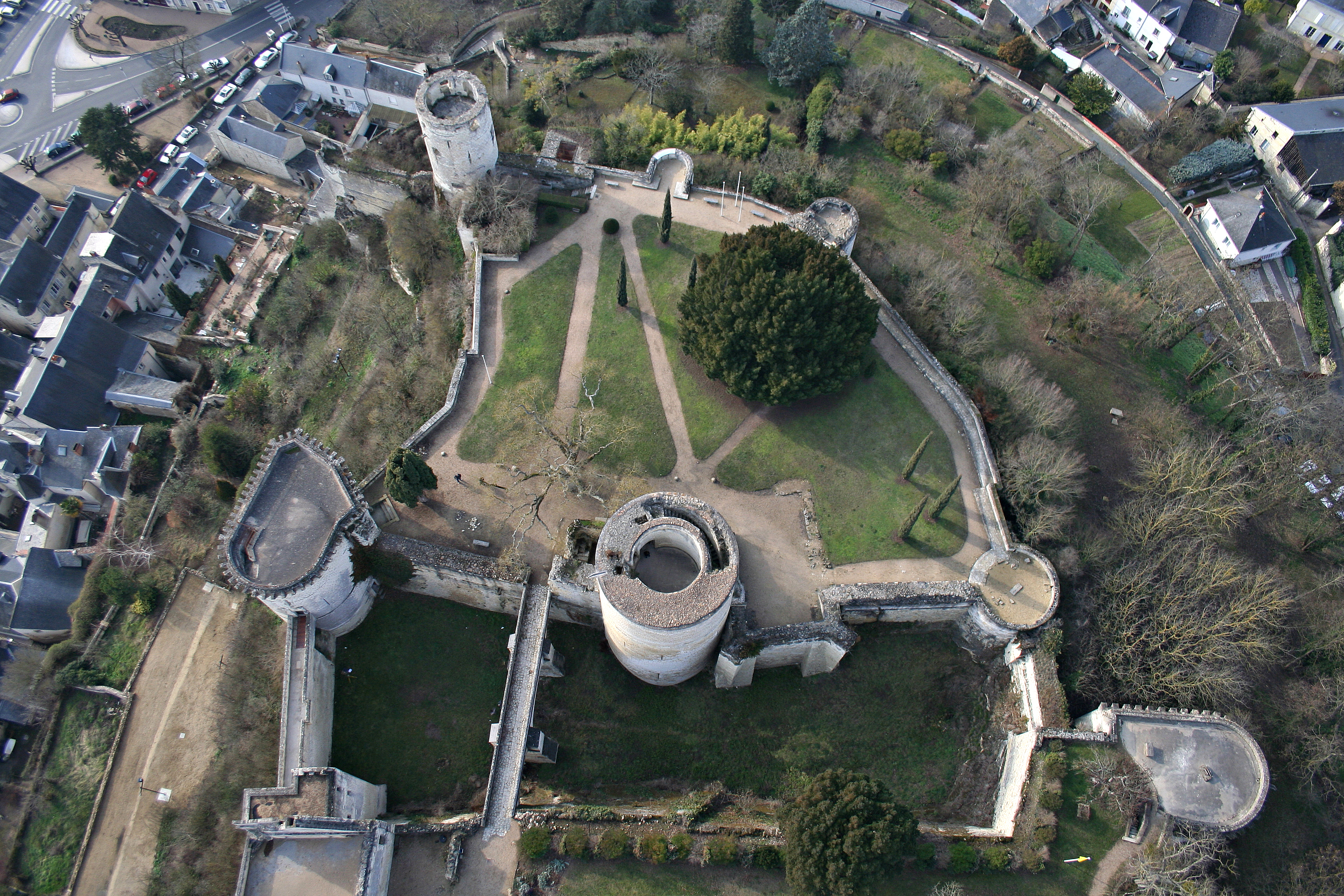
The Fort du Coudray, the castle's westernmost enclosure

Standing on a rocky outcrop above the river Vienne, Château de Chinon has natural defences on three sides and a ditch dug along the fourth. Writing in the 12th century, the chronicler William of Newburgh commented that even before Château de Chinon came under the control of Henry II "its strength was such that nature seemed to vie with human art in fortifying and defending it". That said, in the 12th century Henry II undertook a project of rebuilding the castle and much of the extant remains date from this period. The stone used to build the castle was quarried on the site.

The castle is divided, along its length, into three enclosures, each separated by a deep dry moat. There are some similarities with Château Gaillard, built by Richard the Lionheart in the closing years of the 12th century, which also consists of three enclosures and sits on a promontory above a nearby town.

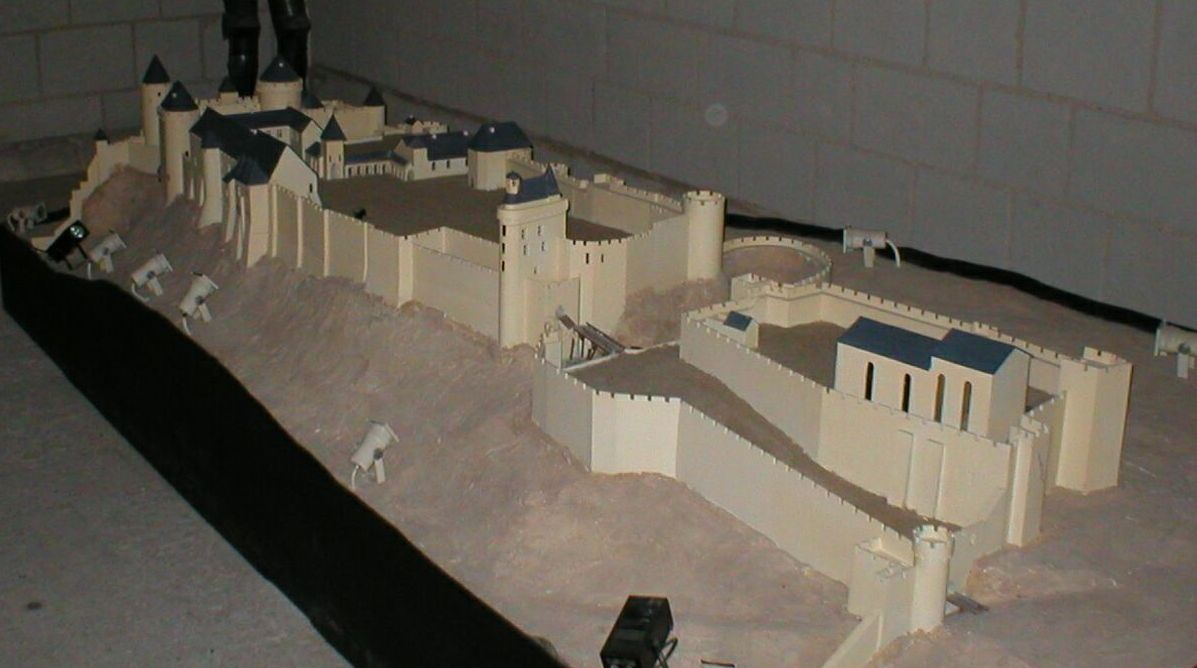
Museum model of how the château may have appeared

The easternmost enclosure is known as Fort St-Georges, the central is the Château du Milieu (the middle castle), while the westernmost is known as the Fort du Coudray. The Fort St-George was built under Henry II and contained a chapel dedicated to St George, England's patron saint. The Château du Coudray was added by Philip II in the early 13th century, while the Château de Milieu was built in the 12th and 14th centuries. The round Tour du Coudray built by Philip II (which has parallels at Dourdan, Falaise, Gisors, Laon, and Lillebonne) guarded the bridge linking the Fort du Coudray and the Château de Milieu. While the curtain wall stands in many places, the buildings within the château do not survive to the same extent, and in many cases little more can be said about them than the location of their foundations and possible use.

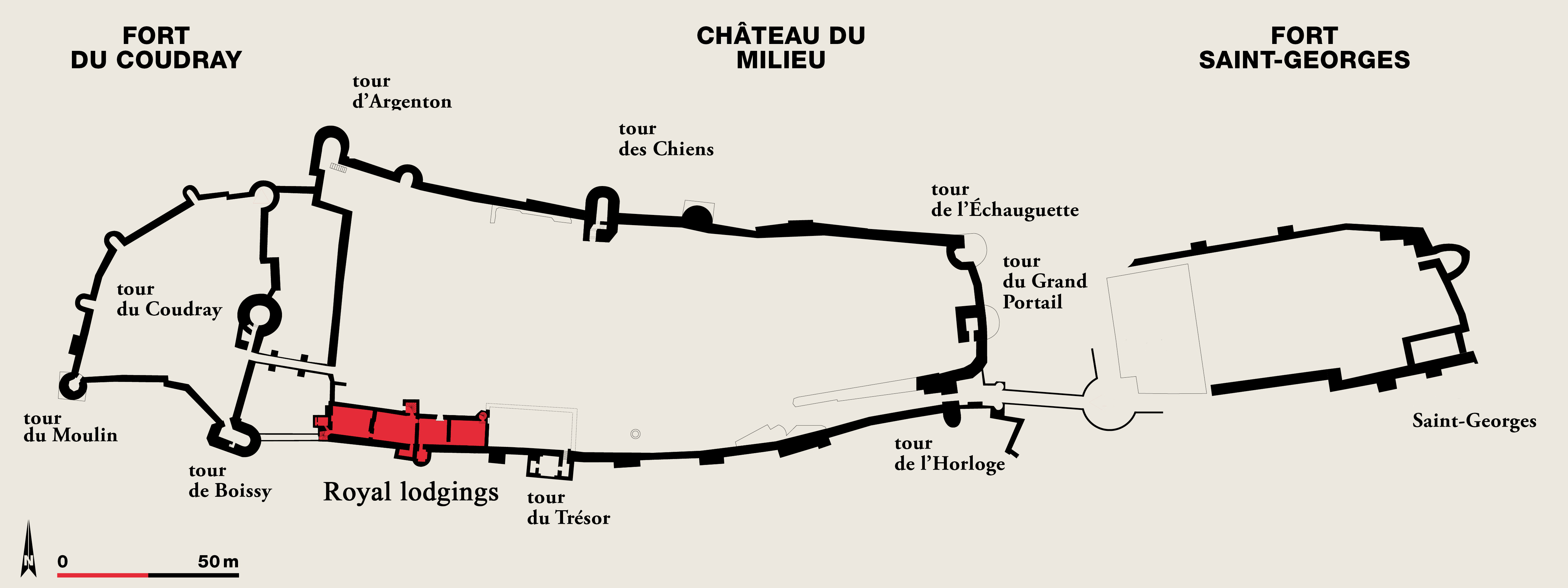
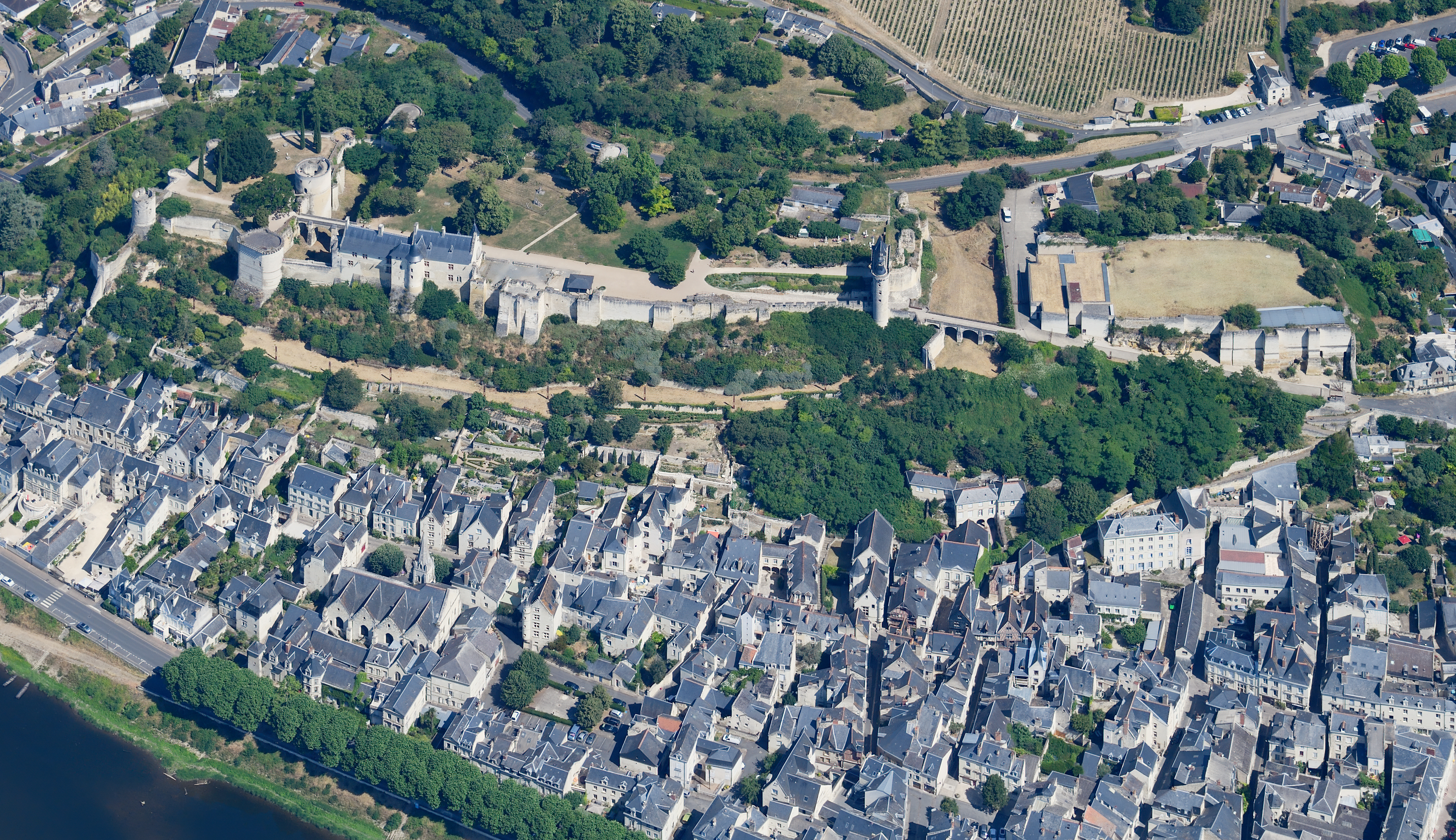

== See also ==
- Châteaux of the Loire Valley
- List of castles in France
