= Shaftesbury Abbey =

Abbey in Shaftesbury, Dorset

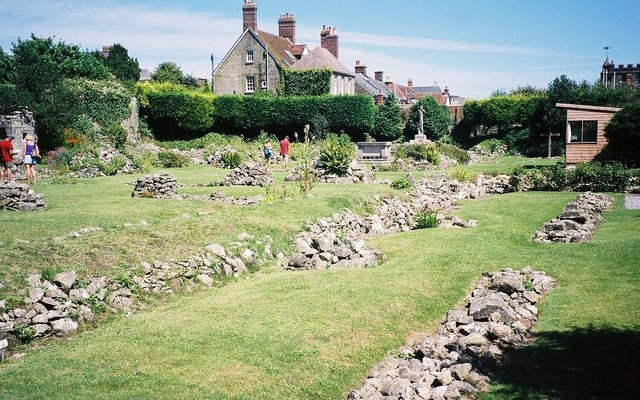
- Shaftesbury Abbey ruins

- Location within Dorset
- Interactive map of Shaftesbury Abbey

Monastery information
- Order: Benedictine
- Established: c. 888
- Disestablished: 1539

People
- Founder: King Alfred the Great

Site
- Location: Shaftesbury, Dorset, England
- Coordinates: 51°00′19″N 2°11′55″W

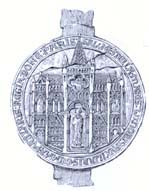
The great seal of Shaftesbury Abbey

Shaftesbury Abbey was an abbey that housed nuns in Shaftesbury, Dorset. It was founded in about 888, and dissolved in 1539 during the English Reformation by the order of Thomas Cromwell, minister to King Henry VIII. At the time it was the second-wealthiest nunnery in England, behind only Syon Abbey in west London.

== History ==
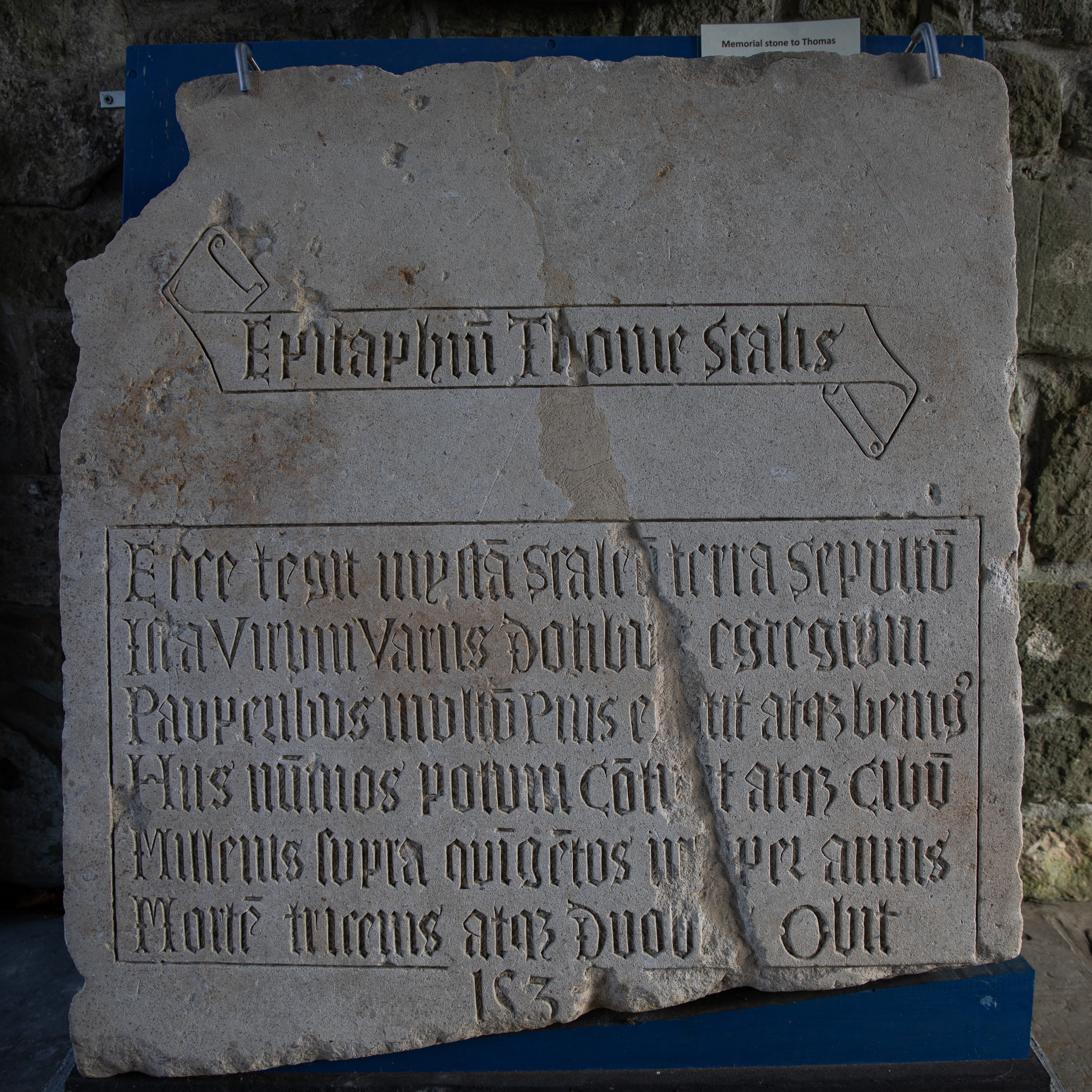
Grave slab of Sir Thomas Scales, Deacon of the High Altar at Shaftesbury Abbey, died 1532. Found during excavation of the nave in 1931.

Alfred the Great founded the convent in about 888 and installed his daughter Æthelgifu as the first abbess. Ælfgifu, the wife of Alfred's grandson, King Edmund I, was buried at Shaftesbury and soon venerated as a saint, and she came to be regarded by the house as its true founder.

The bones of St Edward the Martyr were translated from Wareham and received at the abbey with great ceremony. The translation of the relics was overseen by St Dunstan and Ælfhere, Ealdorman of Mercia. This occurred in a great procession beginning on 13 February 981; the relics arrived at Shaftesbury seven days later. The relics were received by the nuns of the abbey and were buried with full royal honours on the north side of the altar. The account of the translation reports that on the way from Wareham to Shaftesbury, a miracle had taken place: when two crippled men were brought close to the bier and those carrying it lowered the body to their level, the cripples were immediately restored to full health. This procession and events were re-enacted 1000 years later in 1981. Reports from Shaftesbury of many other miracles said to have been obtained through Edward's intercession helped establish the abbey as a place of pilgrimage.

In 1001, it was recorded that the tomb in which St Edward lay was observed regularly to rise from the ground. King Æthelred instructed the bishops to raise his brother's tomb from the ground and place it into a more fitting place. The bishops moved the relics to a casket, placed in the holy place of the saints together with other holy relics. This elevation of the relics of Edward took place on 20 June 1001.

Shaftesbury Abbey was rededicated to the Mother of God and St Edward. Many miracles were claimed at the tomb of St Edward, including the healing of lepers and the blind. The abbey became the wealthiest Benedictine nunnery in England, a major pilgrimage site, and the town's central focus. A large grange, Place Farm was established at Tisbury to administer the abbey’s Wiltshire estates. William of Malmesbury, in his Gesta regum Anglorum, praised the abbey residents' "steadfast preservation of their purity" and the fervency and effectiveness of their prayers. In 1093, shortly before his election as archbishop, Anselm of Canterbury wrote a letter to Eulalia, who was abbess at the time, requesting their prayers for him; medieval scholar and historian Katie Ann-Marie Bugyis states that it demonstrates his "confidence in the promptness and solicitude" of their prayers. Anselm wrote another letter to Shaftesbury ten years later, which suggests that Eulalia had responded to him and told him that the community had granted his request for prayer; he also thanked them for their prayers for him during his exile from England and asked for their continued intercession as he returned.

In 1240 Cardinal Otto Candidus, the legate to the Apostolic See of Pope Gregory IX, visited the abbey and confirmed a charter of 1191, the first entered in the Glastonbury chartulary. Elizabeth de Burgh, Queen of Scots was imprisoned here from October 1312 to March 1313. By 1340, the steward of the abbess swore in the town's mayor.

=== Dissolution ===
At the time of the Dissolution of the Monasteries, a common saying quoted by Bishop Thomas Fuller conjectured "if the abbess of Shaftesbury and the abbot of Glastonbury Abbey had been able to wed, their son would have been richer than the King of England" because of the lands which it had been bequeathed. It was too rich a prize for Thomas Cromwell to pass up on behalf of King Henry VIII.

In 1539, the last abbess, Elizabeth Zouche, signed a deed of surrender, the abbey was demolished, and its lands sold, leading to a temporary decline in the town.

=== Burials ===
- Ælfgifu of Shaftesbury
- Edward the Martyr

== In literature ==
Thomas Hardy wrote of the abbey ruins:

Vague imaginings of its castle, its three mints, its magnificent apsidal Abbey, the chief glory of south Wessex, its twelve churches, its shrines, chantries, hospitals, its gabled freestone mansions—all now ruthlessly swept away—throw the visitor, even against his will, into a pensive melancholy which the stimulating atmosphere and limitless landscape around him can scarcely dispel.

A novel based on the dissolution of the abbey, The Butcher's Daughter, by Victoria Glendinning was published in 2018.

Shaftesbury Abbey appears in The Mirror & the Light, the final part of Hilary Mantel's trilogy covering the life of Thomas Cromwell, published in 2020. There is an important scene where Cromwell meets Dorothea Clancy/Dorothy Clusey, the illegitimate daughter of Cardinal Wolsey, and Abbess Elizabeth Zouche. Both nuns are real historical figures, though it is not known whether Cromwell ever visited Shaftesbury Abbey.

Matrix is a 2021 historical novel by Lauren Groff about Abbess Mary of Shaftesbury, supposed by some historians to be the author Marie de France.

== List of abbesses ==
The list that follows is clearly incomplete. Unless specified, the dates given are those of mentions in the historic record.

- Elfgiva or Æthelgeofu or Algiva (first abbess about 888)
- Ælfthrith (948)
- Herleva (966; died 982)
- Alfrida (1001 or 1009)
- Leueua (in the reign of Edward the Confessor)
- Eulalia (appointed 1074)
- Eustachia
- Cecilia (perhaps appointed 1107)
- Emma
- Mary (1189)
- J. (elected 1216)
- Amicia Russell (elected 1223)
- Agnes Lungespee (elected 1243)
- Agnes de Ferrers (elected 1247)
- Juliana de Bauceyn (died 1279)
- Laurentia de Muscegros (elected 1279; died 1290)
- Joan de Bridport (elected 1290; died 1291)
- Mabel Gifford (elected 1291, died 1302)
- Alice de Lavyngton (elected 1302; died 1315)
- Margaret Aucher (elected 1315, died 1329)
- Dionisia le Blunde (elected 1329, died 1345)
- Joan Duket (elected 1345, died 1350)
- Margaret de Leukenore (elected 1350)
- Joan Formage (elected 1362, died 1394)
- Egelina de Counteville (appointed 1395)
- Cecilia Fovent (1398, died 1423)
- Margaret Stourton (elected 1423; died 1441). She was the sister of John Stourton (died 1438) of Preston Plucknett in Somerset, seven times MP for Somerset, in 1419, 1420, December 1421, 1423, 1426, 1429 and 1435.
- Edith Bonham (elected 1441; died 1460)
- Margaret St. John (elected 1460)
- Alice Gibbes (died 1496)
- Margaret Twyneo (elected 1496; died 1505)
- Elizabeth Shelford (elected 1505; died 1528)
- Elizabeth Zouche or Zuche, elected 1529 and forced to surrender the abbey in 1539

== Shaftesbury Abbey Museum ==
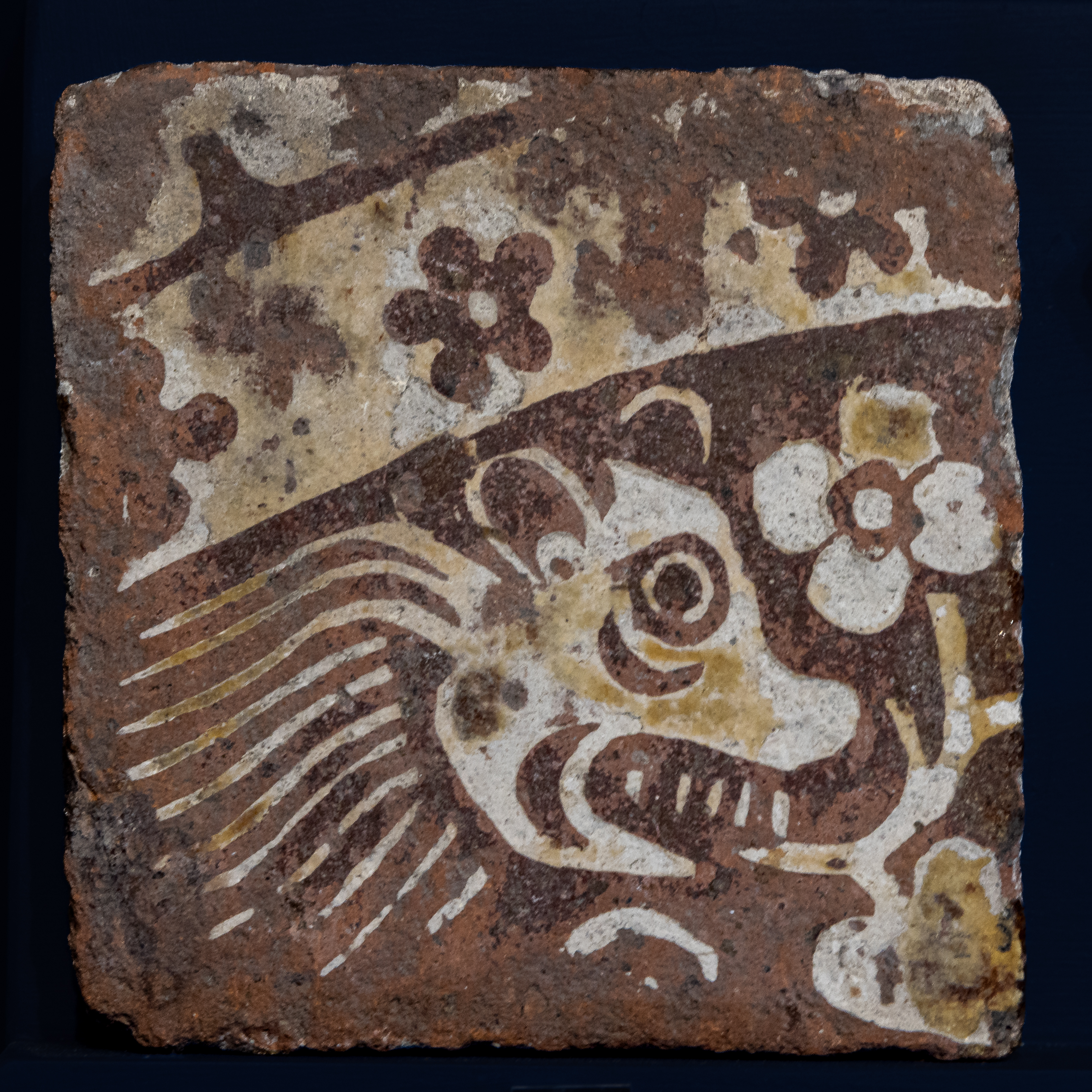
Lion and Flower Floor Tile from Shaftesbury Abbey collection

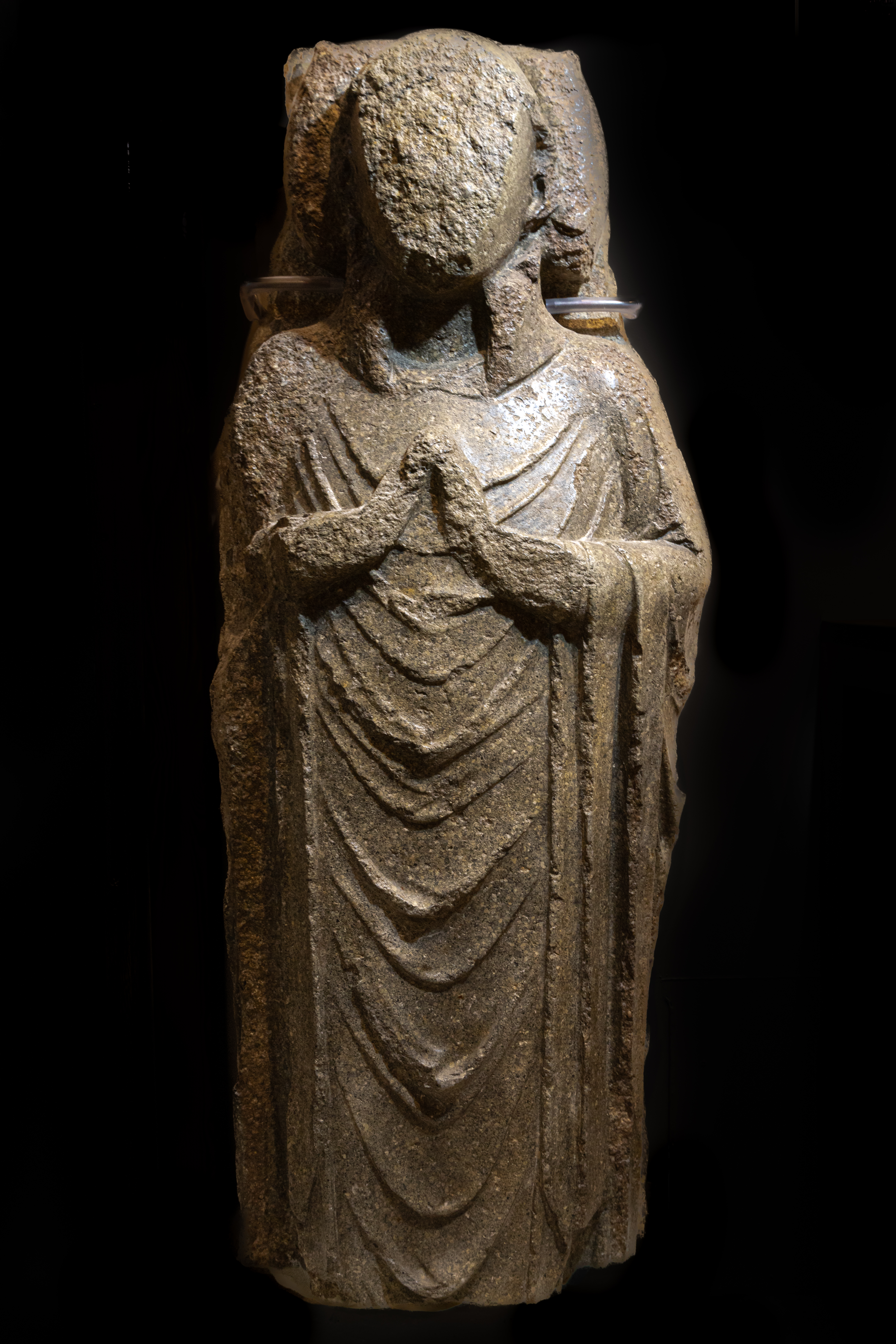
Priest Coffin Lid carved in Purbeck Marble from Shaftesbury Abbey collection

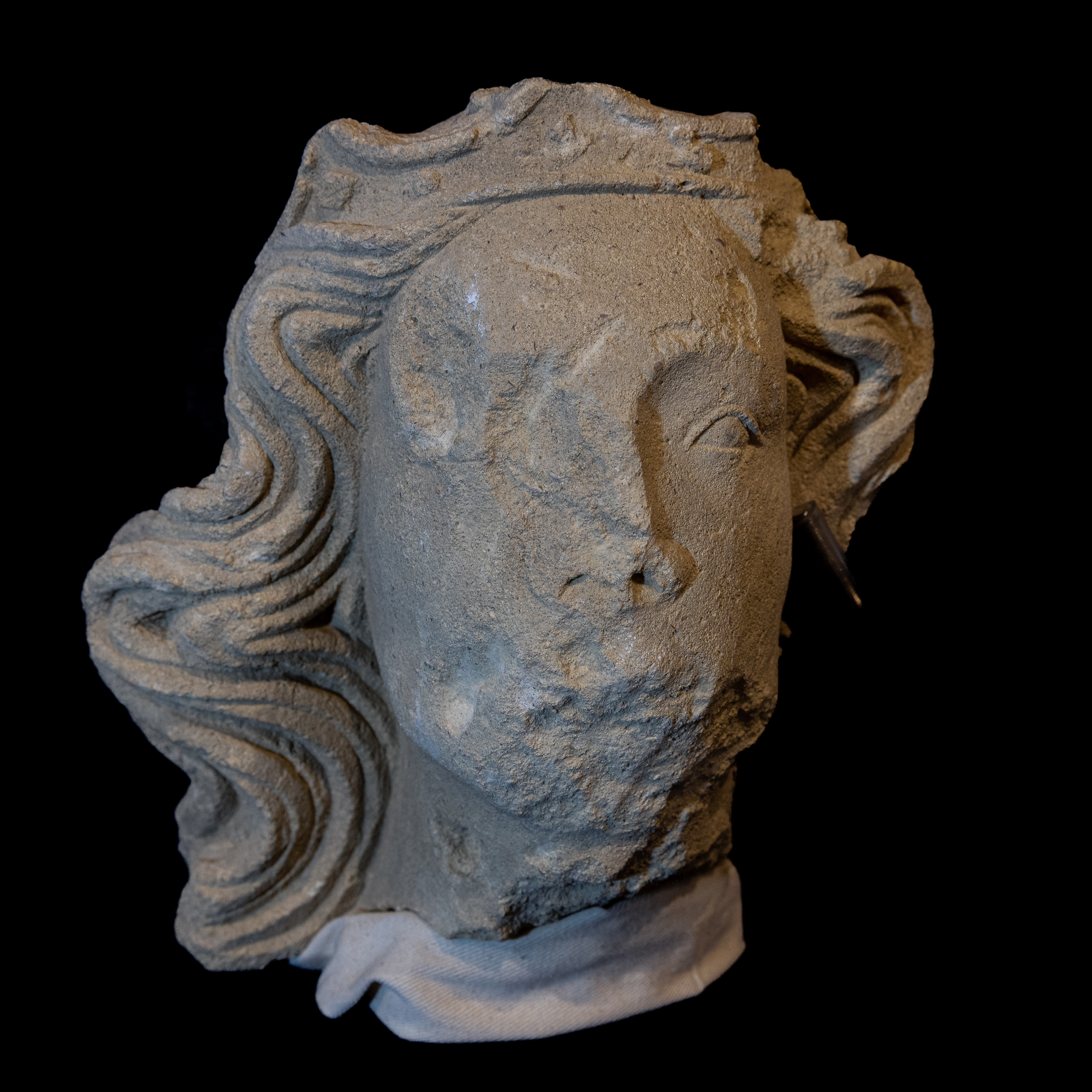
Royal Head Sculpture found in 2019 SAVED Excavations from the Shaftesbury Abbey collection

Shaftesbury Abbey Museum features stonework pieces excavated from the abbey's ruins, including Anglo-Saxon carvings and medieval floor tiles. Exhibits tell the story of the Benedictine convent and its inhabitants. The museum is open from April through October, and the site also features a medieval period garden and orchard.

== The site today ==
The site of Shaftesbury Abbey is used to host events including open air viewings of films, drama workshops and performances, as well as historical lectures. It is also the home of the music showcase that takes place during the town's "Gold Hill Fair" in early July and provides a platform for local music.
