= William FitzEmpress =

French nobleman (1136–1164)

- Viscount of Dieppe
- Born: 22 July 1136; Argentan, Normandy
- Died: 30 January 1164 (aged 27); Rouen, Normandy
- Burial: Cathedral of Notre-Dame, Rouen
- House: Plantagenet/Angevin
- Father: Geoffrey Plantagenet, Count of Anjou
- Mother: Empress Matilda

William FitzEmpress (22 July 1136 – 30 January 1164) was the youngest of the three sons of Empress Matilda and Geoffrey Plantagenet, Count of Anjou. His brothers were Henry II of England and Geoffrey, Count of Nantes.

== Early life ==
William Fitzempress, also known as William of Anjou, was born in 1136, the third and youngest son of Count Geoffrey V of Anjou and his wife, Empress Matilda, the daughter of the late English King Henry I of England. He was born in the time known as The Anarchy, an 18-year civil war that disputed the succession of the English crown between his mother Matilda, the late king's daughter, and her cousin Stephen of Blois. William would have seen little of either of his parents, for, while his father fought in Normandy, his mother campaigned in England. William's eldest brother, Prince Henry Curtmantle, would also join the campaign at age 14 in 1147 (when William was still 11). Henry would later be made Duke of Normandy in 1150 by their father, after the latter had subdued the duchy.

In 1151, Count Geoffrey died suddenly at age 38, leaving his wife and three teenage sons, with Henry becoming the new head of the Angevin Dynasty. According to the deceased Count's will, Anjou would go to Henry until he became King of England, upon which the second brother, Geoffrey, Count of Nantes, would receive Anjou. The war continued until 1153, when the aging Stephen, now around 61 years old, came to an agreement with William's eldest brother Henry that respected Stephen's right to reign for the rest of his life but on the condition that the young Henry be his successor. Stephen died a year later, in 1154, and William's brother became King Henry II of England.

== Career ==
In 1156, aged 20, William was with his brother Henry at the siege of Chinon. This siege was occasioned by the rebellion of their brother Geoffrey. He also conducted the siege at the castle of Mountreuil-Bellay. While doing so he had the writings of the Roman military theorist Vegetius read to him; he then did what Vegetius had done, and the siege ended the next day.

In September 1155, King Henry held a council at Winchester where he enthusiastically considered invading Ireland and giving it to William, making him king. The plans were abandoned when their mother, Empress Matilda, objected: she did not consider Ireland worth conquering. Henry did, however, and he made William one of the richest men in England, granting him seven manors (Maldon in Essex; Dartford, Hoo, and Shorne in Kent; Aylsham and Cawston in Norfolk; and Hintlesham in Suffolk). He also had land surrounding Dieppe, Normandy, of which he was made vicomte.

== Obstruction ==
In 1162, William was to marry Isabel de Warenne, Countess of Surrey, one of the great heiresses in England. Their prohibited degree of affinity was counted from her as widow through her deceased husband William of Blois, a double second cousin of William's. The men's maternal grandmothers were siblings and FitzEmpress's maternal grandfather was the sibling of Blois's paternal grandmother. Because of this relationship, the marriage required a dispensation from affinity; such dispensations were usually granted without difficulty. However Thomas Becket, Archbishop of Canterbury, refused to support the request for a dispensation and it was not granted because of that. In 1164, Isabel married William's half brother Hamelin of Anjou.

== Death ==
William died suddenly shortly thereafter, reputedly of a broken heart, and was buried in the Cathedral of Notre-Dame in Rouen. His brother Henry blamed Becket for William's death, and this might well have been the beginning of the great conflict between them. When Becket was murdered 29 December 1170, one of the assailants was Richard le Breton who had been a knight in William's employ. When Breton delivered his fatal blow he shouted, "Take that, for the love of my lord William, the king's brother!"

== Possible marriage ==
According to some French genealogies, William FitzEmpress was also called William Touremine and married to Constance of Penthièvre, a sister of the Duke of Brittany Conan IV. They claim him as founder of the House of Tournemine as father of Oliver I and Geoffrey of Tournemine. However, there is no evidence for this marriage, and no evidence of William Tournemine's identity either. (Note: Several theories about the identity of the founder of the House of Tournemine exist but most of them are contradicted by historical facts. Anatole de Barthélemy mentions some of them: (1) the first Tournemine was an Edward Tournemine, nephew of the King of England, who fought with Peter Mauclerc against the King of France and married Peter’s younger sister Constance; (2) Edward Tournemine, an English captain, was sent to Brittany by Henry II of England to help Conan IV fighting his step-father Odo and the grateful Duke gave him estates in Brittany as well as his sister Constance’s hand in marriage; (3) the first lord of Tournemine married the younger sister of Guy of Thouars, Constance of Brittany's third husband; (4) William FitzEmpress, Henry II’s younger brother, married Conan IV’s sister Constance)
