= Mary of Shaftesbury =

Medieval abbess in England (died 1215/1216)

Mary (died 1215/16) was an abbess of Shaftesbury Abbey during the 12th century, from at least 1181 to 1215. She was the illegitimate daughter of Count Geoffrey V of Anjou, thus the half-sister of King Henry II of England. It is possible that she may have been the same person as Marie of France, but it is not known for certain. She became abbess sometime in the 1170s or 1180s and died in 1215 or 1216.

Several charters relating to the abbey in that period bear Mary's name.
