= Elizabeth Shelford =

Elizabeth Shelford (died 1528) was abbess of Shaftesbury Abbey from 1505-1528. She was the second-last person to serve as Abbess before the monastery's closure under Henry VIII's dissolution.

During her time as Abbess, a book called the 'Book of Hours' was made for her, which included history and dates of the Abbey's history. The book was later taken to the United States before being moved to the Fitzwilliam Museum in Cambridge. The book contains Elizabeth Shelford's 'ES' monogram, her rebus which is a scallop shell over water - 'shell-ford', and records of her election as abbess (25 June) and her subsequent benediction (12 July).
