= Ælthelfreda =

Ælthelfreda (also Ælthelthryth or Ælthelflæd) may have been the abbess of Shaftesbury at the beginning of the second millennium. During her time as abbess, the relics of Edward the Martyr, held in Shaftesbury, seem to have been translated from a place north of the principal altar to another spot within the sanctuary of the abbey's church. The translation was recorded to have occurred on 20 June 1001. This translation may have been done in response to Viking raids, which made the Anglo-Saxons believe that they needed to bestow greater honours on the relics of saints to gain God's favour; after the translation took place, the Vikings who were in Devon stayed where they were, and then returned to their base on the Isle of Wight.

Shaftesbury was one of several late Saxon churches established in Wessex around this time, along with Winchester Nunnaminster, Romsey, Wherwell, Amesbury and Wilton. In 1001 Ælthelred gave Bradford-on-Avon in wiltshire to the Shaftesbury nuns, to serve as a refuge for them and for the relics.
