= Geoffrey, Count of Nantes =

French nobleman (1134–1158)

Geoffrey
- Count of Nantes
- Born: 1 June 1134; Rouen or Argentan, Normandy
- Died: 27 July 1158 (aged 24); Nantes
- House: Plantagenet
- Father: Geoffrey Plantagenet, Count of Anjou
- Mother: Empress Matilda

Geoffrey VI (1 June 1134 – 27 July 1158) was Count of Nantes from 1156 to 1158. He was also known as Geoffrey of Anjou and Geoffrey FitzEmpress. He was the son of Geoffrey Plantagenet and Empress Matilda. His brothers were Henry II of England and William FitzEmpress.

== Family ==
Born in Rouen in 1134, he was the second of the three sons of Empress Matilda, a claimant to the English throne during the Anarchy, and Count Geoffrey V of Anjou. His birth was difficult and his mother was close to dying.

== Conflict ==
It was said that in his will, Geoffrey V had stipulated that his second son, Geoffrey, would become count of Anjou and Maine if the eldest, Henry Curtmantle, managed to become king of England. In the meantime, he granted Geoffrey the castles at Chinon, Loudun, Mirebeau and Montsoreau. The body of the count would remain unburied until Henry agreed to the terms of the will. The story was reported in contemporary sources only in a minor chronicle in Tours; W. L. Warren makes the case that the story was invented by Geoffrey. Thomas K. Keefe, however, finds serious fault with Warren's argument, arguing that there are no reliable grounds to believe that the story of Geoffrey V's will is untrue, and considers it likely that Henry usurped the County of Anjou.

In March 1152, Geoffrey attempted to abduct Duchess Eleanor of Aquitaine as she traveled from Beaugency to Poitiers after the annulment of her marriage to King Louis VII of France; she avoided his trap when she was forewarned. He lay in wait at Port des Piles, near the river Creuse, and would have married her had the abduction been successful. In June, he allied himself with King Louis, the king's brother Count Robert I of Dreux and the brothers Counts Henry I of Champagne and Theobald V of Blois when Louis attacked Normandy as a response to the marriage of Geoffrey's brother Henry Curtmantle to Eleanor of Aquitaine, which took place without Louis' knowledge. If successful, the five of them intended to divide the lands of Henry and Eleanor amongst themselves.

In late 1153 or in 1154, Theobald V of Blois invaded Touraine, which Henry regarded as his. Geoffrey and others were taken captive, and Theobald required Henry to destroy the castle of Chaumont-sur-Loire to obtain their freedom. Geoffrey accompanied Henry and Eleanor to England when King Stephen died in December 1154.

In the summer of 1156, Geoffrey was again making trouble for Henry and Henry laid siege to the castles of Chinon, Mirebeau, Loudun and Montsoreau. Geoffrey was forced to yield them, but, according to some sources, he was able to keep Loudun. Henry gave Geoffrey an annuity of £1500 for the other two castles. Shortly after that siege ended the people of Nantes deposed their count and asked King Henry whom they should invite to fill the vacancy. He suggested Geoffrey; the offer was made and accepted. After Geoffrey's death his county was seized by Conan IV of Brittany, who subsequently ceded it to Henry.

== Death ==
Geoffrey died suddenly at Nantes in 1158.

Regnal titles
Preceded by Hoel III	Count of Nantes; 1156-1158	Succeeded by Conan III
