= Geoffrey V of Anjou =

French nobleman (1113–1151)

Geoffrey Plantagenet
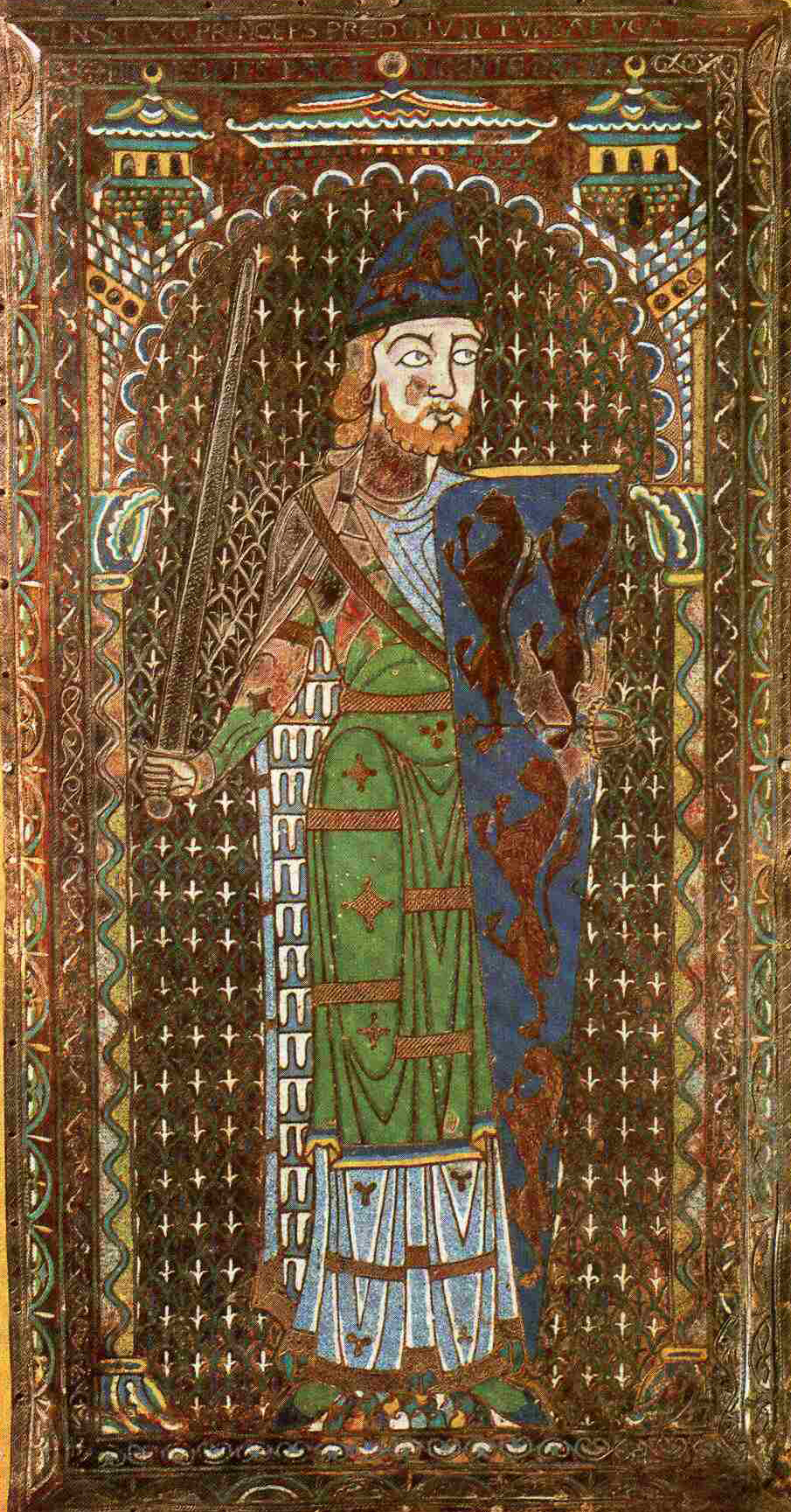
- Enamel effigy from Geoffrey's tomb at Le Mans. His decorated shield suggests early origins of the three lions of the Royal Arms of England.

Count of Anjou
- Reign: 1129 – 7 September 1151
- Predecessor: Fulk the Younger
- Successor: Henry II of England

Duke of Normandy
- Reign: 1144–1150
- Predecessor: Stephen
- Successor: Henry II
- Born: 24 August 1113
- Died: 7 September 1151 (aged 38); Château-du-Loir, France
- Burial: Le Mans Cathedral, Le Mans
- Spouse: Matilda of England (m. 1128)
- Issue Detail: Henry II, King of England; Geoffrey, Count of Nantes; William, Viscount of Dieppe; Illegitimate: Hamelin, Earl of Surrey; Emma of Anjou; Mary, Abbess of Shaftesbury
- House: Ingelger (by birth); Plantagenet (founder)
- Father: Fulk, King of Jerusalem
- Mother: Eremburga, Countess of Maine

Geoffrey V (24 August 1113 – 7 September 1151), called the Fair (French: le Bel) or Plantagenet, was the count of Anjou and Maine by inheritance from 1129, and also duke of Normandy by his marriage claim and conquest, from 1144.

Geoffrey married Empress Matilda, daughter of Henry I, king of England and duke of Normandy. Geoffrey and Matilda's marriage led, through their son Henry II, to the 300-year long reign of the Plantagenet dynasty in England. Although it was never his family name or last name, "Plantagenet" was taken for the dynasty from Geoffrey's epithet, long after his death. Geoffrey's ancestral domain of Anjou in north central France gives rise to the name Angevin, and what modern historians name as the Angevin Empire in the 12th century.

== Early life ==
Geoffrey was the elder son of Fulk V of Anjou and Ermengarde of Maine. The chronicler John of Marmoutier described Geoffrey as handsome, red haired, jovial, and a great warrior. King Henry I of England, having heard reports on Geoffrey's talents and prowess, sent legates to Anjou to negotiate a marriage between his 25-year-old daughter Matilda and Geoffrey. Consent was obtained from both parties, and on 10 June 1128 King Henry I, who was also the duke of Normandy, knighted the 15-year-old Geoffrey in preparation for the wedding. Geoffrey of Anjou perhaps received the nickname Plantagenet (much later used for the royal dynasty that resulted from this marriage) from the yellow sprig of broom blossom (genêt is the French name for the planta genista, or broom shrub) he wore in his hat.

== Marriage ==
Geoffrey and Matilda's marriage took place in 1128. The marriage was meant to seal a lasting peace between England, Normandy and Anjou. She was eleven years older than Geoffrey and very proud of her status as dowager empress (as opposed to being a mere countess), which she kept for the remainder of her life. Their relationship was a stormy but happy one with frequent long separations. Matilda returned to her father's court after only a few months. Upon intervention from King Henry I, Matilda returned to Geoffrey, and Matilda became pregnant with their first son, the future King Henry II, not long after. They had three sons Henry, Geoffrey and William.

== Count of Anjou ==
The year after the marriage, Geoffrey's father, Fulk, left on crusade for Jerusalem (where he was to later become king), leaving Geoffrey behind as count of Anjou.

When his father in law, King Henry I of England, died in 1135, Geoffrey supported Matilda in entering Normandy to claim her inheritance. The border districts submitted to her, but in England her first cousin Stephen of Blois had been crowned king, supported by a number of barons after claims that Henry I had changed his mind on his deathbed in regard to his heir. Barons in Normandy soon followed suit, or were in a large majority the same barons as in England. There were a number that supported Matilda, her claim to the throne, and the two vows that they had taken at the request of Henry, for her to be his heir. The following year, Geoffrey gave Ambrieres, Gorron, and Chatilon-sur-Colmont to Juhel de Mayenne, on condition that he help obtain the inheritance of Geoffrey's wife.

In 1139, Matilda landed in England with 140 knights, where she was besieged at Arundel Castle by King Stephen. In the Anarchy which ensued, Stephen was captured at Lincoln in February 1141, and imprisoned at Bristol. A legatine council of the English church held at Winchester in April 1141 declared Stephen deposed and proclaimed Matilda "Lady of the English".

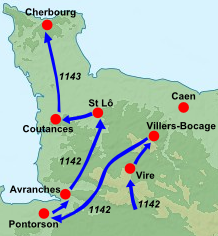
Geoffrey of Anjou's invasion of Normandy, 1142–43

During 1142 and 1143, Geoffrey secured all of Normandy west and south of the Seine, and, on 14 January 1144, he crossed the Seine and entered Rouen. He assumed the title of Duke of Normandy in the summer of 1144. In 1144, he founded an Augustine priory at Château-l'Hermitage in Anjou. Geoffrey held the duchy until 1149, when he and Matilda conjointly ceded it to their son, Henry, which cession was formally ratified by King Louis VII of France the following year.

Geoffrey also put down three baronial rebellions in Anjou, in 1129, 1135 and 1145–1151. He was often at odds with his younger brother, Elias, whom he had imprisoned (until Elias died in 1151). The threat of rebellion slowed his progress in Normandy, and is one reason he could never assist in England. Geoffrey died later the same year, aged 38, and Henry took his father's place as head of the ducal house. In 1153, the Treaty of Wallingford stipulated that Stephen should remain King of England for life and that Henry, the son of Geoffrey and Matilda should succeed him, beginning the Plantagenet era in English history.

== Death ==
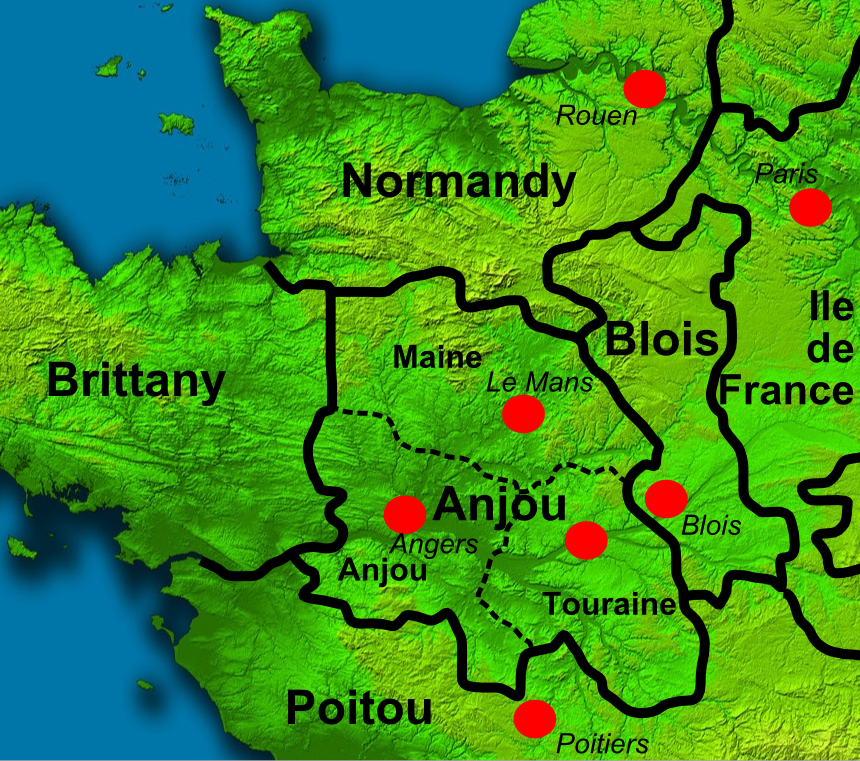
North West France 1150

Geoffrey died suddenly on 7 September 1151. According to John of Marmoutier, Geoffrey was returning from a royal council when he was stricken with fever. He arrived at Château-du-Loir, collapsed on a couch, made bequests of gifts and charities, and died. His wife and sons outlived him. He was buried at St Julien's Cathedral in Le Mans, France, and his son Henry succeeded him to by then a substantial part of France.

== Children ==
Geoffrey and Matilda's children were:

1. Henry II, King of England (1133–1189)
2. Geoffrey, Count of Nantes (1134–1158)
3. William, Viscount of Dieppe (1136–1164)

Geoffrey also had illegitimate children by an unknown mistress (or mistresses):

1. Hamelin, who married Isabel de Warenne, 4th Countess of Surrey
2. Emma, who married Dafydd Ab Owain Gwynedd, Prince of North Wales
3. Mary, who became a nun and Abbess of Shaftesbury and who may have been the poet Marie de France.

== Early heraldry ==
The arms of Geoffery Plantagenet

An enamel effigy (funerary plaque) commissioned by his widow to decorate the tomb of Geoffrey of Anjou is one of the earliest examples of European heraldry. Jean de Marmentier, a late-12th-century chronicler, reported that in 1128 Henry I of England knighted his son-in-law Geoffrey and granted him a badge of gold lions. A gold lion may already have been Henry's own badge, and different lion motifs would later be used by many of his descendants. The enamel shows Geoffrey with a blue shield depicting gold lions, apparently the same motif later used by a grandson of Geoffrey, William Longespee. In addition to being one of the first authentic representations of a coat of arms, according to British historian Jim Bradbury it "suggests possible evidence for the early use of what became the English royal arms".

Geoffrey Plantagenet House of Plantagenet Born: 24 August 1113 Died: 7 September 1151
Preceded by Ermengarde	Count of Maine; 1126–1151	Succeeded by Henry Curtmantle
Preceded by Fulk V	Count of Anjou; 1129–1151	Succeeded by Henry Curtmantle
Preceded by Eustace	Count of Mortain; 1141–1151	Succeeded by Henry Curtmantle
Preceded by Stephen	Duke of Normandy; 1144–1150	Succeeded by Henry Curtmantle
