= Eulalia (abbess of Shaftesbury) =

10th century Anglo-Saxon nun

Eulalia (died c.1106?) was a French nun who became abbess of the monastery at Shaftesbury (Dorset, England) in 1074. She is mentioned in a few contemporary documents including a charter in 1089 and a charter of King Stephen. She is also mentioned in the 1122-23 obituary rolls of Vitalis, abbot of Savigny and in the 1113 roll of Matilda, abbess of Caen.

The eastern arm of the monastery at Shaftesbury was completed in the late 11th century, and most likely under Eulalia's direction.

A contemporary manuscript from Shaftesbury containing a list of miracles of the Virgin Mary includes a story about a nun named Eulalia who is told by the Virgin to say her 'Ave Maria' more slowly. This Eulalia may be the same as the abbess Eulalia, but it is not known for certain.

The abbey owned a fair quantity of land, which was leased to tenants to provide income to the monastery. During the period of Eulalia's rule of the monastery, the abbey was also obligated to provide men for military service.

A charter from King Henry I indicates that there was a certain Thomas who was a free tenant of abbey lands in the 12th century who was also a kinsman of abbess Eulalia.

She may have died in 1106 and it is not certain to historians who succeeded her.
