= Vikings in Brittany =

Viking occupation of Brittany (c. 800s–1000s)

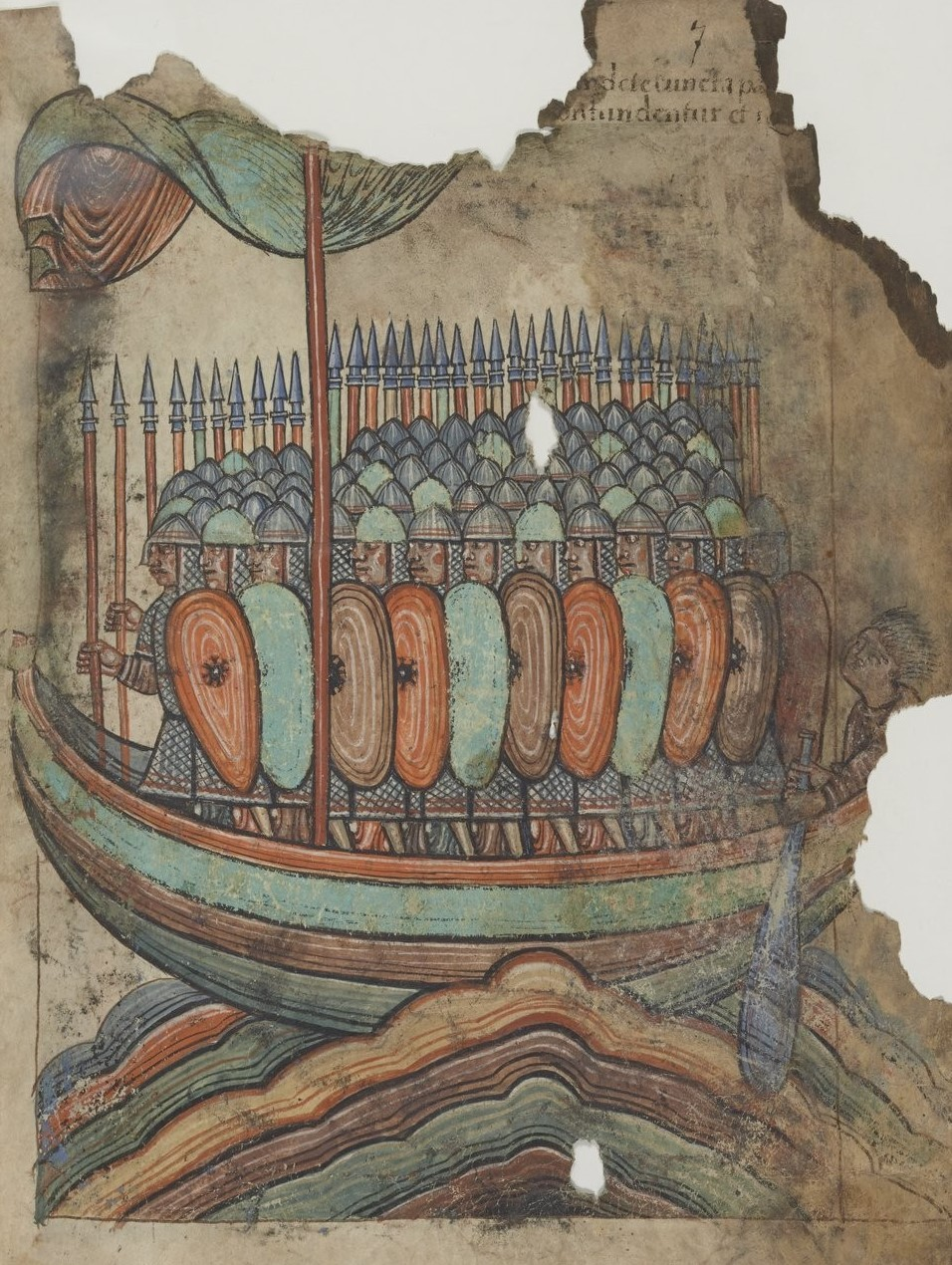
Depiction of Vikings sailing a longship from c. 1100

Vikings were active in Brittany during the Middle Ages, even occupying a portion of it for a time. Throughout the 9th century, the Bretons faced threats from various flanks: they resisted full incorporation into the Frankish Carolingian Empire yet they also had to repel an emerging threat of the new duchy of Normandy on their eastern border by these Scandinavian colonists.

The Bretons therefore walked a tightrope between these two powers, often using one to mitigate the other's expansionist agendas. This would eventually lead to the downfall of the short-lived Kingdom of Brittany and a two-decade long occupation by the Norse only for this to be finally broken with support arriving from surprising sources.

== Opportunistic raids ==
In the early 840's, the Norse generally were involved in small coastal and river raids throughout the region. They would be based each summer on the island of Noirmoutier at the mouth of the river Loire.

== Norse-Breton alliance ==
The following events give an indication that the Bretons initially allied themselves with these strangers in attacks on the Franks:

In May 843, Breton leader Nominoe took advantage of the confusion in the Frankish Carolingian Empire to consolidate his territory. In alliance with a rebel Frank, Lambert II of Nantes and the Norse warlord Hastein, Nominoe's son Erispoe defeated the Franks at the Battle of Messac, killing Count Renaud of Nantes.

In June 843 the Norse attacked and sacked the Frankish-controlled city of Nantes as it was bereft of defenders due to the Battle of Messac. They sailed up the Loire river with a fleet of 67 ships. Crowds had gathered to celebrate the feast of St. John. Most historians think that the raid was led by a Norse leader called Asgeir who was known for raiding up the River Seine. It is also quite possible that among the Norse leaders at Nantes was Hastein.

The Breton army under Nominoe in 845 defeated the forces of Charles the Bald, King of West Francia, at the Battle of Ballon, in the eastern part of Brittany near Redon and the Frankish border. Nominoe gained control over Rennes and Nantes, which had previously formed part of a Frankish border zone known as the Breton March.

The Frankish army was again defeated in 851 at the Battle of Jengland by the Bretons under Erispoe and control over Rennes, Nantes and the Pays de Retz was secured. Consequently, the Franks recognised the independence of Brittany and determined borders between the two states.

Under Salomon, King of Brittany, Hastein's Norse in 865 united with the Bretons again to defeat a Frankish army at the Battle of Brissarthe, near modern-day Le Mans. Two Frankish leaders, Robert the Strong and Ranulf I of Aquitaine, were killed. The Franks were forced to confirm Brittany's independence from the Franks and an expanded Breton territory. The Norse tactically helped their Breton allies by making devastating pillaging raids on the Frankish kingdom.

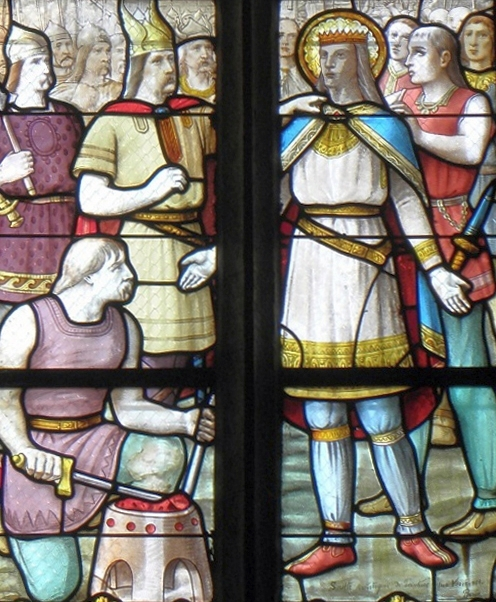
Church of Saint Pierre in Finistere window detailing King Salomon of Brittany with Vikings

In 867 Hastein's forces ravaged Bourges and a year later attacked Orléans. Peace lasted until the spring of 872 when the Norse fleet sailed up the Maine and occupied Angers, which led to a siege by Charles the Bald. A peace was agreed in October 873.

== Norse occupation ==
Hastein remained in the Loire country and was finally expelled by the Franks in 882 and relocated his forces north to the Seine. From this point the Norse seem to also become occupiers of land. By 907 Hastein appears to have been the leader of an area now called Upper Brittany, with Nantes as its capital.

Between 914 and 919 the Frankish King Robert of Neustria continued to fight the invading Norse. The Norse Rognvaldr killed the Breton Gourmaelon in battle and under this pressure, the Breton nobility fled to Mercia in Britain and Francia. The Chronicle of Nantes condemns the aristocrats abandonment of Brittany:

"The evil race of Normans, a most cruel and perverse people, sailed across the ocean with a huge fleet of ships and laid waste to all of Brittany. Frightened counts and viscounts and machiterns fled in panic before them, scattering to Francia, Burgundy and Aquitaine. Only poor Bretons tilling the soil stayed under the domination of the barbarians, without leaders or defenders."

In 919 the Franks ceded Nantes to Rognvaldr, who renamed it Namsborg, made peace and agreed to convert to Christianity for being allowed to keep Upper Brittany. Rognvaldr ravaged the lands between the Seine and Loire rivers in 924, then Burgundy, but was finally defeated at Chalmont. The Franks launched another failed attempt in 927 to retake Nantes.

According to local legends, a Viking band arrived in Guerande in 919 determined to pillage the city. The Guerandais apparently took refuge in the collegiate church praying to St Aubin who apparently sent a sign giving courage to the locals who took up arms and drove out the invaders.

Rognvaldr reigned until his death in 930. Hakon Rognvaldsson, known to the Franks as Incon, replaced him as Norse leader. King Rudolph of the Franks defeated Incon at Estress in the same year. This was however not deemed conclusive.

== Breton revolt ==
In 931 the Norse assembled an army on the Loire to attack the Franks. Breton peasants seized this opportunity and rebelled. The Norse appear to have been taken by surprise, a counterattack however ensured that Brittany is reconquered.

By 935 Incon was isolated after William Longsword of Normandy reconciled with the Franks and exiled Bretons started returning from Britain. Alan Barbetorte returned to Brittany from England between 936 and 938, and engaged the Norse. Incon was slain and Nantes recaptured in 937. With support from the Anglo-Saxon King Athelstan, the Bretons rebellion spread throughout the peninsula.

The Battle of Trans-la-Fôret was fought on 1 August 939 between the occupying Norse and the Bretons, led by a joint army of Alan II of Brittany, Judicael Berengar of Brittany and the Frank Hugh II, Count of Maine, who decisively attacked and defeated the Norse stronghold, bringing an end to the occupation.

== Outcome ==
The Breton victory at Trans-la-Forêt freed Brittany from Norse occupation and led to the re-establishment of the Breton State not as a Kingdom, but as a sovereign duchy under Alan II, due to a new fealty owed to the Franks for helping remove the Norse. Brittany became fortified by returning Breton lords.

Norse piracy affected the vibrant maritime trade between the Bretons and their Welsh cousins, isolating the Bretons. Armorican texts protected by monks for centuries were lost after this period. The Breton capital was moved from Nantes to Rennes, which was considered more defensible. This would become a future point of discord between the two cities.

A Norse saga attributed to Snorri Sturluson mentions that sporadic attacks continued into 1015 when the Breton town of Guerande was destroyed.

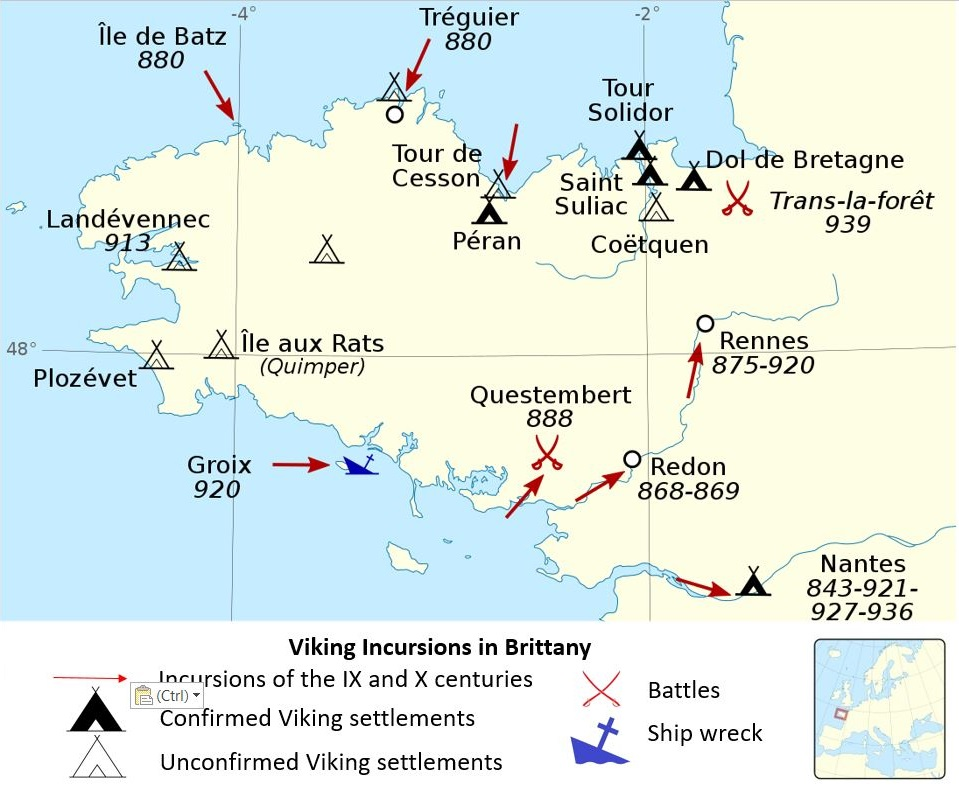
Viking Incursions and Battles in Brittany

== See also ==
- History of Brittany
- Breton literature
- List of Breton historians
- Incon of Nantes
- Ragenold of Nantes
