= History of Brittany =

Coordinates: 48°00′N 3°00′W

Brittany Bretagne (French) Breizh (Breton) Bertaèyn (Gallo)
- Historical province
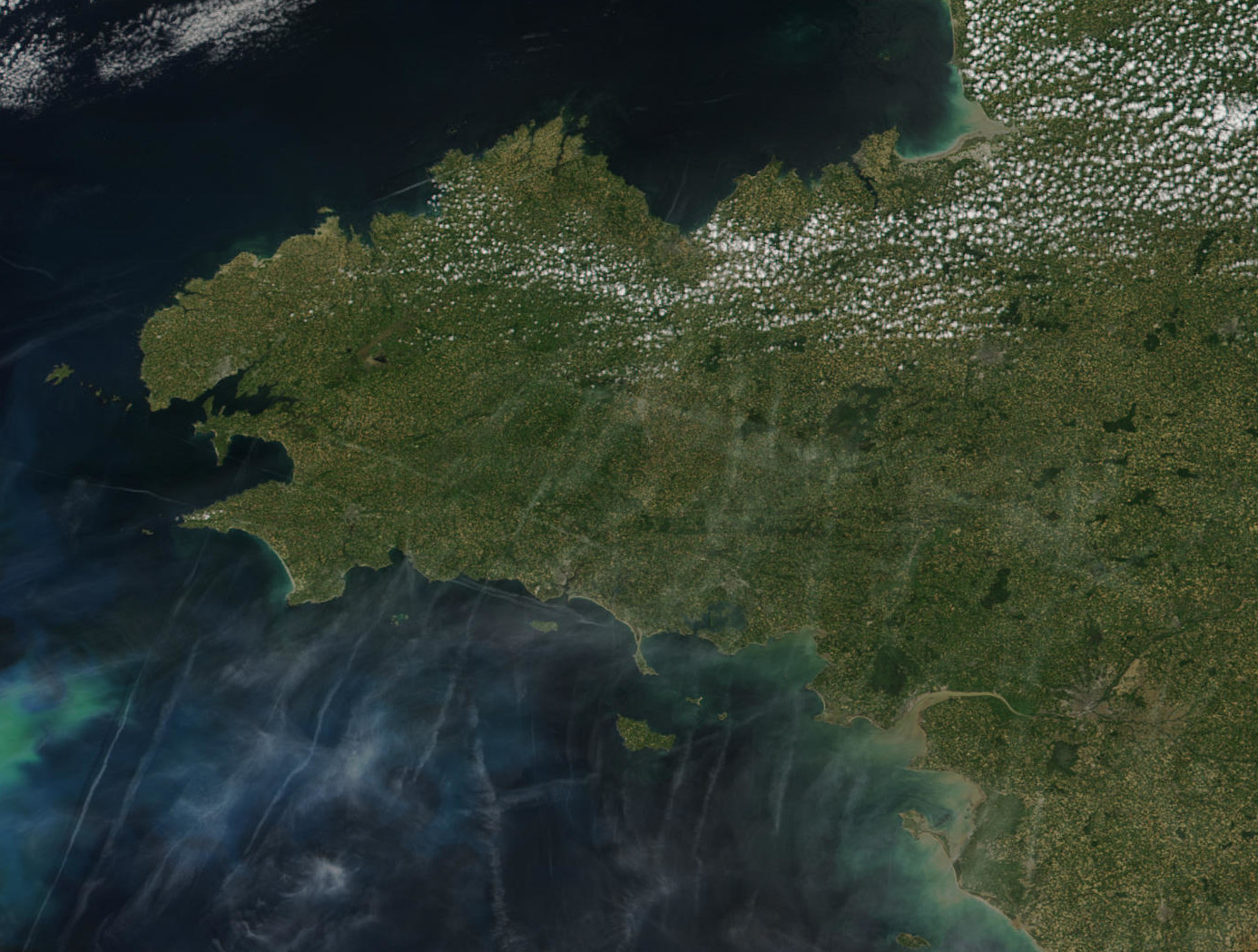

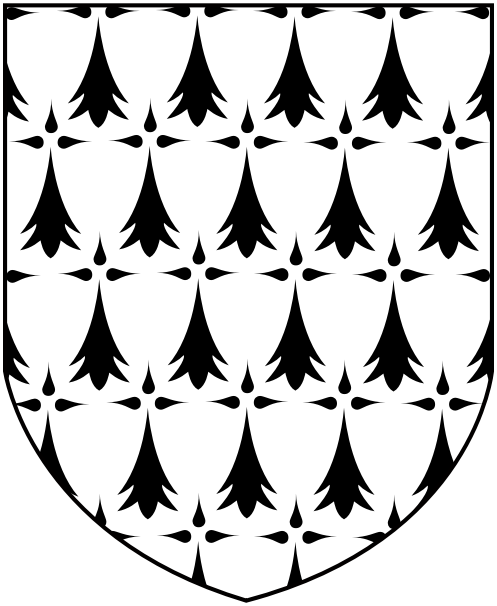
- Flag Coat of arms
- Motto(s): None (de jure); Historical: Kentoc'h mervel eget bezañ saotret Rather death than dishonour (de facto)
- Anthem: None (de jure) "Bro Gozh ma Zadoù"; Old Land of Our Fathers (de facto)
- Country: France
- Largest settlements: List: Nantes; Rennes; Brest; Saint-Nazaire; Quimper; Lorient; Vannes; Saint-Malo; Saint-Brieuc; Douarnenez

Area
  - Total: 34,023 km^{2} (13,136 sq mi)

Population (2021)
  - Total: 4,829,968
- Demonym: Bretons
- Time zone: UTC+1 (CET)
  - Summer (DST): UTC+2 (CEST)
- ISO 3166 code: FR-E
- Website: bretagne.com

The history of Brittany may refer to the entire history of the Armorican peninsula or only to the creation and development of a specifically Brythonic culture and state in the Early Middle Ages and the subsequent history of that state.

Pre-Brythonic Armorica includes the ancient megalith cultures in the area and the Celtic tribal territories that existed before Roman rule. After the collapse of the Roman Empire, large scale migration from the British Isles led to the foundation of British colonies linked initially to homelands in Cornwall, Devon, and Wales. The various independent petty Breton states later developed into a Kingdom and then a Duchy of Brittany, before it was unified with France to become a province. After the French Revolution Brittany was abolished as an administrative unit, but continued to retain its distinctive cultural identity. Its administrative existence was reconstituted, in reduced size, as the Region of Brittany in the mid-20th century.

The history of Brittany begins with settlement beginning in prehistoric times. The Neolithic era, which began around 5000 BCE, is characterised in the region by the development of an important megalithic art found in sites such as the cairn of Barnenez, the cairn of Gavrinis, the table of the Merchants of Locmariaquer or the alignments of Carnac. In the course of its protohistory which began around the middle of the third century BCE, a subsoil rich in tin allowed the development of an industry in bronze objects, which led to commercial routes for export to other regions of Europe. It was inhabited by Gallic peoples including the Veneti and the Namnetes in the first centuries BCE before these territories were conquered by Julius Caesar in 57 BCE, and progressively Romanized.

As part of Armorica since the Gallo-Roman period, Brittany developed an important maritime trade network near the ports of Nantes, Vannes, and Alet, as well as salting factories along its coasts. When Rome encountered crises in the third and fifth centuries, the first wave of island Bretons were asked by the imperial power to help secure their territory, beginning with a migratory movement that was carried out until the sixth century, and saw the beginnings of many kingdoms in the peninsula.

In order to prevent Breton incursion, the neighbouring Frankish kingdom created a Breton borderland incorporating the counties of Rennes and Nantes. From the sixth to ninth centuries however, the Merovingian dynasty and the Carolingian dynasty tried to integrate the region into the Frankish kingdom, with limited and ephemeral success.

The union of the country as Brittany occurred in 851 under King Erispoë, son of Nominoë, but was disrupted by disputes over succession and Norsemen incursions. Since 939, Brittany was re-established as a Sovereign Duchy with somewhat definite borders, administered by Dukes of Breton houses from 939 to 1166, before falling into the sphere of influence of the Plantagenets and then the Capets. The War of the Breton Succession lasted from 1341 to 1364 against the backdrop of the Hundred Years' War. An autonomous power emerged in the fourteenth and fifteenth centuries, maintaining a policy of independence from France. The union of Brittany to France occurred in 1532.

The Breton province then maintained relative autonomy and benefited from its own institutions. After a period of strong economic and demographic growth in the sixteenth and seventeenth centuries, due to a period of newfound peace, Brittany experienced a troubled period from the end of the seventeenth century to the French Revolution of 1789. Brittany was dissolved in 1789 and divided among the departments of Côtes-du-Nord, Finistère, Ille-et-Vilaine, Loire-Inférieure and Morbihan.

After a long nineteenth century marked by a modernization of agriculture and by huge increases in population, an emigration to the rest of France began. Although a traditionally conservative region, Brittany saw the rise of workers' movements in cities such as Brest, Lorient and Saint-Nazaire.

The First World War was an important turning point for Bretons, who discovered new ways of life, which some would seek to integrate little by little. The question of the proper place for the Breton language and regional traditions became the central element of a political movement which began to emerge in the same era. A long process of modernization took place from the 1920s through the 1970s, in concert with a movement of cultural reaffirmation.

== Prehistory of Brittany ==
=== Stone Age ===
==== Paleolithic ====
The Paleolithic period of Brittany ranges from 700 000 to 10 000 years BC. Traces of the oldest industries were found in the middle valley of the Vilaine river, identified as pebbles arranged in a quarry in Saint-Malo-de-Phily. The oldest traces of habitat are located in Saint-Colomban, in Carnac, and take the form of settlements built in natural shelters (cliffs created by the erosion along the coasts). In addition to pebbles, bifaces are found there, and the site dates to 300,000 BC. J.-C. Acheulian bifacials from this period are found along the sea coast, as Treguennec, Hôpital-Camfrout or Pléneuf. The oldest traces of fire use (in the region but also of occidental Europe) are found on the site of Menez Dregan with a date making them up to 400 000 years BC. The few human groups are then made of hunter-gatherers.

From the Middle-Mousterian period, remain two outstanding sites in the region, in Mont-Dol where scrapers were found in a site dated to 70,000 BC., as well as at Goaréva on the island of Bréhat.

The Upper Paleolithic is characterized by refined tools like blades and lamellae found on the site of Beg-ar-C'Hastel in Kerlouan, or at Plasenn-al-Lomm on the island of Bréhat. No painted cave is identified in the area, probably because of rising sea levels during the next period. But the nearest cave of this type is known in Saulges. The end of the Palaeolithic period in the region is around 10,000 BC. J.-C.

==== Mesolithic ====
The Mesolithic period covers in the region a period from 10,000 BC. to 5000 BC., corresponding to the end of the last Ice Age and the resulting rise in water level. Steppe vegetation is replaced by a vegetation of birch and pine, and hazel, oak and elms; large mammals give way to animals of smaller size as deer or wild boar. For a time, hunting and gathering continue, as well as fishing and foraging. By the time of the Neolithic, however, animal domestication and cereal production replace hunting. The population is mainly coastal and larger on the south coast. The skeletons found from this period attest to an average size of 1.59 meters for men and 1.52 m for women.

Human technology continues to progress with a reduction in size of stone tools to form microliths. Human societies are more structured, with a degree of specialization of activities in a given community (as indicated by studies of the Téviec burial site) and the beginning of an artistic expression. Traces of deaths caused by tools like arrows are also visible on some skeletons, attesting to sometimes violent conflicts between different communities.

==== Neolithic ====
The Neolithic period (stretching from 5000 BC to 2000 BC.) saw the arrival of an agriculture based on slash-and-burn: land is reclaimed from the forest after having fired and is then used for breeding before sprinkling grass. This evolution was made possible by the development of methods of extracting stones and their shaping. In a quarry in Plussulien, about 5000 dolerite axes were extracted per year, representing 40% of the axes of the Breton peninsula. The dissemination of these tools stretched to Paris basin, and 10 copies of these axes were found to Belgium and southern England. The region also imported yellow blond flint blades from Touraine.

This period is also notable for the development of megalithic monuments, helped by a significant economic growth. Two of the most ancient sites, the mound of Barnenez and the Petit-Mont, whose buildings date back to 5000 BC., evidenced by their similarities to a unity of culture in the peninsula. This type of construction will eventually evolve and provide more regional variants. In these burial sites were found engravings similar to those observed in Irish sites like Newgrange.

Besides these barrows are also present menhirs, the highest known being in the Leon region where the largest, that of Kerloas, rises to 9.50 m. The largest ever erected is located in South Brittany in Locmariaquer: the Locmariaquer megaliths amounting to 18.5 m. Engravings can also be found there and their functions are multiple: Indicator of burials, astronomical and topographic features, or reflecting a water worship. The last menhirs were raised around 1800-1500 BC. They can be combined in single or multiple rows, or in semicircles or circles.

=== Protohistory ===
==== Iron Age ====
A variety of tribes are mentioned in Roman sources, like the Veneti, Armoricani, Osismii, Namnetes and Coriosolites. Strabo and Poseidonius describe the Armoricani as belonging to the Belgae.

Armorican gold coins have been widely exported and are even found in the Rhineland.

Salterns are widespread in Northern Armorica, for example at Trégor, Ebihens and Enez Vihan near Pleumeur-Bodou (Côtes-d'Armor) and the island of Yoc'h near Landuvez (Finistère) of late La Tène date.

An estimated 40–55 kg of salt per oven were produced at Ebihens. Each oven was about 2 m long. The site dates to the end of the early La Tène or the middle La Tène period. Numerous briquetage remains have been found. At Tregor, boudins de Calage (hand-bricks) were the typical form of briquetage, between 2.5 and 15 cm long and with a diameter of 4–7 cm. At the salterns at Landrellec and Enez Vihan at Pleumeur-Bodou the remains of rectangular ovens have been excavated that are 2.5–3 m long and about 1 m wide, constructed of stones and clay. On the Gulf of Morbihan about 50 salterns have been found so far, mainly dating to the final La Tène period.

== Roman rule ==
In 56 BC the area was conquered by the Romans under Julius Caesar. The main resistance came from the Veneti. After their defeat their leaders were killed and the tribe sold as slaves. The Romans called the district Armorica (a Latinisation of a Celtic word meaning "coastal region"), part of the Gallia Lugdunensis province. The modern département of Côtes-d'Armor has taken up the ancient name. After the reforms of Diocletian, it was part of the diocesis Galliarum.

The uprising of the Bagaudae in the 3rd century led to unrest and depopulation, numerous villages were destroyed. Thick layers of black earth in the towns point to urban depopulation as well. The rule of Constantine (307–350) led to a certain renaissance. Numerous coins were minted. At the tractus Armoricanus, new forts were built, for example at Brest, Avranches and Le Yaudet. The Notitia Dignitatum (circa 400 AD) mentions a number of local units manning the Tractus armoricanus et nervicanus, for example Mauritanian troops in the territory of the Veneti and Osismii. Frankish laeti were present in Rennes. Christianisation is commonly dated to the late fourth century, but material evidence is rare.

== Middle Ages ==
=== Early Middle Ages ===
==== Arrival of the Bretons ====
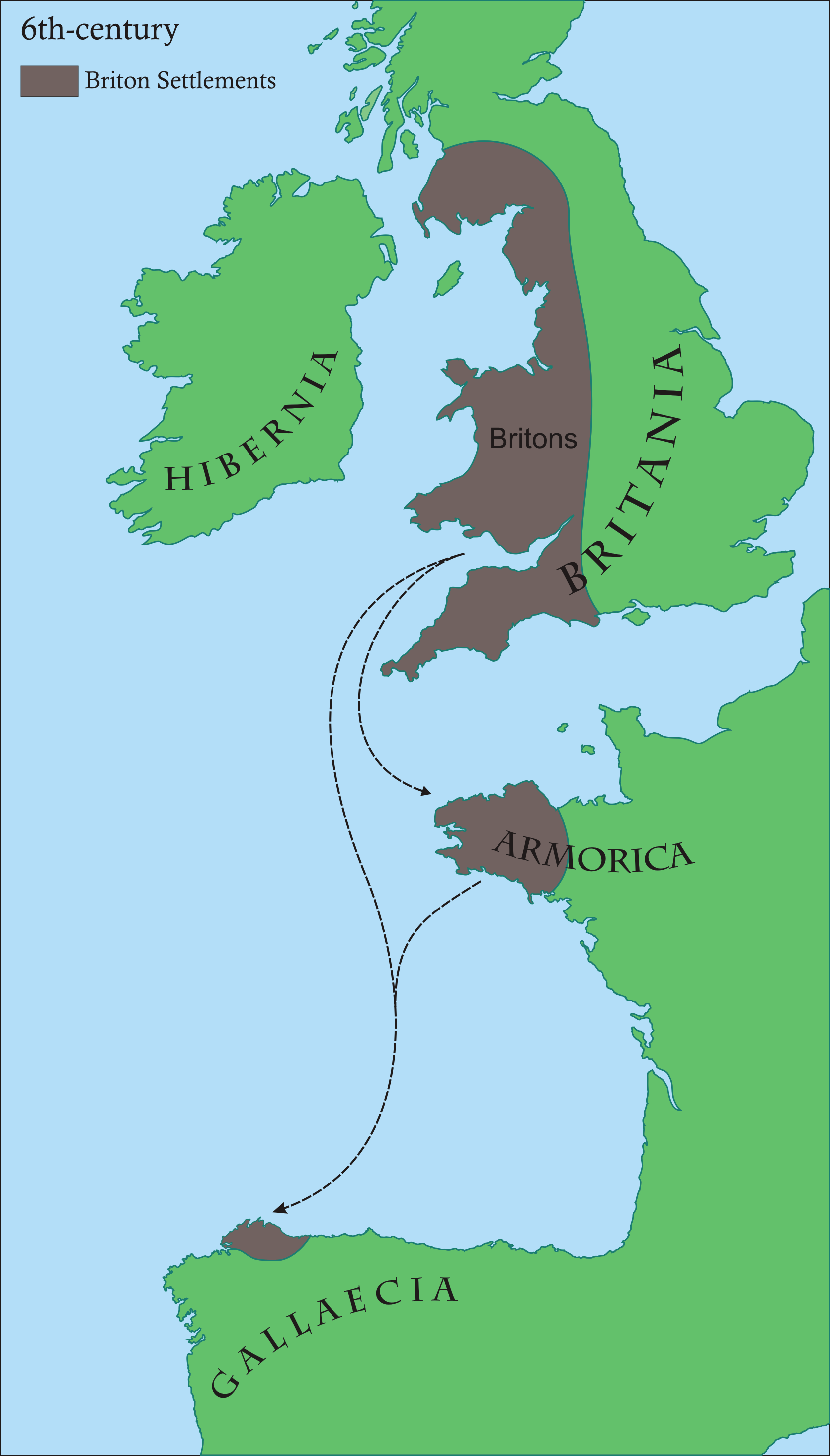
Map of British settlements in the 6th century.

In the 380s, a large number of Britons in the Roman army may have been stationed in Armorica. The 9th century Historia Brittonum states that the emperor Magnus Maximus, who withdrew Roman forces from Britania, settled the troops there. Other British and Welsh authors (Nennius and Gildas) mention a second wave of South-Western Britons from Dumnonia, settling in Armorica in the following century to escape the invading Anglo-Saxons and Irish. Modern archaeology supports a two-wave migration.

These Britons gave the region its current name and contributed the Breton language, Brezhoneg, a sister language to Welsh and Cornish. (Brittany used to be known in English as Little Britain to distinguish it from Great Britain.)

Conan Meriadoc, the mythic founder of the house of Rohan, is mentioned by medieval Welsh sources as having led the settlement of Brittany by mercenaries serving Maximus. The Welsh text The Dream of Maxen, which contains semi-factual information about the usurpation of Maximus, states that they married native women after cutting out their tongues to preserve the purity of their language. This can be interpreted as a legend formulated in order to explain the Welsh (Brythonic) name for Brittany, Llydaw, as originating from lled-taw or "half-silent". In fact, the term "Llydaw" or "Ledav" in early Breton probably derives from the Celtic name Litavis.

There are numerous records of missionaries migrating from Britania during the second wave, especially the seven founder-saints of Brittany and Saint Gildas. Many Breton towns are named for these early saints. The Irish saint Colombanus also evangelised Brittany, commemorated at Saint-Columban in Carnac.

The earliest text known in the Breton language, a botanical treatise, dates from 590 (for comparison, the earliest text in French dates from 843). Most of the early Breton language medieval manuscripts were lost during the Viking invasions.

==== The petty kingdoms ====
In the Early Middle Ages, Brittany was divided into three kingdoms – Domnonia (Devnent), Cornouaille (Kernev), and Bro Waroc'h (Broërec) – which eventually were incorporated into the larger Breton state. The first two kingdoms derive their names from the homelands of the migrating Britons (Devon and Cornwall). Bro Waroc'h ("land of Waroch") derives from the name of one of the first known Breton rulers, who dominated the region of Vannes (Gwened). The rulers of Domnonia such as Conomor sought to expand their territory (including holdings in British Devon and Cornwall), claiming overlordship over all Bretons, though there was constant tension between local lords.

=== Resistance to outside rule ===
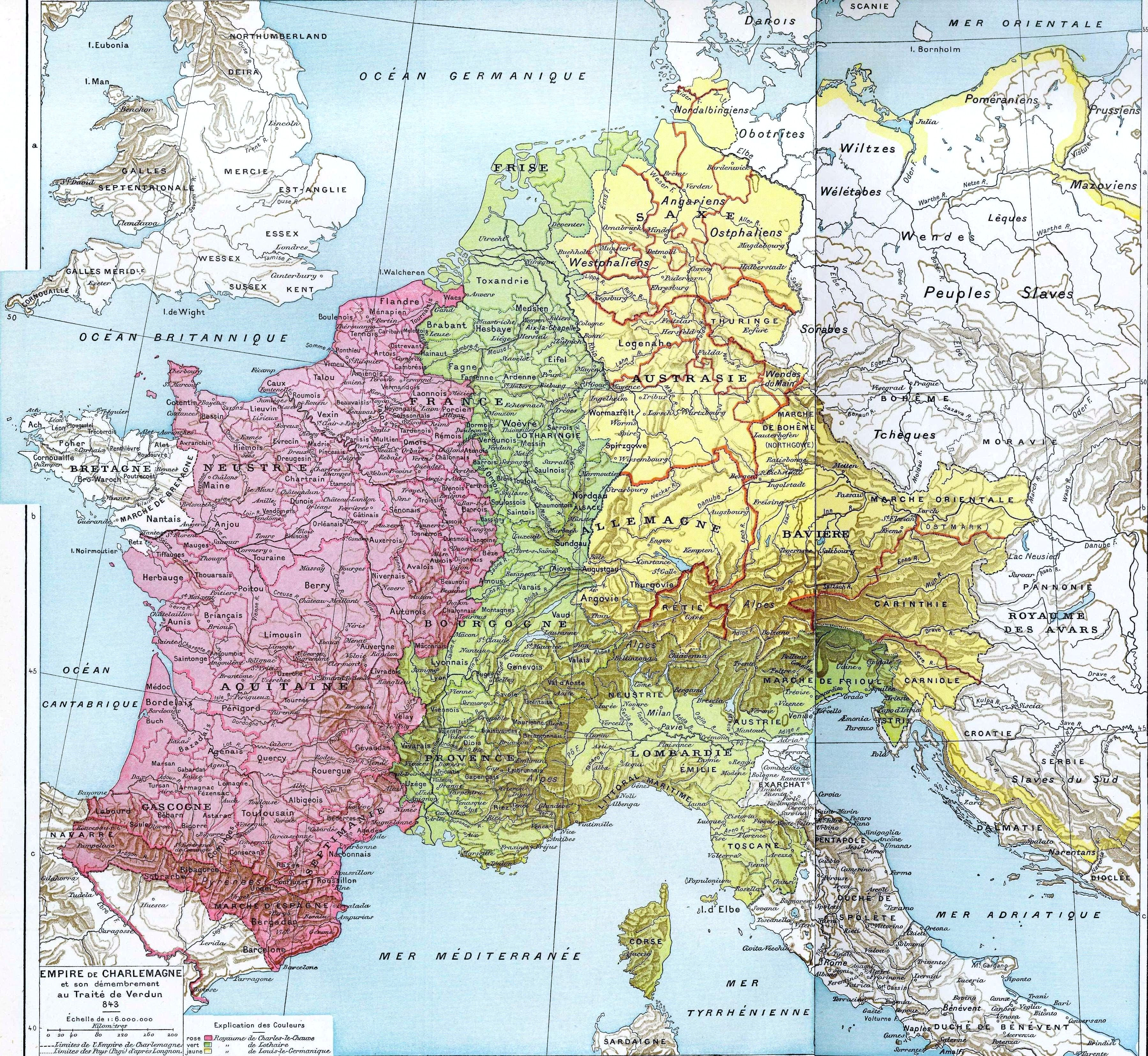
Partition of the Carolingian Empire in 843

During the 9th century the Bretons resisted incorporation into the Frankish Carolingian Empire. The first unified Duchy of Brittany was founded by Nominoe. The Bretons made friendly overtures to the Danish Vikings to help contain Frankish expansionist ideas.

When the Carolingian empire was divided in 843, Nominoe took advantage of the confusion to consolidate his territory. In alliance with Lambert II of Nantes and the Viking warlord Hastein, Nominoe's son Erispoe defeated the Franks at the Battle of Messac. In 845 the Breton army under Nominoe defeated the forces of Charles the Bald, King of West Francia (France), at the Battle of Ballon, in the eastern part of Brittany near Redon and the Frankish border. Nominoe gained control over the major towns of Rennes and Nantes, which had previously formed part of the Frankish border zone known as the "Breton March".

Control over Rennes, Nantes and the Pays de Retz was secured when the Frankish army was defeated once again in 851 at the Battle of Jengland by the Bretons under Erispoe; consequently Charles the Bald recognised the independence of Brittany and determined the borders that defined the historic duchy and later province. Under Erispoe's successor Salomon, Hastein's Vikings and the Bretons united as one in 866 to defeat a Frankish army at the Battle of Brissarthe, near modern-day Le Mans. Two Frankish leaders, Robert the Strong and Ranulf, were killed by the Vikings. The Franks were forced to confirm Brittany's independence from the Frankish kingdoms and expand Salomon's territory. The Vikings tactically helped their Breton allies by making devastating pillaging raids on the Frankish kingdoms. This unfortunately became a double edged sword over the next few decades as the Vikings turned on the Bretons and pillaged Brittany, eventually occupying it. This situation was only overturned with the return of exiled Bretons and an alliance with the Franks. From this point Brittany became a duchy with various levels of fealty to West Francia and eventually France.

=== High Middle Ages ===
Bretons took part in the Revolt of 1173–1174, siding with the rebels against Henry II of England. Henry's son Geoffroy II, then heir apparent to the Duchy of Brittany, resisted his father's attempts to annex Brittany to the possessions of the English Crown. Geoffroy's son Arthur did likewise during his reign (1186–1203) until his death, perhaps by assassination under King John's orders.

In 1185, Geoffroy II signed "Count Geoffrey's Assise" which forbade the subdivision of fiefs, thereby reinforcing the Breton feudal system.

After the presumed death of Duke Arthur I, with Arthur's full elder sister Eleanor captive under John of England, the Bretons supported Arthur's half younger sister Alix instead. King Philip August of France married Alix to the Capetian prince Peter Mauclerc of Dreux, establishing Peter as regent of Alix.

In 1213, with the aim of strengthening his power in Brittany, Philip August introduced Peter as administrator of the duchy and tutor of his son, duke Jehan of Brittany. It was Peter Mauclerc who introduced the use of ermines in the Breton coat of arms and came to espouse the cause of his fief's independence with respect to France. While John attempted to regain Brittany in the name of Eleanor, he was defeated in 1214 and finally recognized Alix and Peter. Eleanor ended up in English prison without issue, with her claim never raised ever since.

The 14th and 15th centuries saw the recognition of the distinction between a Gallo-speaking Britannia gallicana (now called Upper Brittany) and a Breton-speaking Britannia britonizans (now Lower Brittany).

The Breton War of Succession was fought in 1341–1364. The parties were the half-brother of the last duke, John of Montfort (supported by the English), and his niece, Joanna of Penthièvre, who was married to Charles of Blois, nephew of the king of France. This protracted conflict, a component of the Hundred Years' War, has passed into legend (see for example Combat of the Thirty and Bertrand de Guesclin). Its outcome was decided at the Battle of Auray in 1364, where the House of Montfort was victorious over the French party. After the first Treaty of Guérande, Joanna of Penthièvre abdicated her claims to the dukedom in favour of John the Conqueror. A modified form of Salic law was introduced in Brittany as a result.

In the midst of the conflict, in 1352, the États de Bretagne or Estates of Brittany were established. They would develop into the Duchy's parlement.

The tomb of Francis II in Nantes

Deserted by his nobles, Duke John IV left for exile in England in 1373. The higher nobility of that time, like the house of Coetmen-Penthièvre, or the house of Rougé, descendants of the former kings of Brittany, strongly supported the Penthièvre side and was nearly extinguished in the repeated fights between Montfort and Penthièvre's troops. The king of France, Charles V, named as lieutenant-general of Brittany his brother, the duke of Anjou (also a son-in-law of Joanna de Penthièvre). In 1378, the king of France sought to annex Brittany, which provoked the Bretons to recall John IV from exile. The second Treaty of Guérande (1381) established Brittany's neutrality in the Anglo-French conflict, although John continued to swear homage to Charles VI.

In 1420, duke John V was kidnapped by the count of Penthièvre, grandson of Joanna of Penthièvre. John's wife, duchess Joanna de France besieged the rebels and set free her husband, who confiscated the Penthièvre's goods.

In 1464 the Catholicon, a Breton-Latin-French dictionary by Jehan Lagadeuc, was published. This book was the world's first trilingual dictionary, the first Breton dictionary and also the first French dictionary.

The army of the Kingdom of France, with the help of 5,000 mercenaries from Switzerland and Italy, defeated the Breton army in 1488, and the last Duke of independent Brittany, Francis II, was forced to submit to a treaty giving the King of France the right to determine the marriage of the Duke's daughter, a 12-year-old girl, the heir to the Duchy. The Duchess Anne was the last independent ruler of the duchy as she was ultimately obliged to marry Louis XII of France. The duchy passed on her death to her daughter Claude, but Claude's husband Francis I of France incorporated the duchy into the Kingdom of France in 1532 through the Edict of Union between Brittany and France, which was registered with the Estates of Brittany.

== Modern era ==
=== Early modern period ===
After 1532, Brittany retained a certain fiscal and regulatory autonomy, which was defended by the Estates of Brittany despite the rising tide of royal absolutism. Brittany remained on the whole strongly Catholic during the period of the Huguenots and the Wars of Religion, although Protestantism made some headway in Nantes and a few other areas. From 1590 to 1598, during the War of the Catholic League, Philippe Emmanuel, Duke of Mercœur (governor of Brittany and husband of the countess of Penthièvre) sought to have himself proclaimed Duke of Brittany and allied with Philip II of Spain. The latter, on the other hand, considered establishing his daughter Isabella at the head of a reconstituted Brittany. Henry IV, however, brought Mercœur to an honourable surrender.

During the era of Colbert, Brittany benefited from France's naval expansion. Major ports were built or renovated at Saint-Malo, Brest, and Lorient, and Bretons came to constitute a leading component of the French navy. Bretons played an important role in the colonization of New France and the West Indies (see French colonisation of the Americas).

In 1675, insurgents in the diocese of Cornouaille and elsewhere rose up in the Revolt of the Bonnets Rouges. The rebels, in contact with Holland, were expecting assistance that never came. Sébastian Ar Balp, the leader of the rebellion, was assassinated by the Marquis de Montgaillard whom Ar Balp was holding prisoner. The rebellion was repressed by the duc de Chaulnes, and hundreds of Bretons were hanged or broken on the wheel. Madame de Sévigné claimed that French soldiers garrisoned in Rennes had roasted a Breton infant on a spit. A whole street in Rennes, suspected of seditiousness, was demolished leaving the inhabitants homeless.

In the conspiracy of Pontcallec of 1720, members of the petty nobility in contact with Spain led a tax revolt against the Régence. The marquis de Pontcallec and three others were tried and executed in Nantes for the uprising.

During the 18th century, Nantes rose to become one of the most important commercial centres of France. The backbone of Nantes's prosperity was the Atlantic slave trade.

On 4 August 1789, the National Constituent Assembly in Paris unanimously proclaimed the abolition of feudal privileges. These included the privileges of the provinces such as Brittany. Brittany thus lost the juridical existence, autonomy, Parlement, and administrative, fiscal and legal peculiarities guaranteed since the Edict of Union of 1532. Although the Breton Club (better known as the Jacobins) in Paris had initiated the move to abolish feudal distinctions, the decision proved increasingly unpopular in Brittany, where the loss of local autonomy and the increasingly anti-clerical character of the Revolution were resented. Many Bretons took part in the Chouannerie, the royalist insurgency assisted by Great Britain and allied with the revolt in the Vendée. Brittany thus became a hotbed of resistance to the French Revolution.

The territory of Brittany was divided in 1789 into five départements, partially on the basis of earlier divisions called présidiaux which in turn had issued from medieval bailliages.

=== Revolutionary period ===
Many Bretons, especially members of the merchant class, remained sympathetic to the monarchy during the French Revolution. In 1791, Bretons began to plan a re-establishment of the Estates General of the province, and a return to the estates of the realm system. Charles Armand Tuffin, marquis de la Rouërie was a significant figure in this plot but ultimately ended up in hiding after a secret agent divulged his participation to Georges Danton.

Despite the obstacle posed by one of the plot's major architects going into hiding, the insurrection continued on, aided by the Kingdom of Great Britain, as the British desired continued access to the ports on Brittany's coast. Brittany was especially open to British landings since the French Navy presence in the region was weakened by September 1793 due to previous mutinies and the restructuring of the navy. Brittany, with its weak infrastructure, was poorly connected to the rest of France. Normally, cities in Brittany were used for their naval importance, but they eventually became industrialized because of the Republic, which prepared them for war. The Committee of Public Safety was preparing to attack Britain as Britain had significant influence in the towns of Saint-Malo and Brest, and some revolutionaries feared that these towns would place themselves under British control as Toulon had done.

In light of these mounting foreign threats, the Committee of Public Safety sent Republican troops known as ‘Representatives on a Mission’ to local regions—such as Brittany—to ensure the preservation of national unity within France. The function of these Representatives, by order of the National Convention, was to replace the local government leaders. In doing so, the Representatives were meant to quell anti-revolutionary sentiment. The order of the National Convention on 14 August 1793 declared that these Representatives "take every measure of interior and exterior defense which they may consider necessary" contributed to the nationwide violence experienced during the Terror. Jean-Baptiste Carrier, one prominent Representative on a Mission, who had been sent to Brittany, dutifully reported to the Committee of Public Safety that he would "arrest those declared guilty of the counter-revolutionary disorders committed by this company". Pierre Louis Prieur, another such Representative on a Mission, was involved in extinguishing the uprisings in the coastal towns of Brittany such as Lorient and Vannes.

The peasants in Brittany were royalist and opposed the new government. Pierre Louis Prieur sought to implement the authority of the convention by arresting suspected counter-revolutionaries, removing the local authorities of Brittany, and making speeches. In Vannes, there was an unfavorable attitude towards the Revolution with only 200 of the city's population of 12,000 accepting the new constitution. Prieur declared Brittany's countryside overcome by fanaticism in order to justify terror as the new order. Prieur then infiltrated cities with troops and conducted house searches to locate and silence rebellious aristocrats and peasants. While arrests were the first defense of the newly established government against counter-revolutionaries, fear quickly mounted concerning the power of this group. Quickly, leaders such as Carrier had moved from ordering arrests to ordering executions of anyone found guilty of treason against the state.

=== Post-Revolutionary period ===
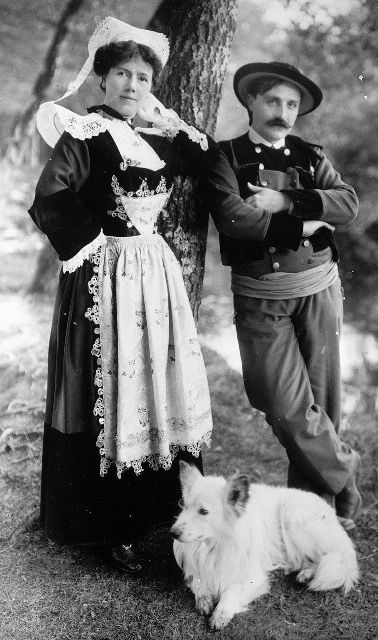
A Breton couple (Léna and Théodore Botrel) wearing traditional Breton costumes at the beginning of the 20th century

In the 19th-century Brittany acquired a reputation for timeless autarky, as Romantics developed an image of the province as a bastion of peasant traditionalism, religious festivals, and wild landscapes. At the same time, Breton life became increasingly integrated with that of the rest of France, particularly under the Third Republic.

However, the image of Brittany as anti-republican led French politicians to doubt the reliability of Breton soldiers during the military actions that followed the collapse of the Second French Empire, as resulted from the disastrous French defeat in the Battle of Sedan during the Franco-Prussian War. Fearing Breton separatist sentiments, the soldiers were interned in a military camp, Camp Conlie, outside Le Mans. Because of bad conditions, worsened by mud and rain, several hundreds died from disease. The camp has been described as a "concentration camp" and became a significant atrocity story within Breton nationalism. In 1871 the camp was closed and the French military decided to incorporate the remaining 19,000 Breton soldiers into the 2nd Army of the Loire. They participated in the Battle of Le Mans, but poorly equipped, they were crushed by the Prussians and also blamed for the defeat by the French commanders.

Brittany has had its own regionalist and separatist movements which have experienced varying success at elections and other political contests. Modern Breton nationalism developed at the end of the 19th and beginning of the 20th century. The main body of these movements situated themselves within the Catholic traditionalist current. After 1944, Breton nationalism was widely discredited thanks to the collaboration of a number of prominent nationalists (such as Roparz Hemon) with the Nazis, who occupied Brittany along with most of the rest of the French state during the Second World War. On the other hand, other Breton nationalists took part in the Resistance. Brittany played a particularly important role in the Resistance thanks to its proximity to Great Britain, the relatively rugged landscape, and the presence of important naval installations. However, during the Second World War the Allies bombed Brittany along with the rest of Northern France with such ferocity that many towns such as Lorient nearly ceased to exist. The act involved the killing of many thousands of French citizens. In the case of Lorient, the town was not freed until the end of the war and the submarine pens were not destroyed unlike the civilian areas which had been wiped out.

When France was divided into administrative regions by the Vichy government, the official Brittany Region included only four of the five departments traditionally understood to comprise the Breton territory. This removal of Loire-Atlantique, which contains Nantes (one of the two traditional Breton capitals) from the Breton region has been a matter of much controversy.

An experimental nuclear power station was constructed at Brennilis in the Monts d'Arrée during the 1960s. This was in operation for about ten years, and since 1988 it has been in the process of being dismantled. This is the first time that a nuclear power station has been dismantled in France.

Since the 1960s in particular Breton nationalism has developed a strong leftist character, alongside the Catholic traditionalist strain. Certain groups such as the FLB and the ARB, marginal even within nationalist circles, made headlines through sabotage against highly symbolic targets.

In March 1972, workers at the Joint Français, a factory in Saint-Brieuc, went on strike to obtain a wage increase. The strike lasted eight weeks.

Since the 1940s, use of the Breton language has declined precipitously. In most Breton-speaking communities, it has become uncommon for children born since 1945 to acquire much of the language as French becomes universalized. On the other hand, Breton has enjoyed increasing support among intellectuals and professionals since the 1970s, and the relatively small, urban-based Diwan movement has sought to stem the loss of young Breton speakers through bilingual immersion schools. Breton music has also become more widely known through the work of musicians such as Alan Stivell.

On 16 March 1978, the supertanker Amoco Cadiz ran aground a few hundred metres from the shores of the small port of Portsall in Ploudalmézeau. The result was the fifth-largest oil spill in world history which severely affected the north and northwest coasts of Brittany.

In February and March 1980, the population of Plogoff, the commune containing the Pointe du Raz, demonstrated to prevent the construction of a nuclear power generator in their commune, despite the paratroopers and helicopters sent by the government. They received a wide support from the media. The power station project was abandoned after the presidential elections of 1981, which brought François Mitterrand to power.

In 2014, the Bonnets Rouges destroyed hundreds of highway speed cameras, tax portals, and tax bureau offices in their successful direct action campaign to have the "ecotaxe" abolished.

== Bibliography ==
=== Surveys and reference books ===
- Cornette, Joël (2008a). Histoire de la Bretagne et des Bretons : Des âges obscurs au règne de Louis XIV (tome 1) (in French). Le Seuil. ISBN 978-2757809952.
- Cornette, Joël (2008b). Histoire de la Bretagne et des Bretons : Des Lumières au XXIe (tome 2) (in French). Le Seuil. ISBN 978-2757809969.
- Monnier, Jean-Jacques; Cassard, Jean-Christophe (2012). Toute l'Histoire de Bretagne : Des origines à nos jours (in French). Morlaix: Skol Vreizh. ISBN 978-2-915623-79-6.
- Croix, Alain (1996). Bretagne, images et histoire (in French). Rennes: Presses Universitaires de Rennes. ISBN 2-909275-74-4.
- Cassard, Jean-Christophe; Croix, Alain; Le Quéau, Jean-René; Veillard, Jean-Yves (2008). Dictionnaire d'histoire de Bretagne (in French). Skol Vreizh. ISBN 978-2915623451.
- Delumeau, Jean (2000). Histoire de la Bretagne (in French). Privat. ISBN 2708917048.

=== Prehistory and protohistory ===
- Fleuriot, Léon (1980). Les origines de la Bretagne. Éd. Payot. ISBN 2-228-12710-8.
- Tonnerre, Noël-Yves (1994). Naissance de la Bretagne. Presse de l' Université d' Angers. OCLC 1170517706.
- Dillon, Myles; Chadwick, Nora (1967). The Celtic Realms. London: Weidenfeld & Nicolson.

=== Middle ages ===
- E.G.Bowen Saints seaways and settlements University of Wales Press, 1977. ISBN 0-900768-30-4.
- Christian Y.M. Kerboul Les royaumes brittoniques au Très Haut Moyen Age Editions du Pontig-Coop Breizh, 1997. ISBN 2-84346-030-1.
- Jean Kerhervé, L'État Breton aux 14e et 15e siècles, 2 vol., Maloine, 1987. ISBN 2-224-01703-0. ISBN 2-224-01704-9.
- Myles Dillon, Nora Chadwick, Christian-J. Guyonvarc'h Les royaumes celtiques Librairie Arthème Fayard, 1974. ISBN 2-213-00077-8.

=== Brittany as a French province ===
- Michel de Mauny, 1532-1790 Les dessous de l' Union de la Bretagne à la France, Editions France-Empire, Rennes, 1986.
- Marcel Planiol, Histoire des Institutions de la Bretagne (Droit Public et Droit Privé), Ouvrage couronné par l' Institut, publié avec le concours du Centre National de la Recherche Scientifique, 3 vol., Editions du cercle de Brocéliande, Rennes 1953–1955.

=== Revolutionary history ===
- Carrier, Jean-Baptiste; Carrier, E. H. (1920). Correspondence of Jean-Baptiste Carrier (people's Representative to the Convention) during His Mission in Brittany, 1793–1794. London; New York: John Lane.
- William Doyle. The Oxford History of the French Revolution. Oxford: Oxford University Press, 1989.
- Kropotkin, Petr (1927). The Great French Revolution. Translated by N.F. Dryhurst. New York: Vanguard Printings.
- Palmer, Robert Roswell (1941). Twelve Who Ruled: The Committee of Public Safety during the Terror. Princeton, NJ: Princeton University Press.
- Popkin, Jeremy D. (2015). A Short History of the French Revolution (6th ed.). London: Routledge. ISBN 9781315508924.

=== Further reading ===
- Armand Du Chatellier. Histoire De La Révolution En Bretagne. Berrien: Morvan, 1977.
- G. Lenotre. Tragic Episodes of the French Revolution in Brittany: with Unpublished Documents. D. Nutt, 1912.
- Donald Sutherland. The Chouans: the Social Origins of Popular Counter-Revolution in Upper Brittany, 1770–1796. Oxford: Oxford University Press, 1982.

== See also ==
- Breton literature
- List of Breton historians
- Viking Brittany
- Saint-Sauveur Church in Brest
