= 843 =

Calendar year

843 in various calendars
Gregorian calendar	843; DCCCXLIII
Ab urbe condita	1596
Armenian calendar	292; ԹՎ ՄՂԲ
Assyrian calendar	5593
Balinese saka calendar	764–765
Bengali calendar	249–250
Berber calendar	1793
Buddhist calendar	1387
Burmese calendar	205
Byzantine calendar	6351–6352
Chinese calendar	壬戌年 (Water Dog); 3540 or 3333 — to — 癸亥年 (Water Pig); 3541 or 3334
Coptic calendar	559–560
Discordian calendar	2009
Ethiopian calendar	835–836
Hebrew calendar	4603–4604
- Hindu calendars
Vikram Samvat	899–900
Shaka Samvat	764–765
Kali Yuga	3943–3944
Holocene calendar	10843
Iranian calendar	221–222
Islamic calendar	228–229
Japanese calendar	Jōwa 10 (承和１０年)
Javanese calendar	740–741
Julian calendar	843; DCCCXLIII
Korean calendar	3176
Minguo calendar	1069 before ROC 民前1069年
Nanakshahi calendar	−625
Seleucid era	1154/1155 AG
Thai solar calendar	1385–1386
Tibetan calendar	ཆུ་ཕོ་ཁྱི་ལོ་ (male Water-Dog); 969 or 588 or −184 — to — ཆུ་མོ་ཕག་ལོ་ (female Water-Boar); 970 or 589 or −183

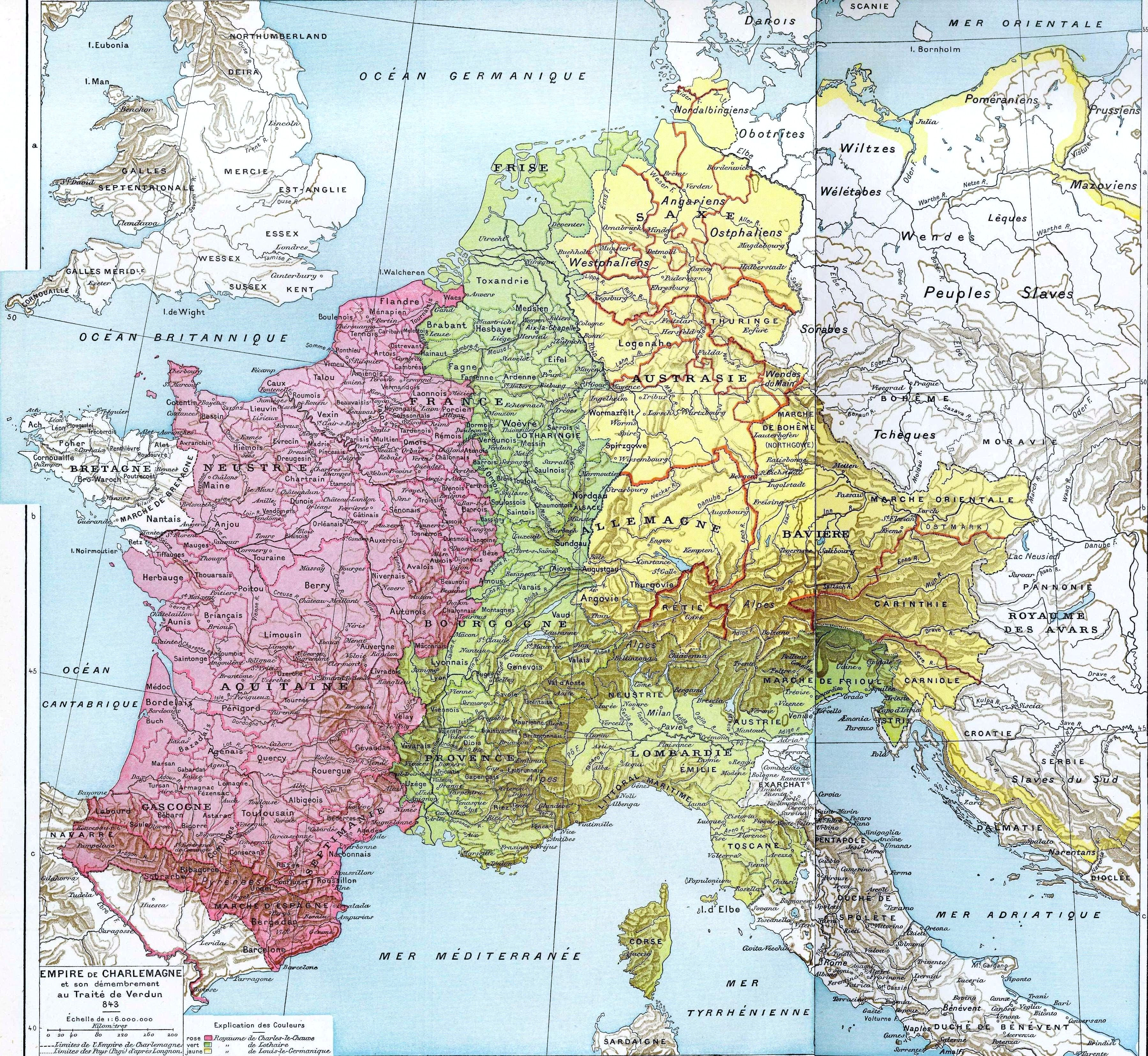
The parting of the Frankish Empire (843)

Year 843 (DCCCXLIII) was a common year starting on Monday of the Julian calendar.

== Events ==
=== By place ===
==== Europe ====
- May 24 – Battle of Blain: Breton forces under Erispoe, count of Vannes, defeat the Franks led by Renaud d'Herbauges, near the town of Messac, at the River Vilaine. This battle marks a Breton war between Charles the Bald and Nominoe, duke of Brittany.
- Summer – Viking raiders attack Nantes, located on the River Loire; they kill the town's bishop along with many of the clergy, and murder men, women and children. They plunder the western parts of Aquitaine and reach an island north of the mouth of the River Garonne, near what later will be La Rochelle. There the Vikings bring materials from the mainland and build houses to spend the winter.
- August 10 – Treaty of Verdun: The Frankish Empire is divided into three kingdoms, between the three surviving sons of the late emperor Louis the Pious. King Louis the German receives the eastern portion (everything east of the River Rhine), called the Eastern Frankish Realm, which is the precursor to modern-day Germany. Emperor Lothair I receives the central portion (Low Countries, Alsace, Lorraine, Burgundy and the northern half of Italy), called the Central Frankish Realm. King Charles the Bald receives the western portion (everything west of the River Rhône), called the Western Frankish Realm, which later becomes France.

==== British Isles ====
- King Kenneth MacAlpin (Cináed mac Ailpín) of the Scots also becomes king of the Picts; he is crowned (on the Stone of Destiny) as first monarch of the new nation of Scotland. The Alpin Dynasty of Scottish kings begins to reign.

==== Arabian Empire ====
- Summer – A Byzantine expedition, led by Theoktistos, conquers Crete from the Saracens. After initial success, he is forced to abandon his army, due to political intrigues in Constantinople. The troops are left behind and slaughtered by the Arabs.
- Al-Andalus: The city of Zaragossa rises against the Umayyad Emirate of Córdoba in modern-day Spain.

==== Asia ====
- In the Chinese capital of Chang'an, a large fire consumes 4,000 homes, warehouses and other buildings in the East Market, yet the rest of the city is at a safe distance from the blaze which is largely quarantined in East Central Chang'an, thanks to the large width of roads in Chang'an that produce fire breaks.

=== By topic ===
==== Religion ====
- March 11 – Feast of Orthodoxy – Official end of Iconoclasm: Empress Theodora II restores the veneration of icons in the Orthodox churches in the Byzantine Empire.
- Theodora II orders a persecution against the Paulicians throughout Anatolia; about 100,000 followers in the Byzantine theme of Armenia are massacred.

== Births ==
- Judith of Flanders, queen of Wessex and countess of Flanders (approximate date)

== Deaths ==
- April 19 – Judith of Bavaria, Frankish empress
- 2 November – Anthony the Confessor, Byzantine bishop of Thessalinike
- Al-Mada'ini, Muslim scholar and historian (b. 752)
- Ardo Smaragdus, Frankish abbot and hagiographer
- Bridei VI, king of the Picts (Scotland)
- Fergus mac Fothaid, king of Connacht (Ireland)
- Fujiwara no Otsugu, Japanese statesman (b. 773)
- Jia Dao, Chinese poet and Buddhist monk (b. 779)
- Landulf I, gastald (or count) of Capua (Italy)
- Liu Congjian, Chinese governor (jiedushi) (b. 803)
- Qiu Shiliang, Chinese eunuch official
- Renaud d'Herbauges, Frankish nobleman (b. 795)
