= Ricwin of Nantes =

Ricwin, Ricuin, Richwin, or Richovin (died 25 June 841) was the Count of Nantes from 831 to 841. A Rihwinus comes witnessed the will of Charlemagne in 811.

A fidelis of Louis the Pious, Ricwin was named count in the Nantais and the Breton March after the exile of Lambert I. In 832, with Rainier, Bishop of Vannes, he opposed the creation of Redon Abbey by Saint Conwoïon, supported by Nominoë. Ricwin died in the Battle of Fontenay-en-Puisaye fighting on the side of Charles the Bald.

Titles of nobility
Preceded by Lambert	Count of Nantes; 831–841	Succeeded by Renaud
