= Redon Abbey =

Abbey in Ille-et-Vilaine, France

Coordinates: 47.650°N 2.084°W

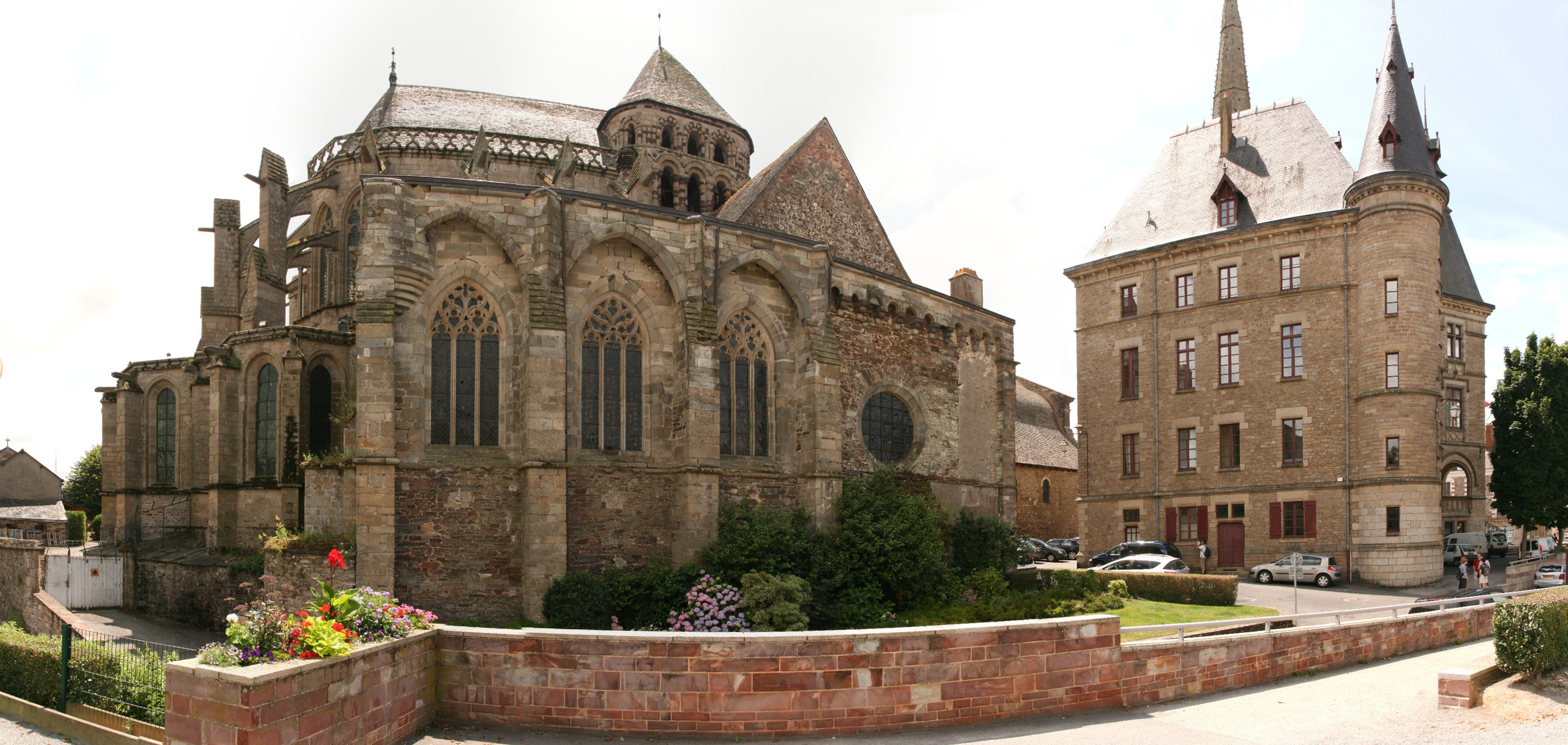
Abbey church and monastery (2009)

Redon Abbey, or Abbey of Saint-Sauveur, Redon ("Abbey of the Holy Saviour"; French: Abbaye Saint-Sauveur de Redon), in Redon in the present Ille-et-Vilaine, Brittany, France, is a former Benedictine abbey founded in 832 by Saint Conwoïon, at the point where the Oust flows into the Vilaine, on the border between Neustria and Brittany.

== History ==
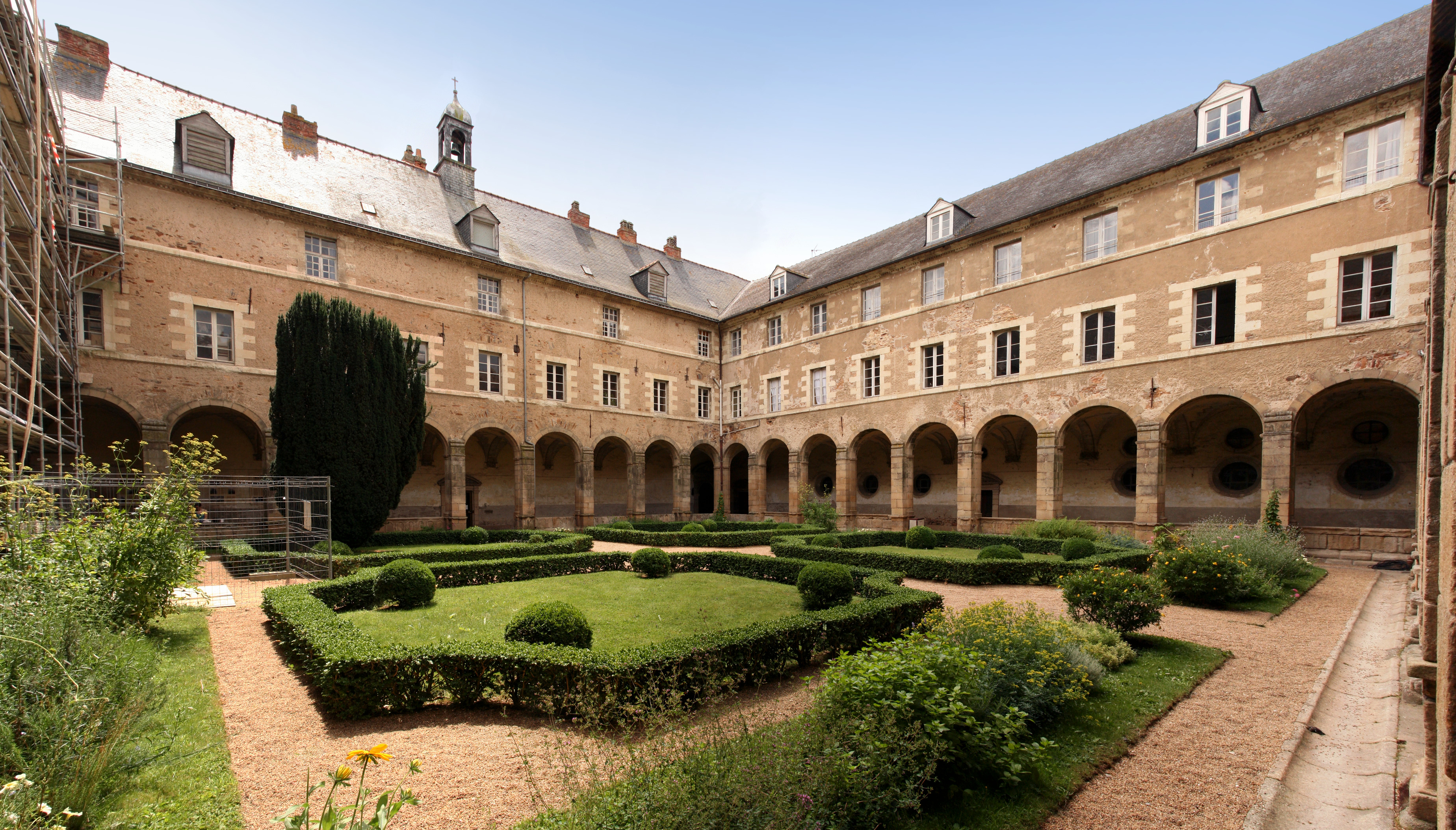
Abbey courtyard (2009)

In 832 Ratwili, a local noble, gave Conwoïon and his companions a piece of land on a bleak hill (locus desertus) overlooking the confluence of the Oust and the Vilaine, where Conwoïon founded a monastery, dedicated to the Holy Saviour, and became its first abbot.

Both Count Ricwin of Nantes and Raginarius (Rainer), Bishop of Vannes, refused at first to support the new foundation, and influenced the Emperor Louis the Pious against it. In 834 however the new monastery gained the patronage of Nominoe, princeps and later the first Duke of Brittany, as evidenced by his charter to it, which was witnessed by Bishop Raginarius, who had apparently overcome his initial opposition. After determined intervention on Conwoïon's behalf by both Ermor, Bishop of Aleth, and Felix, Bishop of Quimper, the Emperor Louis consented to recognise the new foundation, on 27 November 834. In a diploma of 850 Charles the Bald, Louis' successor, granted it immunity and confirmed his protection. Conwoïon's relations to Raginarius's successor, Bishop Susannus of Vannes (838-848) were however apparently strained, as Conwoïon denounced him for his mode of life to the pope. It was the next bishop, Courantgern (850-868), who at length abolished the episcopal supervision of the abbey because of Norman raids, which made it too dangerous for monks to travel overland to Vannes for their ordination.

When the founder, Ratwili, fell ill, the monks were able to cure him. Out of gratitude he sent his son Liberius into the monastery as an oblate and made it further gifts of land. The abbey also received numerous gifts from local free peasants (machtierni), which admittedly were often contested by their relatives. Additionally, in the Frankish lands east of the Vilaine the abbey gradually acquired possessions, which they increased by strategic land purchases. Some smaller monasteries seem to have put themselves under the authority of Redon, more or less willingly. By 870 there were already 25 monks in the community.

In 863 Salomon, Duke of Brittany, (857-874) gave the abbey an estate at Plélan, where Conwoïon built a church and a monastery, dedicated to Saint Maixent from the wonder-working relics held there of Saint Maxentius of Poitou (French: Maixent).

In 867 Conwoïon stepped down from the office of abbot on account of his advanced age, and died a year later, on 5 January 868. His successor was Ritcant (867-871). During his leadership Redon, like the whole region round the mouths of the Loire and the Vilaine, suffered greatly from the attacks of the heathen Normans. In 852 the church escaped destruction only by an apparent miracle: the Normans were sailing up the Loire in two fleets, when they were forced by a storm to take shelter in the abandoned church, where they lit the candles from the altar and some drank the communion wine. Those who drank the wine, became delirious and died, while those who had not drunk it, survived.

The monks of Redon were at last forced by the invasions to withdraw in 921 to Auxerre and in 924 to Poitou, and were not able to return to their own monastery until the end of the 10th century.

The abbey reached its height during the late 11th century and the 12th century, when it governed 27 priories and 12 parishes throughout Brittany, and was a popular pilgrimage destination.

Francis I, Duke of Brittany, was particularly fond of Redon and wished to be buried in the abbey. In 1449, as a sign of his favour, he petitioned Pope Eugene IV to have Redon made the seat of a diocese, with the abbot as bishop, and a bull to that effect was issued on 10 June 1449. The neighbouring bishops of Rennes, Vannes and Nantes, whose territories would have been reduced by the creation of the new diocese, protested so much, however, that the Pope reversed his decision and issued another bull suppressing it, on 20 December 1449. Francis I was nevertheless buried in the abbey church after his death on 18 July 1450.

In 1478 the abbey passed into the control of commendatory abbots, among whom was Cardinal Richelieu, from 1622. It was suppressed in 1790 during the French Revolution.

In 1839 the property was acquired by the Eudists, who transformed it into a college. It is now a private Catholic school.

== Other burials ==
- Erispoe
- Nominoe
- Alan IV, Duke of Brittany

== Buildings ==
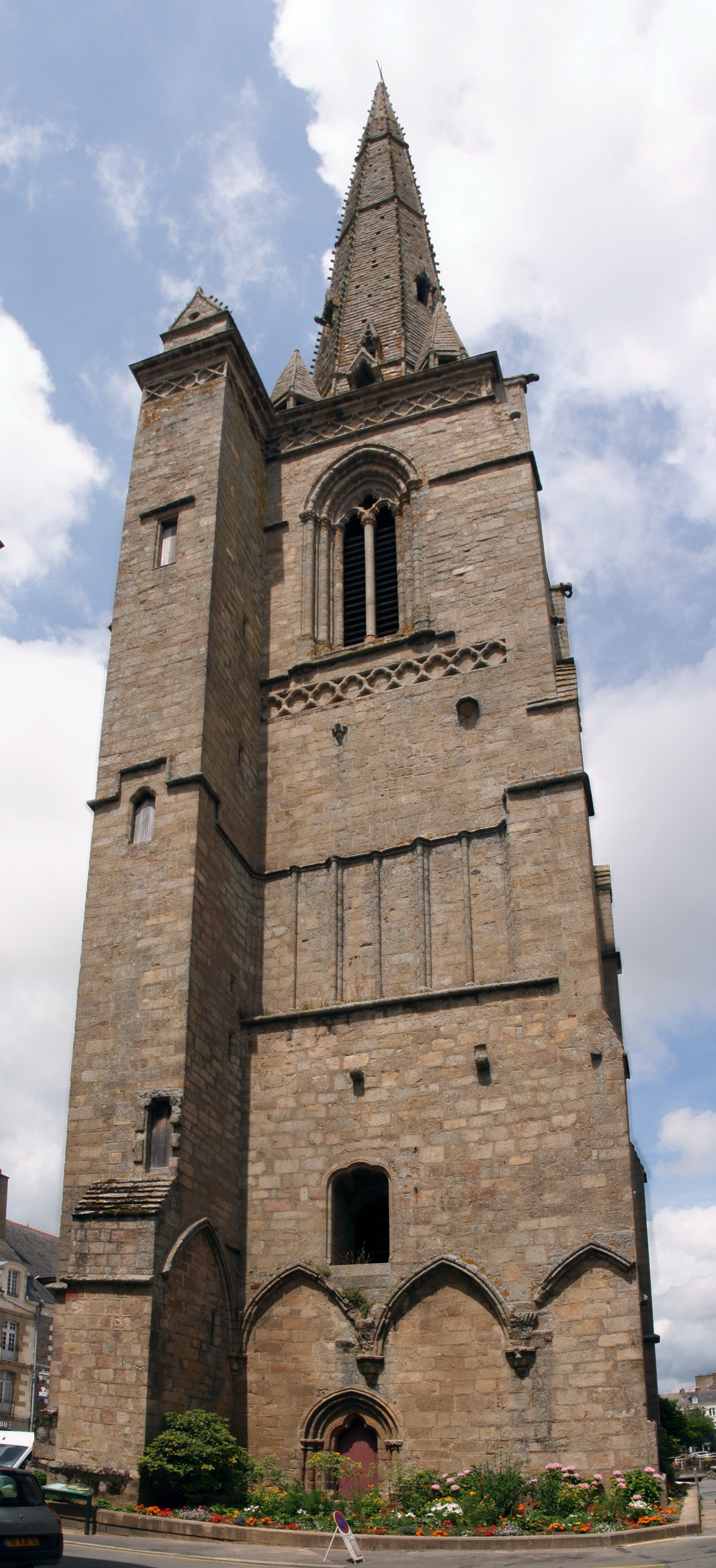
Gothic bell tower (2009)

Under Conwoïon two churches were built, one dedicated to Christ the Saviour (Sanctus Salvator) and the other to the Blessed Virgin Mary. The former, a Romanesque construction, was dedicated on 28 October 832/833. The altar contained relics of Saint Epetème or Apodème, Bishop of Angers (Hypothemius or Apodemius of Angers) which Conwoïon had acquired by dubious means. Pope Leo IV later made the abbey a gift of the relics of Saint Marcellinus of Angers. From 849 Redon also possessed relics of the Breton Saint Melor.

The monastery consisted of a dormitory, gatehouse, guesthouse, an infirmary and a garden, where Saint Condeloc worked: among other things he dismissed a plague of caterpillars by an appeal to the Holy Trinity. The former chapter house is now a separate chapel.

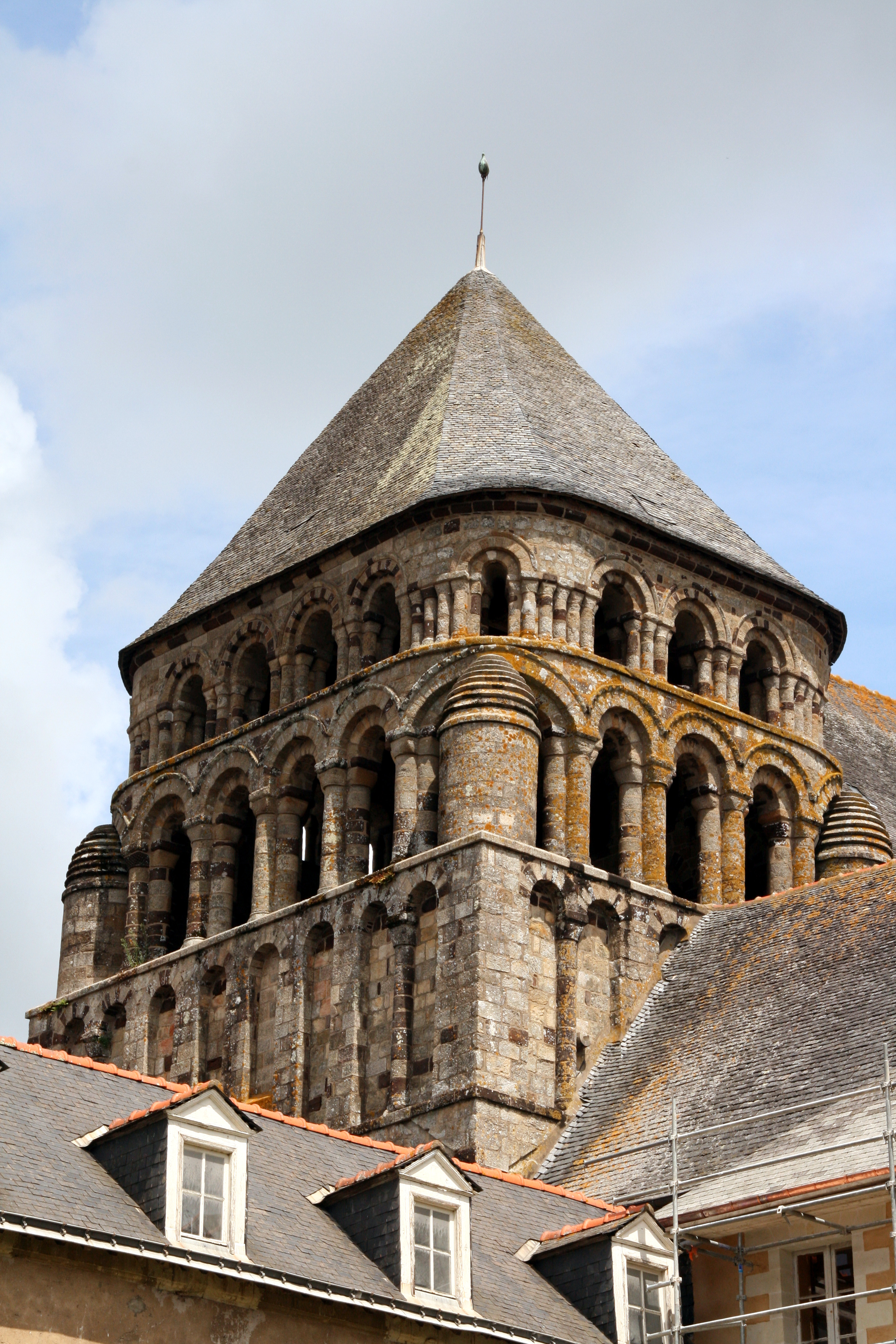
Romanesque tower (2009)

The crossing tower and parts of the porch are Romanesque, of the 11th century.. The nave, with an octagonal cupola, was extended in the 12th century in the Gothic style, and the transept and the cloister were also added then. The present choir is of the 13th century. A fire in 1780 damaged the nave, and it was rebuilt shorter than it had been previously. This accounts for the separation of the Gothic bell tower, which before the fire was attached to the body of the church. During restorations in 1950 medieval frescoes were revealed. The stained glass is contemporary.

== Cartulary and archives ==
By the time of Conwoïon's death the abbey apparently already possessed an archive of several hundred documents. About 350 manuscripts from this period have been preserved, but it is certain that between 1773 and 1856 an unknown number of items were lost (Smith 2001, 373).

The extensive cartulary of Redon Abbey, containing copies of documents from the foundation up to the 12th century, survives, and has been published in two editions. It is a record of great importance for the history of Brittany.

== Related articles ==
- Primaudière Priory
- Saint-Sauveur Abbey Church of Redon

== Sources and external links ==
- Smith, Julia, 2001: The making of a ninth-century holy place, in: Mayke de Jong/Francis Theuws (eds.), Topographies of power in the early Middle Ages, pp. 361–395, vol.6 of Transformation of the Roman World. Leiden: Brill. Transformation of the Roman World. ISSN 1386-4165
- Aurélien de Courson, 1863: Cartulaire de l'abbaye de Redon en Bretagne. P., Imprimerie impériale (Collection de documents inédits sur l'Histoire de France; 1re série: Histoire politique); available online at Gallica (in French)
- Hubert Guillotel, André Chédeville et Bernard Tanguy, 1998: Cartulaire de l'abbaye Saint-Sauveur de Redon - tome I. Rennes, ed. Association des Amis des Archives historiques du diocèse de Rennes Dol et Saint-Malo
- Jean-Pierre Brunterc'h, Hubert Guillotel, Bernard Tanguy et al., 2004: Cartulaire de l'abbaye Saint-Sauveur de Redon - tome II. Rennes, ed. Association des Amis des Archives historiques du diocèse de Rennes, Dol et Saint-Malo (studies on the lost part of the cartulary, on the second cartulary, on the lettering and the inks, with a general index)
- Base Mérimée: Eglise Saint-Sauveur (ancienne basilique), French Ministry of Culture (in French)
- Base Mérimée: Abbaye de bénédictins Saint-Sauveur, French Ministry of Culture (in French)
- Media related to Redon Abbey at Wikimedia Commons
