= Bjørn (fl. 856–858) =

Viking Chieftain

Bjørn (Latin: Berno) was a Viking chieftain. He is the earliest known Scandinavian who was not a relative of the Danish kings to enter the service of a Frankish king, in his case Charles the Bald, king of West Francia. He may be identified with the Swedish king Björn Ironside.

In July 856 a Viking chieftain named Sidroc entered the River Seine to pillage. On 19 August he was joined by a fleet commanded by Bjørn. Come winter Sidroc left Frankish waters while Bjørn built a fortified camp on an island called Oscellus, probably Oissel. The Vikings proceeded to raid as far as Bayeux and Évreux, and the entire region showed little resistance to their movements throughout 857. (The Annales Fontanellenses, an important source for these events, incorrectly date them to 855.)

The surviving sources do not record Bjørn's reasons for visiting King Charles at Verberie early in 858. In the words of the Annales Bertiniani, the preeminent West Frankish annals for the period: “Bjørn, leader of the faction of pirates of the Seine, pursuing King Charles came to the palace in Veberie, and giving him his hands, swore fidelity to him.” Bjørn had probably been offered tribute (danegeld) in return for submitting to the act of commendation (the giving of hands and swearing of fealty). In November the bishops of West Francia, meeting in a synod at Quercy, sent a letter, probably authored by Hincmar, to Louis the German, the king of East Francia, in which the raising of tribute to pay off the Vikings is mentioned. Probably this refers to Bjørn and his men, since no other Vikings are known to have made their peace with the Franks at about this time.

According to the Annales Fontanellenses Charles the Bald besieged Oissel late in 859 (actually 858). Since Bjørn is never again mentioned by name in the annals it is probable that he remained loyal to Charles and did not rejoin the army that remained at the island stronghold. The Annales Bertiniani confirm that Charles only besieged the island after Bjørn's commendation.
