= Conwoïon =

Breton saint and abbot

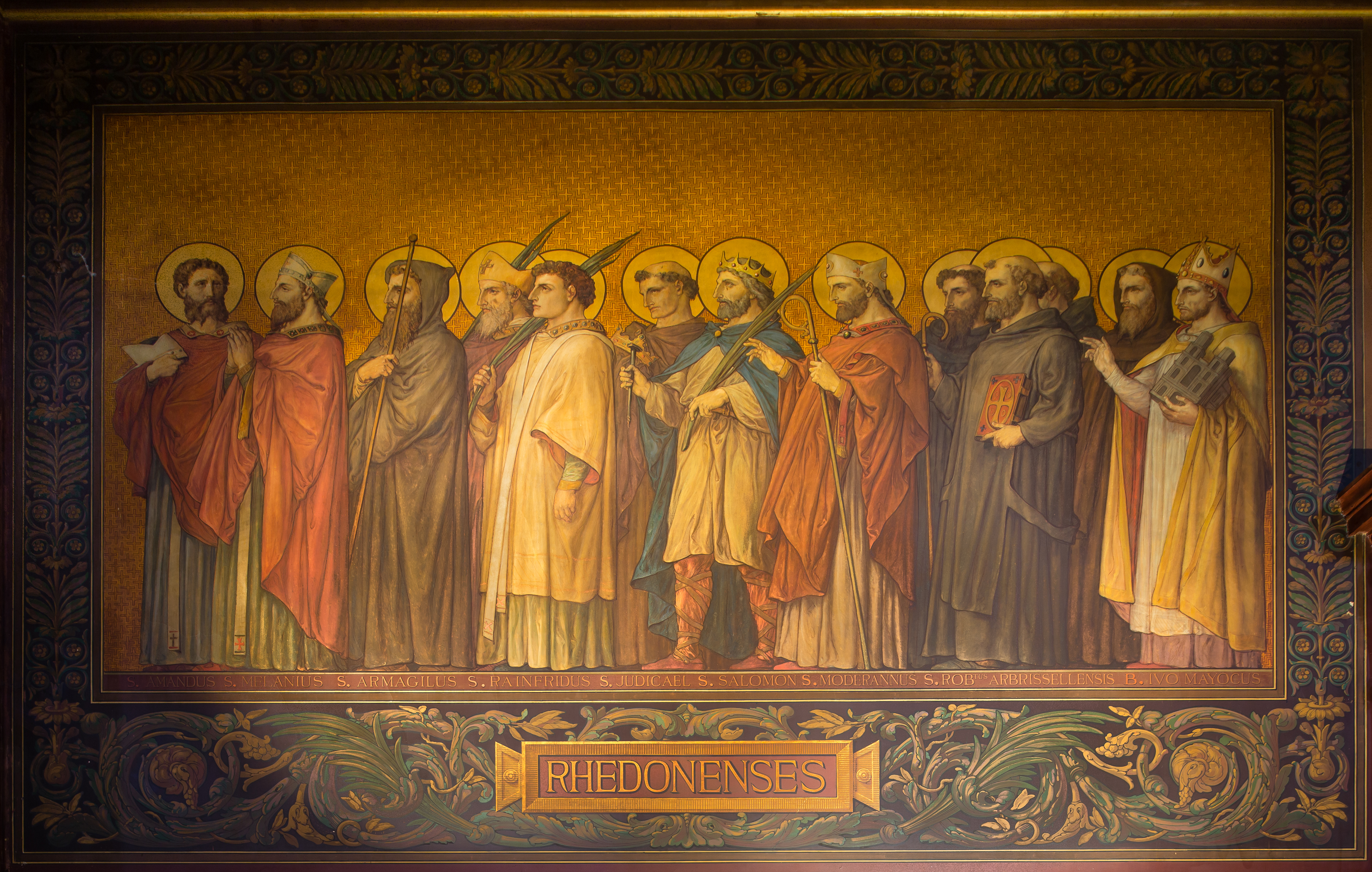

Saint Conwoïon (or Convoyon or Konvoion) was a Breton saint and abbot. He was probably born around 800 at Comblessac (Ille-et-Vilaine) into a Gallo-Roman family descended, or claiming descent, from Roman senators ("ex genere senatorio").

He succeeded in the foundation of a new abbey dedicated to Saint Maixent in the present village of Saint-Maxent, now in the commune of Plélan-le-Grand, where he died in 868.

He was also instrumental in the foundation of Redon Abbey in 832, where he was the first abbot. He acted as adviser to Nominoe, first Duke of Brittany, in his relations with Charles the Bald.

The feast day of Saint Conwoïon is 5 January.

== Biography ==
The form found in the charters is Konuuoion, but later sources include the French form Convoyon and the Breton form Konvoion. Of Celtic languages origin, the proper name “Conwoion” is composed of kon, meaning “warrior,” and uuoion, meaning “sincere”.
