= Annals of Fontenelle =

The Annals of Fontenelle (Annales Fontanellenses, Chronicon Fontanellense) or Chronicle of Saint-Wandrille (Chronicon sancti Wandregesili) is a short history compiled at the Abbey of Saint-Wandrille between 840 and 856. It is in annalistic form and its primarily concerns are local.

The Annales are an important source for the raid of the Viking chiefs Sidroc and Bjørn in 856–58, and also for King Charles the Bald's war with Nominoe, the duke of Brittany. Ferdinand Lot found the Annales to be generally unreliable with dates and dated their composition to after 872.

A French translation of the Annales was published by Jean Laporte in the Mélanges de la Société d'Histoire de Normandie in 1951. An English translation by Christian Cooijmans was published as a special volume of Apardjón Journal for Scandinavian Studies in 2022.
