= Battle of Ballon =

845 AD battle between West Francia and the Duchy of Brittany

Coordinates: 47°42′16″N 2°04′13″W

Date	22 November 845
Location	Redon, Ille-et-Vilaine, Brittany
Result	Breton victory

Belligerents
Kingdom of Brittany	Kingdom of West Francia

Commanders and leaders
Nominoë	Charles the Bald

Strength
c. 1,000 Bretons	c. 3,000 Franks

The Battle of Ballon took place on 22 November 845 between the forces of Charles the Bald, king of West Francia, and Nominoë, Duke of Brittany. Nominoë was appropriating border territory and opposing Charles' attempt to impose Frankish authority. Nominoë defeated Charles, initiating a period of Breton expansion and consolidation of power.

== Background ==
Following the death of Louis the Pious, Nominoë initially supported Charles the Bald in the dispute between him and his brothers over control of Frankish territory. However, when Count Ricuin of Nantes was killed at the Battle of Fontenoy, Charles refused to accept Lambert II as his successor, since Lambert's father, Lambert I, had fought against Charles. Charles replaced him with his supporter Renaud, Count of Herbauge. While Nominoë was ill, Renaud attacked Breton territory, but was killed in battle by the Bretons led by Erispoe, Nominoë's son, in alliance with Lambert. This allowed Lambert to occupy Nantes with the support of Nominoë. Recovered from his illness, Nominoë hoped to take advantage of the disorder to expand into Frankish territory.

On campaign in Aquitaine, Charles was initially unable to respond to the incursions. Learning of Charles's difficult military position in Toulouse, Nominoë continued his offensive, raiding Maine.

In 845, Charles concluded a peace with Pepin II of Aquitaine and was reconciled with Lambert II of Nantes, freeing him to deal with the threat from Nominoë. In November, he had intended to participate in a religious festival in Tours, but he decided to strike against Nominoë instead, having heard that a faction of discontented Bretons would defect to him if he hastened to their aid.

== Battle ==
Charles quickly assembled an army of around 3,000 men. Nominoë's men were probably much fewer in number, comprising mostly a highly-mobile light cavalry.

Nominoë lured the king into marshland at the confluence of the Oust and the Aff between Redon and Bains-sur-Oust, near Ballon Abbey - hence the name of the battle. The Bretons were then able to exploit their knowledge of this treacherous wetland territory.

Details of the events of the actual battle are sketchy. Reports simply state that Charles was defeated. According to the Annals of Saint-Bertin: "Charles had recklessly attacked Gallic Britain [Brittany] with limited forces, slipping up by a reversal of fortune..." According to First Annales de Fontenelle: "The Franks entered Brittany and engaged in battle with the Bretons, November 22. Helped by the difficulty of the wetland location, the Bretons proved the better."

== Aftermath and significance ==
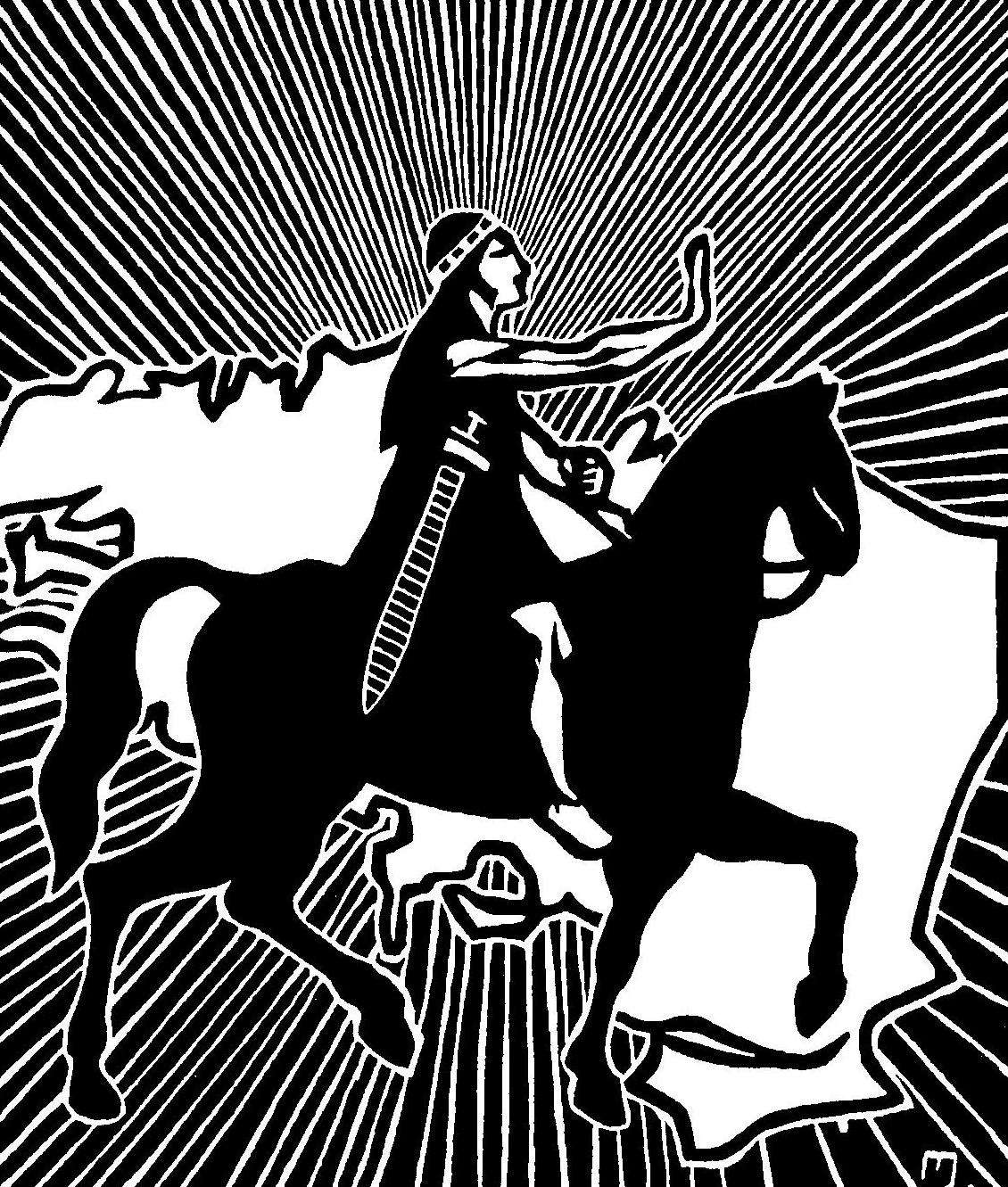
Nominoe Triumphant: Tad ar Vro, Breton nationalist image of Nominoë as master of the territory of Brittany secured by the battle.

Following his defeat, rumors circulated that Charles had been killed, forcing him to make a quick public appearance in Maine. While there, he rebuilt his army and headed back towards Brittany late in 846. There he concluded a treaty with Nominoë, though the exact content of the agreement is unknown. Despite this a "cold war" persisted, and Breton raids continued into Frankish territory at Christmas of that year. Nevertheless, the agreement remained unbroken until 849.

This relatively minor battle is often confused with the much more decisive Battle of Jengland won by Nominoë's son Erispoe against Charles in 851. This confusion dates to Arthur de la Borderie's 1894 History of Brittany and has been repeated many times since. However, it is to the battle of Ballon that some date the birth of a unified and independent Brittany, behind a single sovereign: Nominoë. The expansionist policy of Nominoë, by the conquest of the former Marches of Brittany, a Frankish buffer zone, was continued by Erispoe, who consolidated the borders of medieval Brittany.

In the twentieth century the battle was given emblematic status by Breton nationalists. In 1952 the battle was commemorated by the nationalist group Koun Breizh, who funded the erection of a statue of Nominoë by the artist Raffig Tullou in Bains-sur-Oust, near the site of the victory. Another nationalist group, Bretagne 845, founded in 1982, was named from the date of the battle. It merged with Koun Breizh in 1994.
