= Battle of Jengland =

Battle between the Duchy of Brittany and West Francia (851 CE)

Coordinates: 47°43′26″N 1°43′55″W

Date	22 August 851
Location	Grand-Fougeray (Ille-et-Vilaine), Brittany
Result	Decisive Breton victory

Belligerents
Duchy of Brittany	Kingdom of West Francia

Commanders and leaders
Duke Erispoe	King Charles the Bald

Strength
1,000	4,000

The Battle of Jengland (also called Jengland-Beslé, Beslé, or Grand Fougeray) took place on 22 August 851, between the West Frankish army of Charles the Bald and the Breton army of Erispoe, Duke of Brittany. The Bretons were victorious, leading to the signing of the Treaty of Angers in September 851 and the recognition of Erispoe as the legitimate ruler of the Bretons under Charles.

== Background ==
In 845, Nominoë, Duke of Brittany, had defeated Charles the Bald at the Battle of Ballon. A truce had followed, but in 849 Nominoë resumed his offensive against the Franks. He sought to establish full personal control over his duchy and extend its territory. In 851, Frankish garrisons left in the previous year in Rennes and Nantes capitulated to Nominoë, who raided eastwards, ravaging Le Mans. Nominoë then decided to advance to Chartres, but died suddenly, near Vendôme.

His son and successor, Erispoe, took command of the Breton force and continued its offensive in alliance with Lambert II of Nantes, a renegade Frank dispossessed by Charles the Bald.

Faced with the threat, Charles sought the support of his brother Louis the German, obtaining a contingent of Saxons to increase the size of his force. He marched to confront Erispoe, who retreated back to the borders of Brittany. Both leaders probably led smallish armies, with Charles commanding around 4,000 troops and Erispoe around 1,000.

== Battle ==
In August, Charles left Maine to enter Brittany by the Roman road from Nantes to Corseul. He arranged his troops in two lines:

- at the rear were the Franks;
- in front were Saxon mercenaries whose role was to break the assault of the Breton cavalry, which was known for its mobility and tenacity.

In the initial engagement, a javelin assault forced Saxons to retreat behind the more heavily armoured Frankish line. The Franks were taken by surprise. Rather than engage in a melée, the Bretons harassed the heavily armed Franks from a distance, in a manner comparable to Parthian tactics, but with javelins rather than archers. They alternated furious charges, feints, and sudden withdrawals, drawing out the Franks and encircling over-extended groups.

After two days of this sort of fighting, Frankish losses in men and horses were mounting to catastrophic levels, while the Bretons suffered few casualties. With his force disintegrating, Charles withdrew from the field during the night. When his disappearance was noticed the following morning, panic seized the Frankish soldiers. The Bretons quickly raided the camp, taking booty and weapons and killing as many fugitives as they could.

== Treaty of Angers ==
The battle redefined relations between the Franks and Bretons. Charles the Bald agreed to meet Erispoe in Angers, on the outskirts of the now-extended territory of Brittany.

=== The King in the Empire ===
In September, Erispoe submitted to Charles as Emperor, while receiving the title of king in return.

According to the Annals of Saint-Bertin "Erispoe, son of Nominoë from Charles, in the City of Angers submitted and received a gift of symbols of the monarchy that came from his father, adding also Rennais, Nantais and Retz."

By the treaty, Erispoe remained in principle subject to Charles the Bald, but could now also see himself Charles's equal, able to use the title of Rex. Charles recognized the authority of Breton rulers over the areas around Rennes, Nantes, and Pays de Retz, which had previously formed the Frankish "Breton March", a border zone. Erispoe, at the same time, absorbed a non-Breton speaking population of Gallo-Roman and Romano-Frankish peoples.

=== Border demarcation ===
The Treaty of Angers demarcated the borders of the medieval Duchy of Brittany and the later French province of Brittany. It also marked a turning point in relations between the Western Franks and Brittany. Later Breton dukes were able to extend their territory further, but were unable to hold it for long. The Treaty of Angers essentially defined the limits of historic Brittany. The peace created by the regularisation of Franco-Breton relations also gave the Bretons the stability to fend off later Viking attacks.
