= Sébastien Le Balp =

Sébastien Le Balp (born 1639, Kergloff, died 1675) was a Breton politician. In 1664 he was royal notary at Carhaix, and he later became one of the leaders of the Revolt of the Papier Timbré in the Poher region of Cornouaille in July and August 1675.

When the revolt won over Lower Brittany, Le Balp organised it. At the start of September 1675, he and six hundred Bonnets Rouges besieged and pillaged château du Tymeur and burned all its papers and archives.

Le Balp mobilised the peasants and tried to maximize their efforts, but he was killed by a surprise sword thrust from his prisoner Charles Maurice de Percin, marquis de Montgaillard, on the night of 3 September, on the eve of the planned uprising.

== Bibliography ==
- (in French) Yann Brekilien, Prestiges du Finistère, aux Éditions France-Empire.
- (in French) Yann Brekilien, Histoire de la Bretagne, ed. France Empire, 2004 (grand nombre d'éditions antérieures sur 30 ans), ISBN 2-7048-0947-X,
- (in French) Armand Puillandre, Sébastien Le Balp – Bonnets Rouges et papier timbré, Éditions Keltia Graphic – Kan an Douar, Landelo-Speied, 1996.
