= Lambert II of Nantes =

Frankish noble

Lambert II (died 852) was the Frankish Count of Nantes and Prefect of the Breton March between 843 and 851. Lambert ruled the county in opposition to Amaury, the puppet count installed by Charles the Bald, King of West Francia. At his death, the county was effectively in Breton control. Lambert was the son of Lambert I (Note: "...in all probability he was the son of the earlier Count Lambert.") and his wife Itta.

== Defeat of Renaud ==
Lambert initially served Charles the Bald, fighting with him at the Battle of Fontenoy (841). He turned against Charles when his rival Renaud d'Herbauges was made Count of Nantes in place of him. Disappointed in his ambitions, Lambert II broke with Charles the Bald and turned to Nominoe, Duke of Brittany, who was then in almost open revolt against the Franks. Lambert gathered soldiers on the borders of Anjou, intending to advance on the river Vilaine to join his forces with Nominoe.

Renaud fortified Nantes, but learning of a serious illness that had temporarily incapacitated Nominoe, he decided to strike first. Renaud invaded Breton territory at the junction of the Diocese of Alet and County of Nantes, on the Roman road of Angers-Carhaix. An army of Bretons led by Nominoe's son Prince Erispoe was crossing the Vilaine at Messac when Renaud attacked. At the Battle of Messac, Erispoe was initially defeated by Renaud. Shortly afterwards, however, the timely arrival of Lambert's troops allowed Erispoe to counter-attack in force, defeating Renaud. Renaud himself was killed the day afterwards, during the pursuit. The allies may also have been assisted by the Viking warlord Hastein, who is said to have personally killed Renaud. However, other sources assert that Lambert killed Renaud and that the Viking force arrived shortly afterwards, looking for plunder.

Lambert occupied Nantes, but was unable to hold it. The Vikings sacked the town and killed its bishop. Charles the Bald appointed Amaury to replace Renaud.

In the following year Bernard of Poitiers formed an alliance with Renaud's son Hervé, Count of Herbauges against Lambert. Lambert and the Bretons ambushed and killed them both in Maine.

== Reconciliation and renewed rebellion ==
Lambert became a consistent ally of Nominoe and Erispoe, fighting with Nominoe against Charles at the Battle of Ballon, which gave Lambert renewed control of Nantes. Amaury remained the nominal count. Lambert was later reconciled to Charles and appointed Count of Angers (845-6), then transferred to Francia. He was officially restored as Count of Nantes in 849. However in 850 Lambert and his brother Warnar renewed their alliance with Nominoe and both raided Maine "with unspeakable fury" according to the Chronicon Fontanellense. In August, Charles marched on Rennes, but avoided fighting. Instead he garrisoned the town and installed Amaury as new Count of Nantes. Immediately after he left, Lambert and Nominoe defeated the garrisons and captured the new Count.

Nominoe died shortly thereafter and Charles attempted once more to reassert his authority. Lambert once again defected to the Breton side and fought with Erispoe in the decisive Battle of Jengland in 851, in which Charles was defeated. Their victory led to the absorption of Nantes into Erispoe's sphere of influence, though Lambert remained count.

After Jengland Lambert sought to carve out territory between Maine and Anjou, but was killed in an ambush by Gauzbert of Maine in the following year.

== Family ==
He married Theodrada (Tetrata), a daughter of Pepin of Italy.

The couple had one confirmed son, Lambert, who succeeded his father as count of Nantes.

== Sources ==
- Smith, Julia M.H. (1992). Provence & Empire: Brittany & the Carolingians. Cambridge University Press.

Titles of nobility
Preceded by Renaud	Count of Nantes; 843–846	Succeeded by Amaury
