= Renaud of Herbauges =

Renaud (795 – 843) was Frankish Count of Herbauges, Count of Poitiers and Count of Nantes. His name is also spelled Rainaldus or Ragenold, and he is sometimes known as Reginald in English. He is referred to as Renaud of Aquitaine, but seems to have been a member of the Rorgonid family of Maine.

The County of Herbauges consisted of three pagi south of the Loire: Arballicus (Herbauges), Metallicus (the Mauges), and Teofalicus (Tiffauges) and was separate from the County of Poitou, of which Renaud also appears to have been Count. His appointment as Count is prior to July 835 when he appears in a battle against the Normans in Noirmoutier.

== Count of Nantes ==
After the death of Count Ricwin of Nantes at the Battle of Fontenoy (841), he was appointed by Charles the Bald as Count of Nantes. This was at the expense of Lambert II of Nantes, who had fought for Charles at Fontenoy, and was considered the legitimate heir of his father, the former Count Lambert I of Nantes. Disappointed in his ambitions, Lambert II broke with Charles the Bald and turned to Nominoe, Duke of Brittany, who was then in almost open revolt against the Franks. Nominoe and Lambert intended to join forces to capture Nantes.

== Invasion of Brittany ==
Having fortified Nantes, Renaud heard that Nominoe had been incapacitated by a serious illness. Renaud decided to take the initiative, by raiding into Breton territory. At the junction of the diocese of Alet and county of Nantes, on the Roman road of Angers Carhaix he surprised the Breton army led by Nominoe's son Prince Erispoe. At the Battle of Messac, Erispoe was initially defeated by Renaud. Shortly afterwards, however, the timely arrival of Lambert's troops allowed Erispoe to counter-attack in force, defeating Renaud. Renaud himself was killed the day afterwards, during the pursuit. The Bretons may also have been assisted by the Viking warlord Håstein, who is said to have personally killed Renaud. However, other sources assert that Lambert killed Renaud and that the Viking force arrived shortly afterwards, looking for plunder.

== Aftermath ==
The Vikings sacked Nantes and killed its bishop. Lambert occupied the town, but was unable to hold it. Renaud's son Hervé was killed in battle against Lambert a year later. Recent studies suggest that another of Renaud's sons Ragenold became Count of Herbauges, then Maine and Marquis of Neustria.

Titles of nobility
Preceded by Ricwin	Count of Nantes; 841–843	Succeeded by Lambert II
