= List of Breton historians =

Most historians of Brittany are French historians, apart from Michael Jones. Many modern historians have sought to reinterpret the history of an eternally existent "Breton nation" to appeal to Breton nationalism.

== Notable historians ==
- Bertrand d'Argentré
- Pierre Daru
- Michel Denis
- Léon Fleuriot
- Gildas
- Kristian Hamon
- Michael Jones
- Arthur de La Borderie
- Pierre Le Baud
- Gwennole Le Menn
- Dom Lobineau
- Nennius
