= Battle of Blain =

843 battle

Coordinates: 47°29′N 1°45′W

Date	24 May 843
Location	Blain, Loire-Atlantique
Result	Breton victory

Belligerents
Duchy of Brittany	County of Nantes

Commanders and leaders
Erispoe, Lambert II of Nantes	Renaud d'Herbauges

The Battle of Blain, also called the Battle of Messac, was fought on 24 May 843 by the forces of Lambert II of Nantes and Erispoe, prince of Brittany, against Renaud, Frankish Count of Nantes. It arose from Breton resistance to Frankish power within Brittany and disputes over control of the County of Nantes. The defeat of the Franks led to a period of Breton expansionism.

== Background ==
Following the break-up of the Carolingian Empire, Nominoe, Duke of Brittany, rebelled against the authority of Charles the Bald and attempted to expand into Frankish territory. When Charles placed Renaud in command of the Frankish border zone as Count of Nantes, he incurred the enmity of Lambert II of Nantes, who believed that he was the rightful heir to the County. Lambert and Nominoe intended to join forces. While Nominoe prepared an army to attack Nantes, Renaud organised the defence of the city. However, when Renaud heard that Nominoe was incapacitated due to an illness he decided to strike first against the Bretons, who were now under the command of Nominoe's son Erispoe. Frankish forces advanced from Nantes to the river Vilaine, hoping to take the Bretons by surprise. Erispoe's troops had arrived at Messac and were in the process of crossing the Vilaine when Renaud launched his surprise attack. Erispoe's advance force was completely routed, and his main army dangerously weakened.

== Battle ==
Sources differ about what happened next, though all agree that the tables were turned on Renaud by the timely arrival of Erispoe's ally Lambert II. According to one version of events, Erispoe was saved at Messac itself by Lambert, who had gathered soldiers on the borders of the Anjou, and had advanced on the Vilaine to join his forces with Nominoe. He completely surprised Renaud, and made a great carnage. With both armies present, Renaud's troops were nearly surrounded and were destroyed.

However, the Chronicle of Nantes gives a slightly different version of events, asserting that Renaud, believing that he had crushed the Bretons at Messac, gathered his forces to return to Nantes. Arriving at Blain, he stopped to rest his troops. Meanwhile, Lambert had joined Erispoe, and with their combined armies they struck back at Renaud. The Frankish soldiers were lying on the grass near the edges of the river Isac, in complete abandonment, when suddenly Lambert's and Erispoe's armies attacked and destroyed them.

Whichever version is correct, Renaud himself was killed in the aftermath. A Viking force under Hastein may also have joined the Bretons, though other evidence suggests that they arrived later to look for plunder.

Lambert took control of Nantes, but seems to have been unable to hold it. The Vikings looted the city and murdered the bishop, Gohard. The Breton victory was followed by others, leading by 851 to the Treaty of Angers, in which the towns of Nantes and Rennes became possessions of Brittany and Erispoe was granted the title King of Brittany.
