= Erispoe =

Duke/King of Brittany from 851 to 857

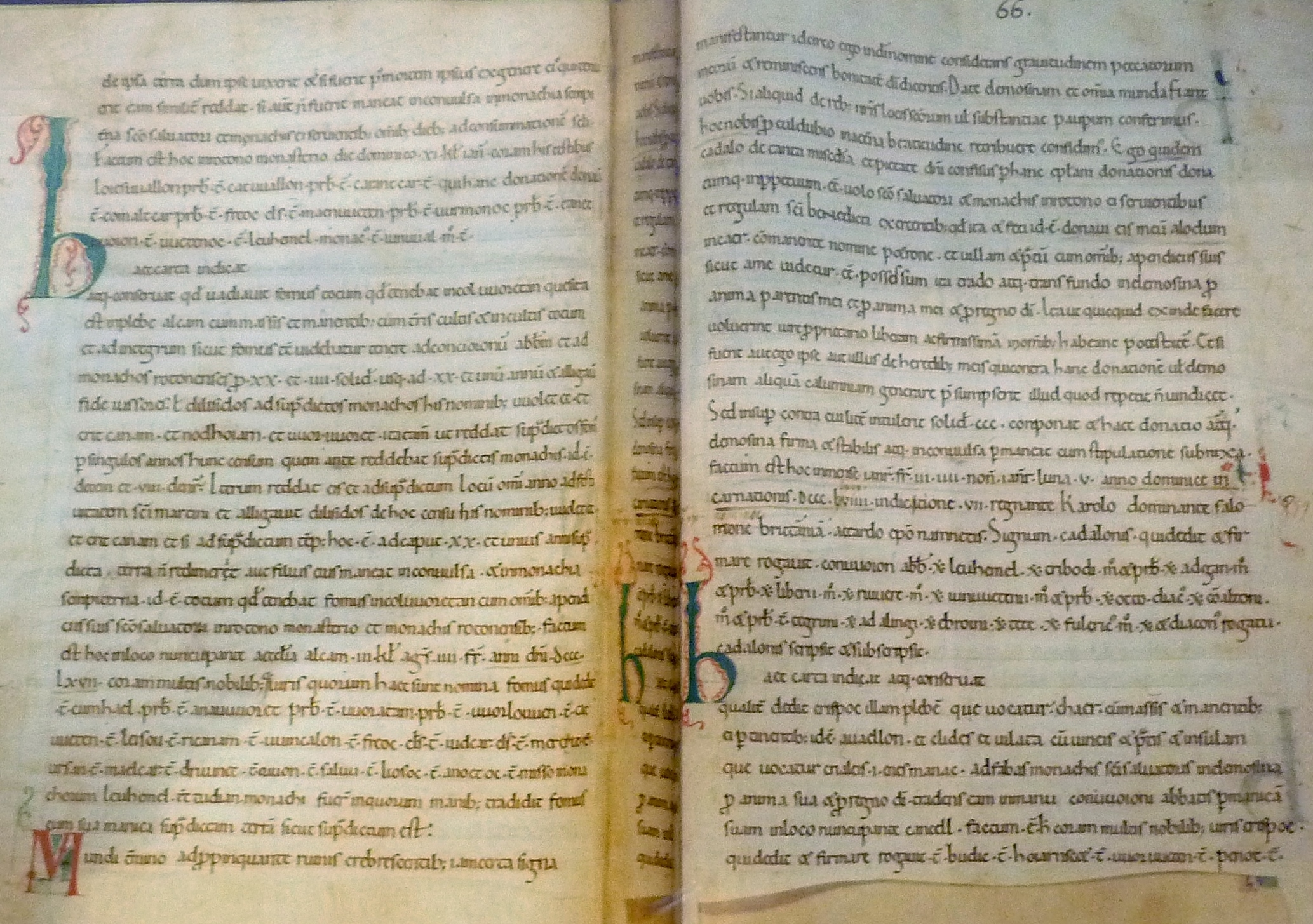
The pages of the Redon cartular in which the Île-aux-Moines is mentioned for the first time (copy). This charter preserves and indicates how Erispoë gave the parish called Chaer, with the outfits that depend on it and their settlers, namely Avaellon, Clides and Villata, with its vineyards and meadows, and the island called Crialeis, that is to say Enesmanac, as a fief to the monks of the abbey of Saint-Sauveur, as alms for his soul and for the kingdom of God.

Erispoe (French: Erispoë; Latin: Herispoius, Herispogius, Respogius; died 2 or 12 November 857) was Duke of Brittany from 851 to his death. After the death of his father Nominoe, he led a successful military campaign against the Franks, culminating in his victory at the Battle of Jengland. He is subsequently referred to as "King of Brittany".

Erispoe's recorded titles include provinciæ Brittaniæ princeps ("prince of the province of Brittany"), dux Brittonum ("duke of the Bretons"), and Rex tyrannicus Brittonum ("usurping king of the Bretons"). However, if Erispoe was usurping regality in Brittany at that time (857), it is not attested in other sources. It may imply continued Frankish resentment of the title. He is called rex Brittonum ("king of the Bretons") by Regino of Prüm (d. 915).

== War with the Franks ==
Erispoe was born to Nominoe's wife Argentaela, but the date of his birth is not known. He was involved in his father's campaigns to take control of the Frankish counties of Rennes and Nantes. In 843, in alliance with Lambert II of Nantes, Erispoe took command of the Breton army while his father was ill. Lambert had been displaced as ruler of Nantes by Charles the Bald, king of West Francia, who had installed Renaud d'Herbauges in his place. Ambushed by Count Renaud, Erispoe was badly defeated at the initial engagement at Messac. However, the Brittons quickly rallied their troops and took the complacent Franks by surprise shortly thereafter at the Battle of Blain, inflicting a serious defeat resulting in the death of Count Renaud.

Having regained his health, Nominoe took command once more. The victory at Blain having secured control of Nantes and Rennes, he raided into Frankish territory, defeating the Franks at the Battle of Ballon in 845. A truce followed, but after Charles regained control of Nantes, Nominoe and Erispoe renewed their offensive in 849. While on campaign, Nominoe died suddenly. Erispoe was proclaimed leader, but immediately after his father's death, his power was challenged by Charles the Bald, still his nominal suzerain. Charles crossed the river Vilaine with an army. Erispoe defeated Charles in the decisive Battle of Jengland on 22 August 851.

== Treaty of Angers ==
Erispoe met Charles in Angers (possibly in secret) in the days following the battle and concluded a peace treaty in return for being invested with the counties of Rennes and Nantes. South of the Loire, the Pays de Retz was detached from the County of Poitou and granted to him as well. Charles and Erispoe also created a baptismal alliance, whereby Charles stood as godfather at the baptism of Erispoe's infant son Conan, but whether in 851 or 856 is unknown. Finally, in 851 Charles gave Erispoe royal regalia (robes at least) and Erispoe in turn pledged himself to Charles with the giving of hands and an oath of fidelity. Erispoe subsequently overate at the banquet given in his honour.

According to the Annales Bertiniani, at Louviers in February 856 Erispoe's daughter (unnamed in the sources) was betrothed to Charles's young son, Louis the Stammerer, who was granted the ducatus Cenomannicus as subking of Neustria with Le Mans as his capital. With the consent of the Frankish magnates, Louis received the regnum Neustriae from his father:

Karlus rex cum Respogio Brittone paciscens, filiam eius filio suo Ludoico despondet, dato illi ducatu Cenomannico usque ad viam quae a Lotitia Parisiorum Cesaredunum Turonum ducit.
King Charles, making peace with Erispoe of Brittany, the daughter of whom was betrothed to his son Louis, gave the duchy of Maine as far as the road from Paris to Tours as duke.

Erispoe was at peace with Charles for the whole of his reign after Jengland and he governed as a typical Carolingian regional official might, with the added dignity of a consors regni (royal consort). Erispoe's use of a royal seal has led to the false belief that he was a king (rex), but in fact he probably received the right to use such a seal from Charles, who himself used an imperial seal.

== Later life ==
Erispoe was a benefactor of the abbey of Redon, as his father had been; his power base lay in the Vannetais and southeast Brittany (even more easterly than his father). In 853 the town of Nantes was plundered by the Vikings. Erispoe launched a war against them but it came to an end when they departed a few years later.

=== Death and succession ===
In November 857 he was assassinated at the altar of a church, which was then considered a place of asylum, by his cousin and successor Salomon, aided by an obscure Almarchus (Almarus). He was buried at Redon Abbey.

== Family ==
By his wife Marmohec (who predeceased him) he had at least two children, the aforementioned Conan and a girl, who eventually married Gurvand of Rennes.

== See also ==
- Dukes of Brittany family tree

== Notes ==
Regnal titles
Preceded by Nominoe	Duke of Brittany; 851–857	Succeeded by Salomon
