= Nominoe =

Duke of Brittany from 846 to 851

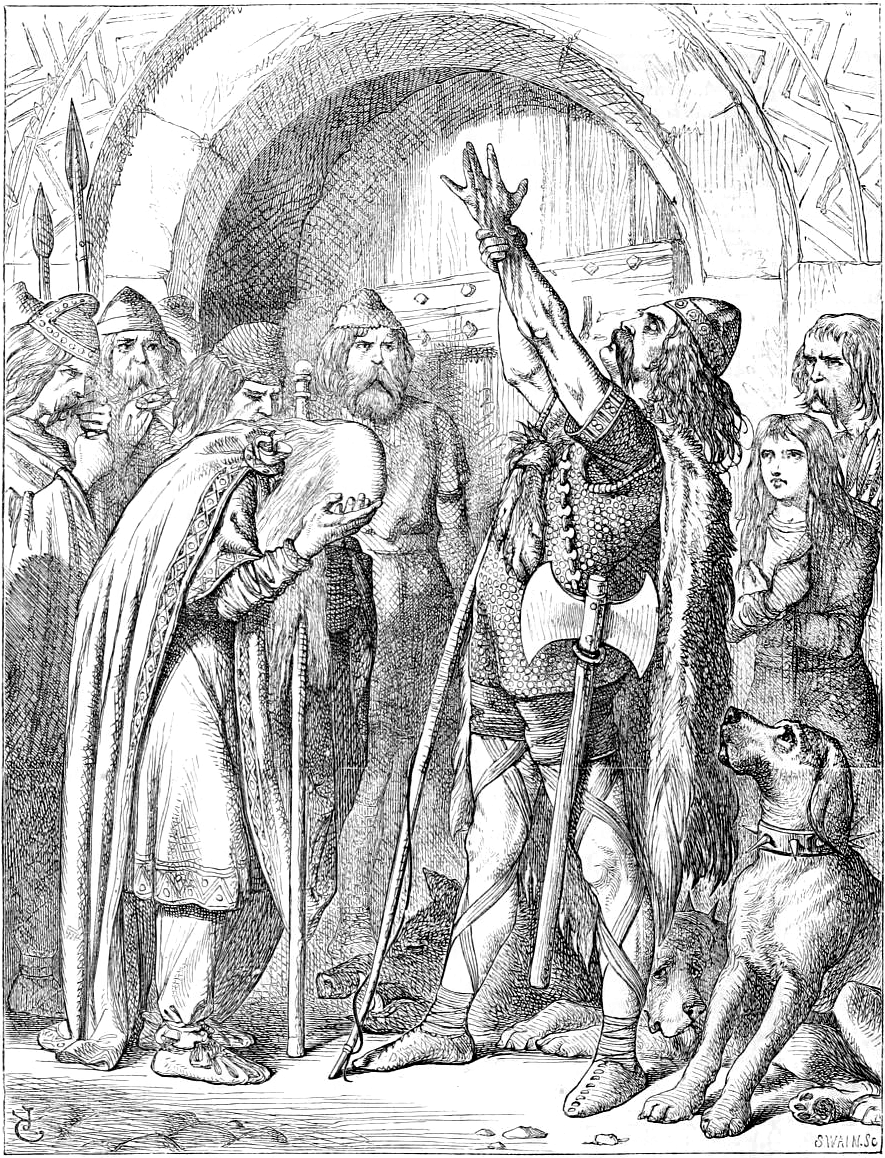
- Nominoe's Vow, a Victorian illustration to a ballad about Nominoe in Barzaz Breiz in which he vows vengeance on the Franks for killing a Breton emissary

Duke of Brittany
- Reign: 841–851
- Predecessor: Wihomarc
- Successor: Erispoe
- Born: c 800 Rennes, France
- Died: 7 March 851 (aged ~50–51) Vendôme, France
- Burial: Redon Abbey, Ille-et-Vilaine 47.650°N 2.084°W
- Spouse: Von Argenthal
- Issue: Erispoe; Gurvand de Bretagne

Nominoe or Nomenoe (French: Nominoë; Breton: Nevenoe; b. c 800, d. 7 March 851) was the first Duke of Brittany from 846 to his death. He is the Breton pater patriae and to Breton nationalists he is known as Tad ar Vro ("father of the country").

== Origins ==
He was the second son of Count Erispoe or Erispoë of Poher, King of the Browaroch (775–812), and younger brother of Count Riwallon or Rivallon III of Poher (?–857).

== Rise and titulature under Louis the Pious ==
After a general rebellion which had enveloped the entire Carolingian Empire was put down, a general assembly was held at Ingelheim in May 831. It was probably there that the emperor Louis the Pious appointed Nominoe, a Breton, to rule the Bretons (which corresponded to "almost all" of Brittany). Regino of Prüm in his famous Chronicon writes, inaccurately for the year 837, that:

Murmanus rex Brittonum moritur et Numenoio apud Ingelheim ab imperator ducatus ipsius gentis traditur.
Morman, king of the Bretons, died and Numenoi [Nominoe] was created duke of that same people by the emperor at Ingelheim.

Nominoe was a staunch ally of Louis the Pious until the emperor's death in 840. He supported Louis in the several civil wars of the 830s and he supported the monastery of Redon Abbey, even ordering the monks to pray for Louis in light of the emperor's "strife". Nominoe's power base was in the Vannetais and two charters refer to him as Count of Vannes, though it is unknown when that title was held, be it as early as 819 or as late as 834. Nominoe may not have possessed any land outside Vannes and his ability to gather revenue in Breton-speaking territories was probably no greater than any other aristocrat of those regions. His chief source of income after he broke with his overlord was plunder from raids into Frankish territory and from the despoliation of churches. He did have the political authority to exact payment (wergild) in the form of land from a man who had murdered his follower Catworet.

The title Duke of Brittany is primarily a chronicler's invention of the tenth century. Nominoe never held a title from the emperor, who refers to him in charters as merely fidelis, "faithful one", or as missus imperatoris, "imperial emissary", which was probably the title he was granted at Ingelheim. In Breton charters, Nominoe was known inconsistently by several titles from February 833 until his death:

- Nominoe magistro in Britanniam ("Nominoe, master in Brittany")
- Nominoe possidente Brittanniam ("Nominoe, possessing Brittany")
- gubernante Nominoe totam Brittanniam ("Nominoe, governing all Brittany")
- Nominoe principe in Brittannia ("Nominoe, prince in Brittany")
- regnante Nominoe in Brittannia ("Nominoe, reigning in Brittany")
- Nominoe duce in Britannia ("Nominoe, duke in Brittany")
- Nomenoius dux ("duke Nominoe")
- Nominoius princeps ("prince Nominoe")
- Nomenogius Britto ("Breton Nominoe")

== Loyalty and falling out with Charles the Bald ==
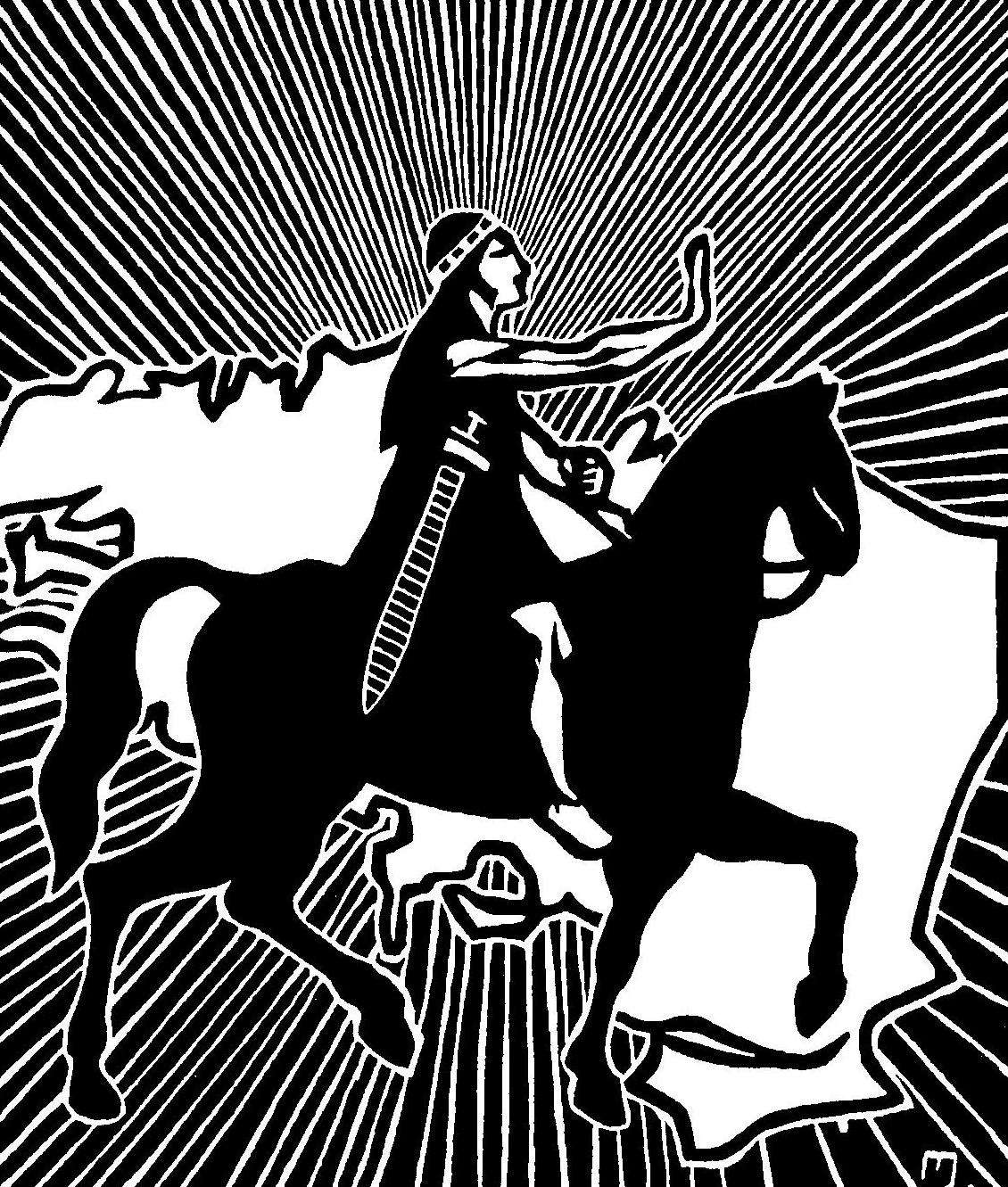
Nominoe Triumphant: Tad ar Vro (Jeanne Malivel, 1922), Breton nationalist engraving of Nominoe.

The relations between Nominoe and Charles the Bald, Louis's successor after 840, were initially amicable. In the midst of a revolt of his men in Neustria, Charles sent from Le Mans to see if Nominoe would submit to him in the spring of 841 and Nominoe agreed to do so. It is clear from the wording of the account of this event in Nithard that Nominoe was too powerful to be compelled to submit; later in 841 he rebuffed the overtures of the new emperor, Lothair I, who claimed Neustria. Nominoe remained loyal to Charles throughout the next year, even making a donation "in alms for the king" to the abbey of Redon on 25 January 842. Breton soldiers, as well as Gascons, certainly took part in the military show of the Oaths of Strasbourg.

In the summer of 843, Lothair or perhaps his supporter Lambert II of Nantes succeeded in persuading Nominoe to abandon Charles and go over to the emperor. Nominoe was thereafter a constant enemy of Charles and his authority in Neustria, often acting in concert with Lothair, Lambert, and Pepin II of Aquitaine. Breton troops fought under Lambert in Neustria and when, in June 844, Charles was besieging Toulouse, Nominoe raided into Maine and plundered the territory. In November 843, Charles had marched as far as Rennes to compel Breton submission, but to no effect.

At the synod of Yutz in October 844, presided over by Charles' uncle Drogo of Metz, the bishops sent orders to Nominoe, Lambert, and Pepin commanding them to renew their fealty to Charles or be prepared to accept military consequences. Lambert and Pepin complied, but Nominoe ignored the Frankish bishops. However, some Bretons had connived against him with Charles and the king tried to enter Brittany in support of the defectors, but without success: he was defeated at the Battle of Ballon just north of Redon across the Vilaine on 22 November 845. It is probable that in the Vannetais Nominoe's authority had been weakened after his split with Charles in 843 and Lupus of Ferrières reports "unrest" in Brittany during this period.

In 844 and 847 according to the Annales Bertiniani, Nominoe made war on the Vikings.

== Renewed loyalty and second rebellion ==
In Summer 846, Charles marched on Brittany and again took no military action, instead coming to peace with Nominoe and exchanging oaths. The details of the peace arrangements are unknown, but Prudentius of Troyes uses the title "duke" (dux) for the first time in this context and this may indicate that Nominoe was created Duke of the Bretons in return for recognising Charles' lordship. As another part of the agreement, Nominoe had Charles remove Lambert from Nantes and put him in power in Sens further away.

By Christmas time, Nominoe's Bretons were raiding Neustria, this time near Bayeux, again. This was probably instigated by Lothair, for he, Charles, and their brother Louis the German met at Meerssen in February 847 and agreed to send orders to Nominoe and Pepin II to desist from making war on Charles. Nominoe, probably being paid by Lothair, did not in fact desist; neither did Pepin. In two campaigns in the spring and then fall of 849, Charles was in Aquitaine and Nominoe took the opportunity to raid Neustria. Charles reestablished Lambert in Nantes after Nominoe invaded Anjou.

In 850, Lambert (and his brother Warnar) had renewed their friendship with Nominoe and together were raiding Maine "with unspeakable fury" according to the Chronicon Fontanellense. In August, Charles marched on Rennes, again avoided fighting, and installed garrisons there and at Nantes. Immediately after he left, Lambert and Nominoe defeated the garrisons and captured the new Count of Nantes, Amalric. On 7 March 851, Nominoe died near Vendôme while ravaging the Nantais and Anjou; he was buried at Redon Abbey. By his wife Argentaela, Nominoe left a son named Erispoe, who succeeded him. Nominoe was thus the founder of a political tradition in Brittany which had not thitherto existed; though his charters did not mimic Carolingian ones, his successors would imitate the legitimising Carolingian language in theirs.

== Deposition of the bishops ==
In 849 at a place called Coitlouh, Nominoe held a synod whereat he deposed the five Breton bishops of Alet, Saint-Pol, Vannes, Quimper, and Dol. The charges he levelled against them are unknown. Pope Leo IV sent a letter to Nominoe and the bishops (whether before or after the deposition is unknown) informing him that the depositions could only be enacted by a panel of twelve bishops with seventy-two witnesses. The later popes Benedict II and Nicholas I believed that Nominoe had forced the bishops to admit to crimes they had not committed and that their depositions were thus invalid. A Frankish synod of 850 held at either Angers or Tours accused Nominoe of simony by unlawfully removing bishops and replacing them with mercenarii (mercenaries of his own). These mercenarii were excommunicated, as indicated by an epistle of the synod of Savonnières in 859 sent to what remained of the Breton church in communion with the Archdiocese of Tours. Nominoe sacked Rennes and Nantes, replacing the new Frankish bishop of the latter with his own nominee.

Susannus was deposed in Vannes and replaced by Courantgen. Salocon was deposed in Dol, but his replacement is unknown. At Quimper, Felix was replaced by Anaweten and at Saint-Pol, Clutwoion replaced Garnobrius. The two bishops of Alet, first Rethwalatr and then Mahen are very obscure figures. The bishop of Nantes whom Nominoe succeeded in removing for about a year was Actard. His replacement was the obscure Gislard. In the end the synod of Coitlouh and the bringing of the bishoprics of Rennes and Nantes into the Breton fold meant that the church of Brittany was an actively independent ecclesiastic polity from its nominal metropolitan, the Metropolitan of Tours.

== Succession ==
At his death Nominoe was succeeded by his son Erispoe. Nominoe was buried at Redon Abbey.

== See also ==
- Dukes of Brittany family tree
- Breton nationalism

== Notes ==
Regnal titles
Preceded by Wihomarc	Duke of Brittany; 846–851	Succeeded by Erispoe
