= Kingdom of Brittany =

Vassal state of the Frankish Empire

Kingdom of Brittany Rouantelezh Breizh (Breton) Royaume de Bretagne (French)
- 851–939
- The growth of the Kingdom of Brittany 845–67
- Common languages: Breton, Gallo, Latin, French, Norman, Poitevin
- Religion: Catholicism
- Monarch
  - 851–857: Erispoe (first)
  - 938–939: Allan II (last)
- History
  - Battle of Jengland: 22 August 851
  - Battle of Trans-la-Forêt: 1 August 939
Preceded by
Cornouaille
Domnonée
Broërec
Marches of Neustria
Succeeded by
Duchy of Brittany
Viking Upper Brittany
Duchy of Normandy
Frank Neustria

The Kingdom of Brittany (Breton: Rouantelezh Breizh) was a short-lived vassal state of the Frankish Empire that emerged during the Norse invasions. Its history begins in 851 with Erispoe's claim to kingship. In 856, Erispoe was murdered and succeeded by his cousin Salomon.

The kingdom fell into a period of turmoil caused by Norse invasions and a succession dispute between Salomon's murderers: Gurvand and Pascweten. Pascweten's brother, Alan, called the Great, was the third and last to be recognized as King of Brittany. After his death, Brittany fell under Norse occupation.

When Alan Twistedbeard, Alan the Great's grandson, reconquered Brittany in 939, Brittany became a sovereign duchy until its union with France in 1532.

== History ==
=== Background ===
In 383, Magnus Maximus was proclaimed emperor by his soldiers in Britain. He promptly invaded Gaul and deposed Emperor Gratian. During the invasion, he instructed some of his soldiers to occupy the western part of the Armorican peninsula and expel soldiers loyal to Gratian. The House of Ingelger confirm this event in their origin story.

At the end of the Antiquity period, additional Celtic Britons, fleeing the Anglo-Saxon settlement of Britain (5th-7th centuries), settled in the same region. At some stage, it was renamed Brittany ("little Britain").

As a result of these settlements, Celtic culture was revived in Gallo-Roman Armorica and independent petty kingdoms arose in this region, namely Cornouaille, Domnonée and Broërec.

=== Imperial emissary ===
From 801 to 837, the adjacent Frankish Empire made several unsuccessful attempts to subdue the Breton tribes. In order to bring Brittany into the Empire's sphere of influence, Louis the Pious appointed Nominoe, a noble Briton, head of the region. Titled missus imperatoris ("Imperial emissary") by the Emperor, he was in charge of the administration of the region on the latter's behalf.

=== Kingdom of Brittany ===
Viking invasions in the 9th and 10th centuries in Brittany. The location of the supposed or attested Viking camps is not validated by any reliable document, nor any archaeological proof of their presence on the site, except perhaps at Péran and more certainly at Landévennec.

==== Battle of Ballon ====
Following the death of Louis the Pious and taking advantage of the Norman invasions destabilizing the Frankish Empire, Nominoe defeated Frankish troops at the Battle of Ballon (845). The peace treaty that followed allowed Nominoe to increase his autonomy from Charles the Bald, a son of Louis the Pious. In 850, the Bretons briefly occupied the Frankish Breton March, but following Nominoe's untimely death they retreated to their historical lands.

==== Battle of Jengland and the first Breton king ====
Seeking revenge, Charles the Bald invaded Brittany with an army drawn from both the western and eastern parts of the Frankish empire. Erispoe, Nominoe's son and successor, intercepted Charles at the Battle of Jengland (851). At the Treaty of Angers signed the same year, the Pays de Retz entered Erispoe's realm. As the Bretons decisively defeated the Franks, Brittany became effectively independent of the Frankish Empire, making Erispoe the first king of Brittany. In 856, the Kingdom of Brittany and the Frankish Empire allied themselves to counter the Norman invasions. But Erispoe was murdered the same year by his cousin Salomon who took the throne of Brittany and allied himself with the Normans to capture the Frankish city of Le Mans.

==== The second Breton king ====
Charles the Bald bought peace with the Bretons by giving away the provinces of Cotentin (863) and Maine (867). In 874, Salomon was murdered in a conspiracy involving Pascweten and Gurvand, but a civil war ensued between the latter pair. Both claimants died in 876, but war continued between their respective successors Alan (Pascweten's brother) and Judicael (Gurvand's son).

==== The third Breton king ====
In a temporary truce, Alan and Judicael allied themselves to counter Norman attacks. In one of those attacks in Questembert in 888, Judicael died and Alan became king of Brittany as Alan I.

==== End of the kingdom ====
Alan died in 907 and was succeeded, after a disputed succession, by Gourmaëlon who did not claim the title of king. Little is known about his reign because Norse raids increased dramatically, destabilizing the region further. It was probably during one of these attacks that Gourmaëlon died in 913.

==== The Norse occupation ====
From 919, Brittany was completely occupied by the Norsemen, monasteries and cities were looted and many Bretons fled to neighbouring countries.

==== The Breton reconquer ====
In 935, Alan Twistedbeard (Alan I's grandson), who had fled back to England after a failed insurrection against the Norsemen a few years earlier, disembarked once more on the shores of Brittany in order to reconquer his domain. By 937, he had recovered most of Brittany and the Norsemen retreated to their stronghold of Trans-la-Forêt. In 939, a combined army of Frankish and Breton soldiers attacked the fortress and eliminated the Norse threat in Brittany.

==== Fealty to the Franks ====
With his domain ruined by decades of occupation and war, Alan Twistedbeard was not in a position to restore the kingship of Brittany and paid tribute as duke of Brittany to king Louis IV of France in 942.

== Petty and regional kings ==
- Judicael (c. 590–657) - Breton high king, king of Domnonée; united the Breton kingdoms of Domnonée and Broërec; recognized Dagobert I and Eligius
- Morman (reigned 814–818)- first ruler named King of Brittany by the Breton nobles upon the death of Charlemagne in 814, whom he had served as a vassal
- Period of Frankish rule under Louis the Pious (819–822) - Morman rebelled against Frankish rule but was defeated by Louis the Pious. During this period Brittany was also threatened by the Breton March.
- Wihomarc (reigned 822–825) - led a successful rebellion against Frankish rule to re-establish Breton rule; killed by Lambert I, Count of Nantes of the Breton March
- Nominoe (or Nevenoe) (ruled 841–851), a count of Vannes, first duke of Brittany
  - by tradition, Father of the Country;
  - a missus dominicus of the Emperor Louis the Pious;
- Erispoe (ruled 851–857), a Count of Vannes, son of Nominoe; ruled as duke, then as king
  - assassinated at a church altar, at the time a place of asylum, by Salomon, his cousin
  - his daughter married Gurvand
- Salomon (or Salaun) (reigned 857–874), a count of Rennes and a count of Nantes
  - led a revolt against Erispoe;
  - ruled as duke, then as king based upon the coronet and purple robes bestowed upon him by the emperor; the last ruler of unified Brittany until Alan I;
  - attempted to have the Pope award the pallium to the Bishopric of Dol in an effort to obtain its independence from the Metropolitan of Tours;
  - assassinated in a revolt led in part by Pascweten, Count of Vannes, his son-in-law and Gurvand, the son-in-law of Erispoe;
  - canonized a saint and raised to the level of martyr
- Period of divided rule during a civil war and the first Viking invasion (874–888)
  - Southern Brittany
    - Pascweten (or Paskweten) (reigned 874–877), a count of Vannes, ruled southern Brittany contemporaneously with Gurvand;
    - Alan the Great (reigned 877–888) - succeeded his brother Pascweten; ruled southern Brittany contemporaneously with Judicael; see Alan I
  - Northern Brittany
    - Gurvand (reigned 874–877), ruled northern Brittany contemporaneously with Pascweten;
    - Judicael (reigned 877–888), succeeded Gurvand, ruled northern Brittany contemporaneously with Alan the Great; see Alan I
- Alan I, or Alan the Great,
  - (reigned 877–888) succeeded Pascweten, and reigned from 877 to 888 with Judicael, then,
  - (reigned 888–907) ruled alone as a duke upon Judicaël's death,
  - granted the title of king or 'rex Brittaniæ' by the Emperor Charles the Fat;
  - the last king of Brittany
- The second Viking invasion and occupation (907–937)
  - Alan I's son Mathuedoi, Count of Poher, and his son (who would become Alan II) fled Brittany and lived in exile with the king of England. Mathuedoi was a king in exile but never crowned.
