= Alan of Brittany =

Alan of Brittany may refer to:

- Alan I, King of Brittany (ruled 876–907), nicknamed the Great
- Alan II, Duke of Brittany (ruled 938–952), nicknamed Wrybeard
- Alan, Count of Nantes (988–90), may also have been duke of Brittany
- Alan III, Duke of Brittany (ruled 1008–1040)
- Alan IV, Duke of Brittany (ruled 1084–1119), nicknamed Fergant
