= Alan I of Brittany =

King of Brittany

Alan I (French: Alain; died 907), called the Great, was the Count of Vannes and Duke of Brittany (dux Brittonium) from 876 until his death. He was probably also the only King of Brittany (rex Brittaniæ) to hold that title by a grant of the Emperor.

== Expulsion of Vikings ==
Alan was the second son of Count Ridoredh of Vannes. He succeeded his brother Pascweten in Vannes when the latter died, probably in the middle of 876, and contended for leadership of Brittany with Judicael of Poher. Alan represented the power bloc of southeastern Brittany while Judicael represented western Breton interests. Eventually he and Judicael made peace in order to fight the Vikings. Judicael died in the Battle of Questembert in 888 or 889, after which Alan gained sole leadership of Brittany. In 890, Alan defeated the Vikings at Saint-Lô, chasing them into a river where many drowned.

== King of Brittany ==
After the death of Judicael, Alan ruled all of Brittany as it had been during the time of Salomon. He ruled not only the Breton territories of Léon, Domnonée, Cornouaille, and the Vannetais, but also the Frankish counties of Rennes, Nantes, Coutances, and Avranches, as well as the western parts of Poitou (the so-called pays de Retz) and Anjou. In the east his rule extended as far as the river Vire. He was the first Breton ruler to rule this entire territory without great opposition within the west and the last to rule the whole bloc of Franco-Celtic countries. His strongest opponent was Fulk I of Anjou, who disputed control of the Nantais with him, though Alan seems to have had the upper hand in his lifetime. His power base remained in the southeast and he was powerful and wealthy in land in around Vannes and Nantes.

According to the Anglo-Saxon Chronicle, after the death of Carloman II in 884, Charles the Fat succeeded to all of West Francia save Brittany, thus making Brittany an independent kingdom; but this does not seem to have been true. A charter datable to between 897 and 900 makes reference to the soul of Karolus on whose behalf Alan had ordered prayers to be said in the monastery of Redon. This was probably Charles the Fat, who, as emperor, probably granted Alan the right to be titled rex. As emperor he would have had that prerogative and he is known to have had contacts with Nantes in 886, making it not improbable that he came into communication with Alan. Charles also made a concerted effort to rule effectively in the entirety of his empire and to make former enemies, with dubious ties to the empire, like the Viking Godfrid, men of standing in return for their loyalty. Throughout his reign, Alan used Carolingian symbols of regalia and Carolingian forms in his charters. Alan augmented his power during the weak reigns of Odo and Charles III.

== Death and succession ==
Alan I died in 907. The succession was disputed and Count Gourmaëlon of Cornouaille seized the throne. Brittany was soon overrun by Vikings, who defeated and slew Gourmaëlon in battle in 913/914 and held the region until 936 when Alan I's grandson Alan II returned to Brittany from exile in Æthelstan's England, vanquished the Vikings, and succeeded in reestablishing Christian rule. However, Brittany's geographic territory was never as extended as in Alan I's time and no future Breton rulers were called kings until the Breton Ducal crown was merged with the French crown in the 16th century (q.v. List of rulers of Brittany).

== Reputed connection with House of Rennes ==
According to an 11th-century genealogy composed for the Count of Anjou, Alan I's son, Pascweten the Younger, was the father of Judicael Berengar, whose son was Conan I of Rennes, founder of the House of Rennes.

== Children ==
By his wife Oreguen, Alan had the following children:

- Pascweten (died c. 903), married Gerberga. An 11th-century collection of Angevin genealogies describes him as the father of Judicael Berengar.
- Guerec
- Budic
- Rudalt, Count of Vannes, fled the Viking invasion c. 919
- Daughter, name unknown, who married Mathuedoï I, Count of Poher, and was the mother of Alan II
- Daughter, name unknown, who married Tangui, Count of Vannes, died before 913

== See also ==
- Dukes of Brittany family tree

== Sources ==
- Smith, Julia M. H. Province and Empire: Brittany and the Carolingians. Cambridge University Press: 1992.

Regnal titles
Preceded by Pascweten or Wrhwant	King of Brittany disputed with Judicael until 888 or 889; 876–907	Succeeded by Gourmaëlon
Preceded by Pasquitan	Count of Vannes ? - 907	Succeeded by Rudalt
