= 874 =

Calendar year

874 in various calendars
- Gregorian calendar: 874; DCCCLXXIV
- Ab urbe condita: 1627
- Armenian calendar: 323; ԹՎ ՅԻԳ
- Assyrian calendar: 5624
- Balinese saka calendar: 795–796
- Bengali calendar: 280–281
- Berber calendar: 1824
- Buddhist calendar: 1418
- Burmese calendar: 236
- Byzantine calendar: 6382–6383
- Chinese calendar: 癸巳年 (Water Snake); 3571 or 3364 — to — 甲午年 (Wood Horse); 3572 or 3365
- Coptic calendar: 590–591
- Discordian calendar: 2040
- Ethiopian calendar: 866–867
- Hebrew calendar: 4634–4635
- Hindu calendars
- Vikram Samvat: 930–931
- Shaka Samvat: 795–796
- Kali Yuga: 3974–3975
- Holocene calendar: 10874
- Iranian calendar: 252–253
- Islamic calendar: 260–261
- Japanese calendar: Jōgan 16 (貞観１６年)
- Javanese calendar: 772–773
- Julian calendar: 874; DCCCLXXIV
- Korean calendar: 3207
- Minguo calendar: 1038 before ROC 民前1038年
- Nanakshahi calendar: −594
- Seleucid era: 1185/1186 AG
- Thai solar calendar: 1416–1417
- Tibetan calendar: ཆུ་མོ་སྦྲུལ་ལོ་ (female Water-Snake); 1000 or 619 or −153 — to — ཤིང་ཕོ་རྟ་ལོ་ (male Wood-Horse); 1001 or 620 or −152

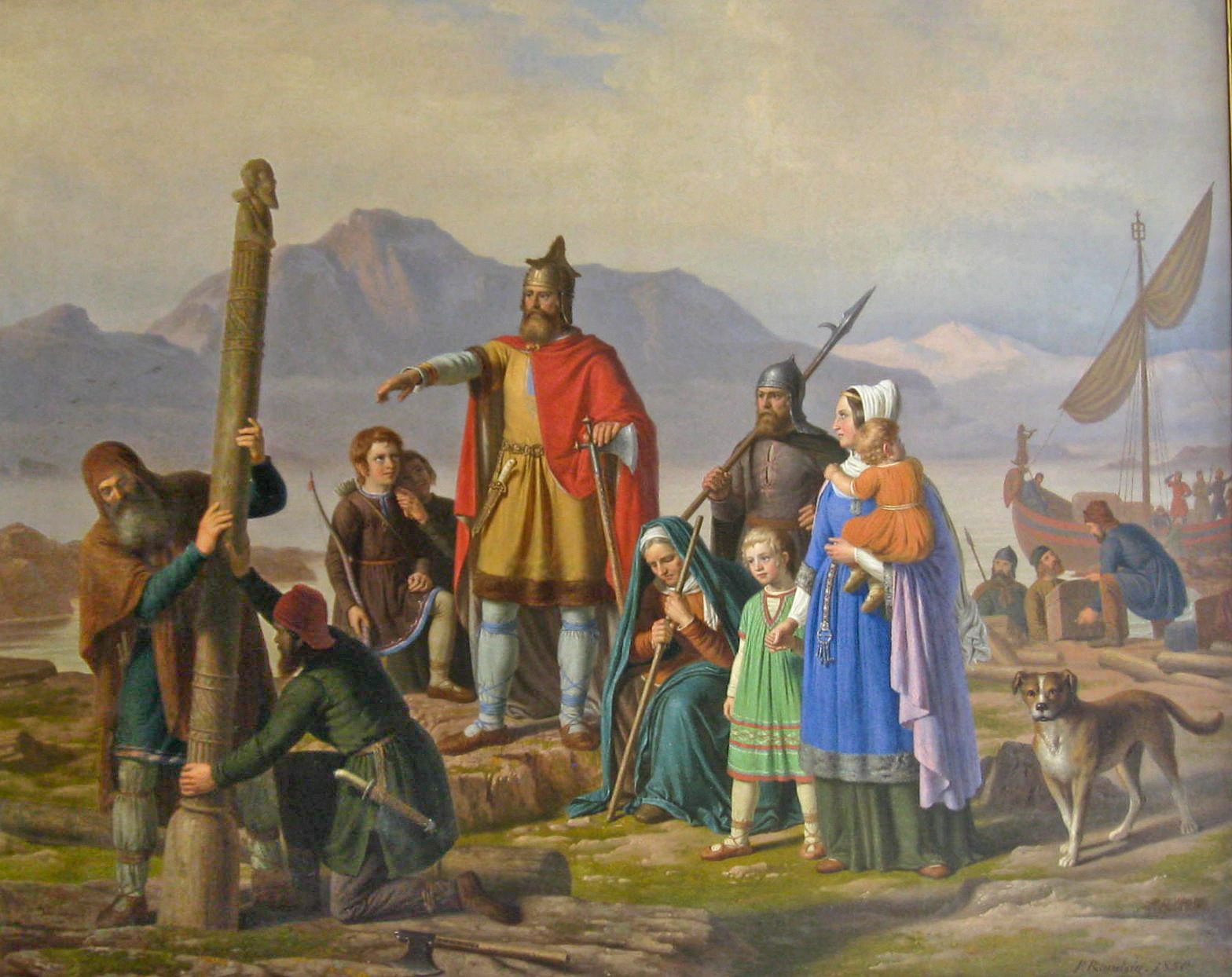
Ingólfr Arnarson arrives in Iceland (1850)

Year 874 (DCCCLXXIV) was a common year starting on Friday of the Julian calendar.

== Events ==
=== By place ===
==== Europe ====
- Salomon, duke ('king') of Brittany, is murdered by a faction which includes his son-in-law Pascweten and Gurvand, son-in-law of late ruler Erispoe. After Salomon's death they divide the country, and Pascweten and Gurvand co-rule Brittany.
- Svatopluk I, ruler (knyaz) of Great Moravia, concludes a peace treaty at Forchheim (Northern Bavaria). He is able to expand his territories outside the Frankish sphere, and subjugates the Vistulans.
- Ingólfr Arnarson arrives from Norway, as the first permanent Viking settler in Iceland. He builds his homestead and founds Reykjavík. The settlement of Iceland begins (approximate date).

==== Britain ====
- The Danish Vikings (from their base at Repton) drive King Burgred of Mercia into exile, and sack Tamworth. They conquer his kingdom and install his political opponent, Ceolwulf II, as sub-king.
- Autumn – The Great Heathen Army splits into two bands; Halfdan returns with his forces to Northumbria, along with his brother Ubba, where he establishes a new base on the River Tyne.
- Amlaíb Conung, the first Norse 'king' of Dublin, is killed in Scotland, during a campaign against his rival Constantin I (approximate date).
- November – Frost begins in Scotland, and lasts until April 875.

==== China ====
- Huang Chao, a salt privateer, joins forces with Wang Xianzhi to raise a rebel army at Changyuan (modern Xinxiang). The uprising further weakens the Tang dynasty, which is already weakened by natural disasters such as severe droughts and floods.

=== By topic ===
==== Religion ====
- March 13 – The remains of Saint Nikephorus I are interred in the Church of the Holy Apostles, in Constantinople.
- The monastery of Sevanavank, located on the shore of Lake Sevan (Armenia), is founded.
- Muhammad al-Mahdi, the child of the eleventh Shi'i Twelver Imam Hasan al-Askari, begins his Imamate. His first period of occultation, known as the Minor Occultation, also begins (ends 941 CE).

== Births ==
- May 10 – Meng Zhixiang, general of Later Tang (d. 934)
- Abu al-Hasan al-Ash'ari, Muslim scholar (d. 936)
- Edward the Elder, king of Wessex (approximate date)
- Constantine II, king of Scotland (approximate date)
- Liu Yin, governor (jiedushi) of Southern Han (d. 911)
- Lothar II, Frankish nobleman (d. 929)
- Ota, Frankish queen and Holy Roman Empress (approximate date)
- Wang Shifan, Chinese warlord (d. 908)

== Deaths ==
- January 4 – Hasan al-Askari, 11th Shia Imam (b. 846)
- August 15 – Altfrid, bishop of Hildesheim
- December 16 – Ado, archbishop of Vienne
- Amlaíb Conung, Viking leader (approximate date)
- Bayazid Bastami, Persian Sufi (approximate date)
- Han Yunzhong, general of the Tang dynasty (b. 814)
- Liu Zhan, chancellor of the Tang dynasty
- Lu Yan, chancellor of the Tang dynasty (b. 829)
- Pei Tan, chancellor of the Tang dynasty
- Salomon, duke ('king') of Brittany
- Unruoch III, margrave of Friuli
