= Judicaël of Nantes =

Judicaël of Nantes (c. 979–1004) was Count of Nantes from 992 to his death in 1004.

== Life ==
Judicaël was the illegitimate son of Hoël I, Duke of Brittany. He was brought up by his grandmother Judith and "Viscount" Haimon or Aymon, his father's maternal half-brother.

Judicaël was elected Bishop of Nantes in a non-canonical way after the death of his uncle, Guerech, the "Count Bishop". Hugh (Hugo), "character of wise and austere life" according to Albertus Magnus, who had been ruling de facto over the spiritual part of the Church of Nantes since 981, obtained in 990 the title of Bishop, whose duties he was already carrying out.

With the support of Fulk III, Count of Anjou, Judicaël regained the County of Nantes after the death of Conan I, Duke of Brittany at the second Battle of Conquereuil. Because of his young age, the Count of Anjou put him under the guardianship of his vassal, Viscount Aimery III of Thouars, who was titled Count of Nantes from 992 to 994.

In 994, Judicaël was defeated by the new Count of Rennes, Geoffrey, and he had to do homage to him. He died prematurely in 1004. According to the Chronicle of Nantes, he was treacherously murdered while going from Nantes to his suzerain's Court in Rennes.

== Issue ==
Judicaël and his wife Melisende had two children:

- Budic of Nantes who succeeded him as Count of Nantes
- Judith of Nantes who married Alain Canhiart, Count of Cornouaille, around 1026. She succeeded her nephew Matthew as Countess of Nantes.

== Sources ==
- Chronique de Nantes Présentée et annotée par René Merlet. Available on Gallica:
- André Chédeville and Noël-Yves Tonnerre La Bretagne féodale XIe-XIIIe siècle. Ouest-France Université Rennes (1987).
