= Judith of Nantes =

Judith of Nantes (1000 – 27 February 1063) was titular Countess of Nantes from 1051 to her death in 1063.

== Life ==
Judith was the daughter of Judicaël of Nantes and the sister of Budic of Nantes. She married Alain Canhiart, Count of Cornouaille, around 1026.

After the death of Judith's nephew Matthew I of Nantes, the only son of Budic of Nantes, Judith's husband Alain Canhiart managed to seize the County of Nantes in the name of their son Hoël, in spite of Duke Conan II's claims.

In 1054, Conan vainly tried to seize Nantes and had to accept defeat. Hoël ruled the County of Nantes in his mother's name from this date. He first concluded his reconciliation with Conan II by marrying his sister Hawise before 1058. In 1059, he imposed his younger brother Guerech as Bishop of Nantes to replace Airard, a reformative cleric and Abbot of Saint Paul Outside the Walls, who had been chased by the inhabitants of Nantes as early as 1051.

Judith died on 27 February 1063.

== Issue ==
Judith married Alain Canhiart, Count of Cornouaille, in 1026. They had:

- Hoël, Count of Nantes, Cornouaille, and Duke of Brittany jure uxoris
- Guerech (Quiriac) (1030 - 1078), elected Bishop of Nantes in 1059, consecrated 7 January 1061
- Budic, died 1091
- Hodiern, Abbess of Locmaria de Quimper
- Benoît, Abbot of the Abbey of Sainte-Croix de Quimperlé in 1066, elected Bishop of Nantes in 1079, consecrated in 1081, retired in 1114 and murdered in 1115
- Orguen (Agnes), wife of Odo I of Penthièvre.
- Daughter, married as her 2nd husband Norman Seigneur de Montrebel, recorded in The "Historia sancti Florentii Salmurensis" as a sister of Hoël.

== Sources ==
- André Chédeville and Noël-Yves Tonnerre La Bretagne féodale XIe-XIIIe siècle. Ouest-France Université Rennes (1987).
- Dunbabin, Jean (1985). France in the Making, 843-1180. Oxford University Press.
