= Avranchin =

Area in Normandy, France

Coordinates: 48.69°N 1.36°W

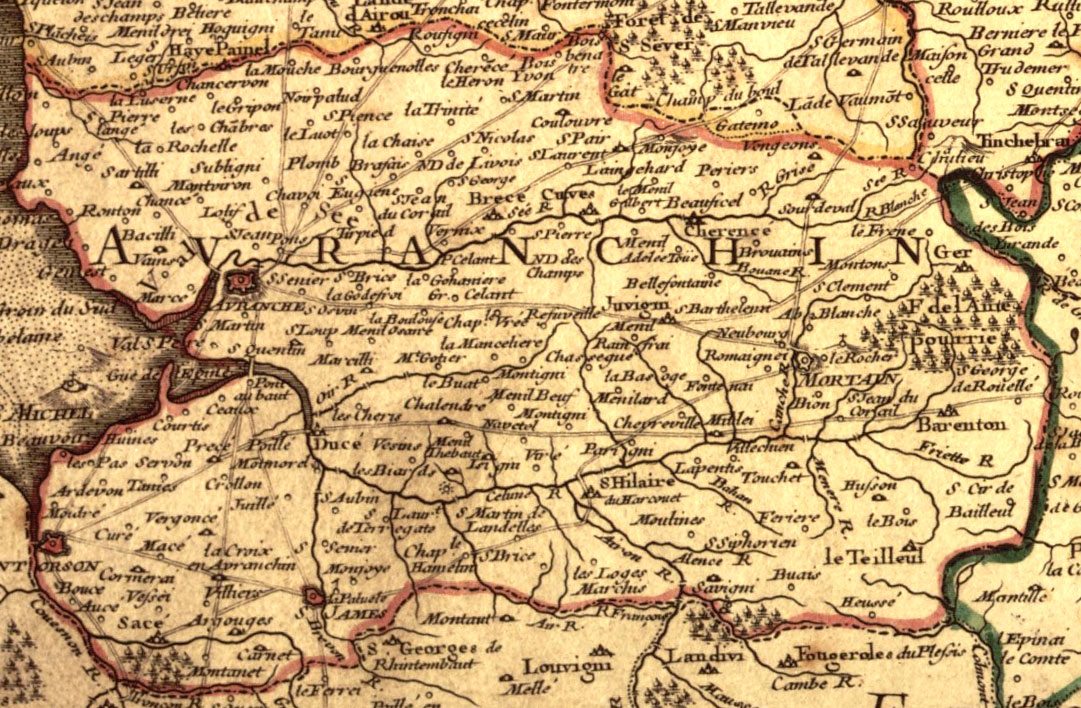
A map of Avranchin from 1716

Avranchin (French pronunciation: [avʁɑ̃ʃɛ̃]) is an area in Normandy, France corresponding to the territory of the Abrincatui, a tribe of Celts from whom the city of Avranches, the main town of the Avranchin, takes its name.

In 867, by the Treaty of Compiègne, Charles the Bald gave the Avranchin to Salomon, King of Brittany. In 933, it was reunited with the Duchy of Normandy by William I of Normandy.

== Geography ==
Avranchin is located in the Armorican Massif south of Cotentin in the department of Manche in western or lower Normandy. The Thar river forms the northern border. The eastern border is formed by the Égrenne, a tributary of the Mayenne. To the north west lies the bay of Mont-Saint-Michel. The south west was once marked by the Couesnon river, however due to canal building in the 18th century the river now flows 4 km to the west of the region. The largest town in the area is Avranches. The village of Mortain is traditionally included as part of Avranchin.

== History ==
Avranchin was once the territory of the Abrincuti. During Roman rule it became part of the second division of Gallia Lugdunensis, which roughly corresponds to modern-day Normandy. After the fall of the Roman empire the area became part of the Frankish kingdom of Neustria until it was ceded to Brittany as part of the treaty of Compiègne in 867. In 933 William Longsword was given control of a large part of Brittany (Avranchin included) in return for recognizing Rudolph of France as king of West Francia. The Bretons did not recognize this agreement and had to be forcibly suppressed. Avranchin was not fully integrated into Normandy until 1009 under Richard II. In 1204 Phillip II took Normandy (and alongside it Avranchin) for France.

== See also ==
- Viscounts and counts of Avranches
