= Matthew II of Nantes =

Count of Nantes from 1084 to 1103

Matthew II (or Matthias II, died 1101×1104) was the Count of Nantes from 1084 until his death. He was the second son of Duke Hoël II and Duchess Hawise of Brittany. He was named for his father's cousin, Count Matthew I of Nantes, perhaps on the presumption that he would inherit Nantes.

In 1084, Hoel II left the Duchy of Brittany to his eldest son, Alan Fergant, and the County of Nantes, which was not always regarded as a part of Brittany at the time, to Matthew. Some modern historians have suggested that Hoel left his entire patrimony to Alan IV, and that Matthew only received Nantes in fief from Alan, but this is contradicted by contemporary sources. Hoel intended to re-establish the independence of Nantes from Brittany, and Matthew's right to Nantes was hereditary. He bore the Latin title comes Nannetensis.

Matthew may have been counselled as ruler by his uncle, Bishop Benedict. He confirmed land transactions made by his subjects, and made grants of comital land on his own authority. His date of death is given as 1101, 1103 or 1104 in different annals. In any case, he died without issue and the county of Nantes reverted to his older brother, Alan Fergant.

== Sources ==
- Everard, Judith A. (2000). Brittany and the Angevins: Province and Empire 1158–1203. Cambridge University Press.

Matthew II of Nantes House of Cornouaille
Regnal titles
Preceded by Hoel II	Count of Nantes; 1084-1103	Succeeded by Alan II
