= Gulf of Saint-Malo =

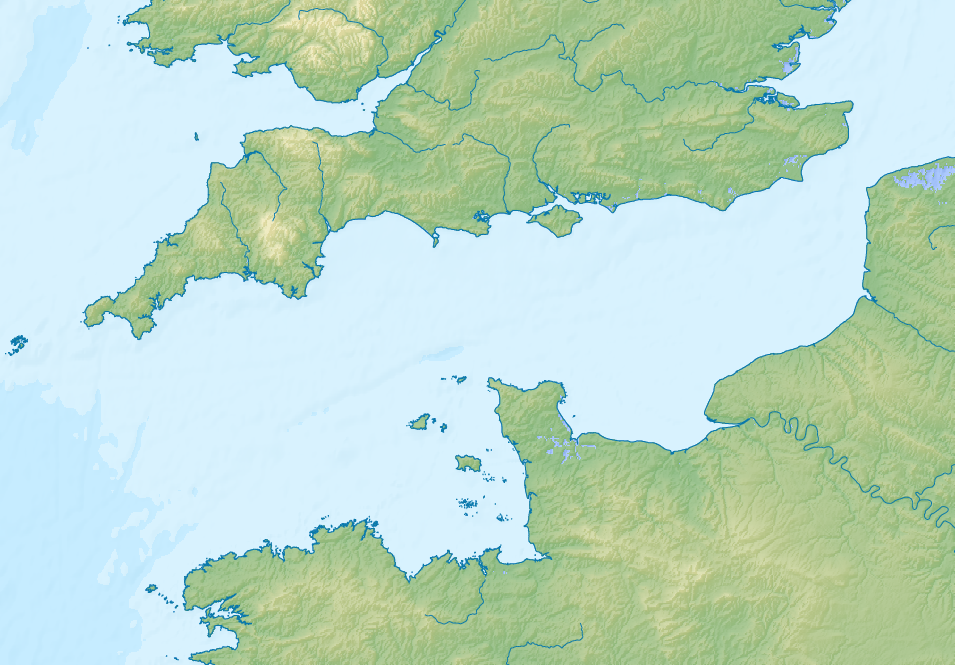
- Location within English Channel
- Location: English Channel
- Coordinates: 49°02′07″N 2°07′54″W
- Type: Gulf
- Basin countries: France; Guernsey (Note: Dependency of the British Crown, not part of the United Kingdom but not a sovereign state.); Jersey

The Gulf of Saint-Malo (Breton: Pleg-mor Sant-Maloù) is a part of the south-western English Channel between Brittany, Normandy, and the Channel Islands.

Formed by subsidence and flooding of a continental zone of about 8 500 km2, it extends from the Bréhat archipelago in the west to Guernsey and Alderney in the north and to the west coast of Cotentin (Normandy) in the east.

== Geography ==
=== Islands ===
In addition to Bréhat and its archipelago, the Channel Islands Jersey and Guernsey (and the latter's dependencies Alderney and Sark), the Chausey archipelago is situated in the centre.

=== Towns ===
From west to north-east:

- Saint-Brieuc
- Dinard
- Saint-Malo
- Le Mont-Saint-Michel
- Granville
- Barneville-Carteret
- Les Pieux
- Saint-Hélier (capital of Jersey)
- Saint Peter Port (capital of Guernsey)

=== Rivers ===
Several rivers flow into the Gulf of Saint Malo: the Rance estuary is between Dinard et Saint-Malo; the Sélune and the Sée form a common estuary in the Bay of Mont-Saint-Michel; the Couesnon enters the sea in by Mont-Saint-Michel. The mouths of the Thar, the Sienne and the Gerfleur are on the Cotentin coast.
