= Alan, Count of Nantes (988–990) =

Alan

Duke of Brittany
- Reign: 988–990
- Predecessor: Guerech
- Successor: Conan I
- Died: 990
- House: House of Nantes
- Father: Guerech, Duke of Brittany
- Mother: Aremburga of Ancenis

Alan (sometimes Alan III of Brittany or Alan III of Nantes) (born after 981, died 990) was the only known son of Guerech, Duke of Brittany, and Aremberg. With his mother he founded the castle of Ancenis around 987, according to the Chronicle of Nantes. In 988, he succeeded his father as Count of Nantes and perhaps nominal Duke of Brittany, after his father was murdered by Count Conan I of Rennes. The following two years were marked by endless warfare between Rennes and Nantes. In 990, Alan died, either of an illness or else killed by Conan I, who took Nantes and had himself proclaimed Duke of Brittany by the bishop of Nantes, Orscand de Vannes.

Regnal titles
Preceded by Guerech	Duke of Brittany; 988–990	Succeeded by Conan I
Preceded by Guerech	Count of Nantes; 988–990	Succeeded by Conan I
