= Treaty of Compiègne (867) =

867 treaty between Charles the Bald and Salomon of Brittany

The Treaty of Compiègne was an August 867 agreement in which King Charles the Bald ceded the peninsula of Cotentin to King Salomon of Brittany. Though not specified in the treaty, the territory of Avranchin, including Mont Saint-Michel, was likely included in the concession.

== See also ==
- Treaty of Compiègne (1624)
