= Alan Canhiart =

Alain Canhiart (died 1058) was the count of Cornouaille from 1020 to 1058. He was the son of Benoît de Cornouaille and the father of Hoël II, Duke of Brittany. His family name, Canhiart, is understood to be derived from the old Breton Kann Yac'h (Note: translated from breton, vigorous combatant) and was translated into the Latin texts of his era as Bellator fortis.

== Life ==
According to Paul Le Baud, Alain was a descendant of Rivallon Mur Marzou and therefore was a male-line descendant of the early kings of Brittany. As Count of Cornouaille he inherited his regnal rights from the family that appears to have ruled the Cornouaille region of Brittany from about the 10th century. (Note: This Cornouaille region of Brittany is geographically distinct from the Cornwall region of England.) His father Benoît (or Benedict) died between 1008 and 1029. He was the Count-Bishop of Cornouaille; he had been elected Bishop of Quimper around 990 and exercised the offices jointly but kept them separated. (Note: Benoît held the joint title Count-Bishop, or Lord-Bishop during the era when Bishops were also lords and before the Roman Catholic church forced the separation of secular from ecclesiastical titles, rights and powers.) His mother was Guigoëdon (or Guiguoedon); she was the daughter of Orscand le Grand, the Bishop of Vannes. (Note: In this era the Roman Catholic church had not yet imposed mandatory celibacy on its prelates, and bishops and priests alike frequently were married and had issue.) She was a member of the family of Alan I, King of Brittany. (Note: Orscand had de facto control of the Vannetais region of Brittany at the end of the 10th century.)

Alain became Count of Cornouaille around 1020 when his father renounced this title. Alain's brother Orscand succeeded their father as Bishop of Cornouaille.

At one point Alain supported rebels who opposed Alan III, Duke of Brittany. Alan III prevailed and punished Count Alain by confiscating his territories, in particular Belle-Île-en-Mer. Alain returned to the duke's good graces by facilitating his marriage to Berthe of Blois, the daughter of Count Odo; the duke allowed Alain to recover the property that had been seized that belonged to the dowry of Alain's mother.

Alain married Judith of Nantes and through her gained a claim on the County of Nantes. In part as a result of his rising power, he was attacked by Alan III but was able to push back the duke's army in 1031 in a battle near Locronan. In this battle Alain was assisted by Saint Ronan. Alan III and Alain were again reconciled.

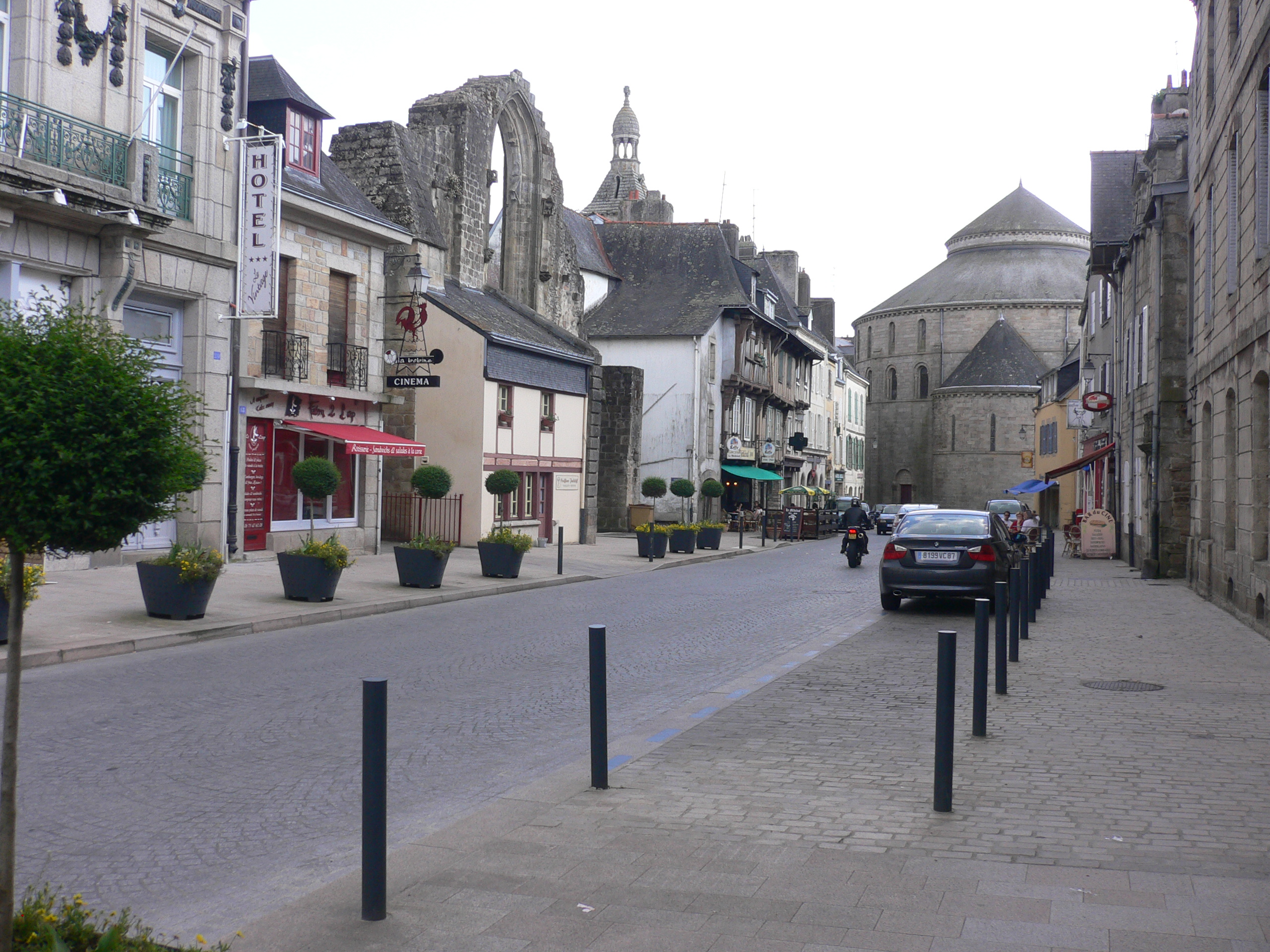
Quimperlé, with a view of the Romanesque Basilica from the Abbey of Sainte-Croix, founded by Alain

After this second battle with the Duke of Brittany, Alain faced difficulties with his vassals in the Viscounty of Leon, most notably Guyomarch I. Guyomarch I allied with Morvan, Viscount of Faou, to oppose Alain. Alain was successful in putting down these revolts.

Around 1029, after a serious illness, Alain founded the Abbey of Sainte-Croix of Quimperlé with the assistance of his brother Orscand, the bishop. He included Belle-Île in his donation to the abbey.

In 1050, at the death of his wife's nephew, Matthew (Mathias) I of Nantes, Alain confirmed her inheritance and his rights to rule Nantes as regent for his son Hoel, the eventual Count of Nantes.

== Family ==
Around 1026, Alain married Judith of Nantes, the daughter of Judicaël of Nantes, who became the heir to the County of Nantes after the death of her nephew, Matthew, in 1050. As was the custom of the period, under the dowry arrangements Alain obtained five villages in Quistillic and half of the church of Cluthgual with the sepulchre and all appertaining rights. (Note: Judith inherited Nantes from her nephew Mathias I of Nantes.)

Alain and Judith had six children

- Hoël II – Count of Nantes, Count of Rennes, and eventually Duke of Brittany (jure uxoris)
- Guérech (Quiriac) (1030–1079) – elected Bishop of Nantes in 1059, consecrated 7 January 1061
- Budic – died 1091
- Hodiern – Abbess of Locmaria de Quimper
- Benoît – Abbot of the Abbey of Sainte-Croix de Quimperlé in 1066, elected Bishop of Nantes in 1079, consecrated in 1081; retired in 1114 and murdered in 1115
- Orguen, or Agnes – wife of Odo I, Count of Penthièvre

== Death and succession ==
Alain died in 1058. He was buried at Quimperlé. His tomb was destroyed during the French Revolution. (Note: Jacques Cambry states that his tomb contained an effigy along the traditions of the period representing Alain with a short sword, a shield and his arms.)

He was succeeded as Count of Cornouaille by his son Hoël.
