= Hoël I of Brittany =

Hoel I

Duke of Brittany
- Reign: c. 960–981
- Predecessor: Drogo
- Successor: Guerech
- Died: 981
- Issue: Judicaël, Count of Nantes; Hoël of Nantes
- House: House of Nantes
- Father: Alan II, Duke of Brittany
- Mother: Judith

Hoël I of Brittany was an illegitimate son of Alan II and Judith. (Note: In the "Chronique de Nantes" Hi nompe progenitiex nobili matre, nomine Judith, exctiterant, antequam Alanus praefatus sororem Theobaldi comitis Blesensis in uxorem duceret) He was Count of Nantes and Duke of Brittany from 960 to 981.

== Life ==
Upon the death of Drogo, the government of Brittany splintered among the leading nobles. Evidence of a fractured leadership appeared in letters from Pope John XIII to Brittany who addressed "Juhel Béranger and his son Conan, as well as Hoël and his brother Guérech." (Note: « Les Papes et les Ducs de Bretagne », B.A Pocquet du Haut-Jussé : Chapitre préliminaire, p. 37)

In 975, Hoël I entered into a conflict with Conan I Le Tort, the Count of Rennes, son of Juhel Béranger and the eventual Duke of Brittany after the rule of Hoël and his brother Guérech. (Note: At the time Conan I was a vassal of Theobald I of Blois) Conan I controlled the north of Brittany and considered himself the ruler of Brittany. Hoël's army was supplemented by the troops of Geoffrey I of Anjou while Conan I's army was supported by the forces of the House of Blois. A battle ensued at Conquereuil where Geoffrey defeated Conan I, although the military result of the battle was indecisive, as different results are recorded in the Chronicles of Nantes and Mont St Michel. (Note: En fait l’issue du combat fut très indécise : victoire nantaise pour la Chronique de Nantes et victoire rennaise pour celle du Mont-Saint-Michel : Anno DCCCCLXXXI !)

In 981, Hoël I worked to have his brother Guérech elected Bishop of Nantes to replace Gauthier I who had died.

== Family ==
The name of Hoël I's spouse is unknown. He had at least two known children:

- Judicaël (c 979 - 1004) - he became Count of Nantes and was the father of Budic and Judith of Nantes
- Hoël

== Death ==
In 981, during Guérech's visit to the Metropolitan of Tours, who controlled all bishops in Brittany, Hoël I was assassinated by Galuron under the orders of Conan I. Guérech left his bishopric of Nantes before being consecrated Bishop and was elected Count of Nantes.

== Supplemental Reading ==
- Chédeville, André; Tonnerre, Noël-Yves (1987). La Bretagne féodale- XI^{e} - XIII^{e}. Rennes: Ouest-France Université Rennes. ISBN 2-7373-0014-2.
- Tonnerre, Noël-Yves (1994). Naissance de la Bretagne: Géographie historique et structures sociales de la Bretagne méridionale: Nantais et Vannetais de la fin du VIII^{e} siècle à la fin du XII^{e} siècle. Angers: Presses de l’Université d'Angers. ISBN 2-903075-58-1.

Regnal titles
| Preceded by Drogo | Duke of Brittany; Count of Nantes; 960–981 | Succeeded by Guerech |
