= Abrincatui =

Gallic tribe

The Abrincatui or Abricantui were a Gallic tribe dwelling in the south of the Cotentin Peninsula during the Roman period.

== Name ==
Location of the Abrincatui (centre-north of the map)

They are mentioned as Abrincatuos by Pliny (1st c. AD), ’Abrinkátouoi (’Aβρινκάτουοι) by Ptolemy (2nd c. AD), and as Abrincatis and Abrincateni in the Notitia Dignitatum (5th c. AD).

The city of Avranches, attested in the 6th c. AD as civitas Abrincatum ('civitas of the Abrincatui', Abrincae ca. 550, de Avrenchis in 1055–66), and the region of Avranchin, are named after the Gallic tribe.

== Geography ==
The territory of the Abrincatui mostly corresponded the later regions of Avranchin and Mortainais. It was inherited with only slight border changes by the civitas Abrincatum and, later, by the diocese of Avranches. However, the area of Mortainais was mostly uninhabited until the Roman period, and remained sparsely populated at the turn of the first millennium AD.

Two pre-Roman oppida were located in Le Petit-Celland and Carolles, with other settlements in Montanel and near Mortain.

== History ==
They were a client tribe of the Venelli until the Roman occupation in 49 BC, when they were separated.
