= Budic of Nantes =

Budic of Nantes was Count of Nantes from 1005 to his death in 1038.

== Life ==
Budic was the son of Count Judicaël of Nantes, From 1005 to 1010, he ruled under the scrutiny of Walter II, Bishop of Nantes (1005–1041) who had been appointed by the Count of Rennes Geoffrey I of Brittany.

Budic took advantage of the Bishop's pilgrimage in the Holy Land around 1020 to seize the episcopal possession and destroy the prelate's castle. Back in Brittany, the Bishop asked for the Count of Renne's intervention while Budic asked for Count Fulk III of Anjou's assistance. This led to the loss of part of the lands held by the Counts of Nantes in the south of Loire, that is to say almost the whole Mauges, in 1025. The building of Clisson castle was the sign of the Count of Nantes' wish to stop the progression of the County of Anjou.

Around 1030, after a last conflict with Alan III, Budic sided with the Count of Rennes. On April 5, 1030, he subscribed to a charter by Alan III in favor of Mont Saint-Michel Abbey This crisis led to a decline of the County of Nantes' authority as it was at this time that the first castles were built in the peripheral parts of the pagus of Nantes: Châteaubriant, La Roche-Bernard, Machecoul.

Budic and his wife Hawise had three sons:

- Mathathias
- Matthew I of Nantes
- Budic

== Sources ==
- Chronique de Nantes Présentée et annotée par René Merlet: Lire ce livre avec Gallica:
- André Chédeville and Noël-Yves Tonnerre La Bretagne féodale XIe-XIIIe siècle. Ouest-France Université Rennes (1987).
- Hubert Guillotel Actes des ducs de Bretagne (944-1148) Presses universitaires de Rennes, Rennes (2014).
