= Rudalt, Count of Vannes =

Rudalt
- Count of Vannes
- Died: November 912
- Father: Alan I, King of Brittany
- Mother: Oreguen

Rudalt was count of Vannes and was the son of Alan I, King of Brittany, and Oreguen. Succeeding his father in 907 CE, Rudalt apparently ruled Vannes until being forced to flee by Viking incursions. Rudalt died in November 912.
