= Hoël II of Brittany =

Duke of Brittany from 1066 to 1072

Hoël II (c. 1031–1084) was Count of Kernev (French: Cornouaille, Breton: Kernev), from 1058 as Hoël V. On the basis of his marriage to Hawise, Duchess of Brittany, in 1066, he became Duke of Brittany jure uxoris.

== Life ==
Hoël was the son of Count Alan Canhiart of Cornouaille and his wife, Judith of Nantes, granddaughter of the illegitimate son of Duke Alan II of Brittany. Hoël started the House of Cornouaille of Brittany, (Note: The Cornouaille region of Brittany is distinct from the Cornwall region of Britain.) which ruled the duchy until 1156.

Hoël became count of Nantes in 1054. The title came to him from his maternal cousin, Count Matthew I of Nantes, who died in 1050. Alan Canhiart seize the county in Hoël's name in 1050, and ruled it as regent for his son until 1054. Duke Conan II of Brittany attempted to seize Nantes in 1054 but was defeated.

Conan died childless in December 1066 and the duchy passed to Hawise and Hoël, but their marriage may have further strengthened Brittany at a time when external interference was attempted by William the Conqueror. Hawise died in 1072.

During his reign Hoël faced several rebellions from Breton nobles. Geoffrey Grenonat of Rennes (an illegitimate son of Duke Alan III of Brittany and half-brother of Hawise) led a revolt and was joined by Ralph de Gael who had returned to Brittany from England after the failure of the previous year's Revolt of the Earls. William the Conqueror came to Hoël's aid and in 1076 besieged Ralph in Dol, after which Hoël finally made peace with Ralph.

== Marriage and children ==
Hoël and Hawise had:

- Alan IV, succeeded to the duchy of Brittany
- Matthew, succeeded to the county of Nantes.

== Bibliography ==
- Dunbabin, Jean (1985). France in the Making, 843-1180. Oxford University Press.
- Everard, Judith A. (2000). Brittany and the Angevins: Province and Empire 1158–1203. Cambridge University Press.
- Keats-Rohan (1992). "The Bretons and Normans of England 1066-1154" Nottingham Medieval Studies (PDF). Archived from the original (PDF) on 2011-07-24.
- Chisholm, Hugh, ed. (1911). "Ralph de Guader" . Encyclopædia Britannica (11th ed.). Cambridge University Press.
- B. Gregory Bailey; Meaghan E. Bernard; Gregory Carrier; Cherise L. Elliott; John Langdon; Natalie Leishman; Michal Mlynarz; Oksana Mykhed; Lindsay C. Sidders (January 2008). "Coming of Age and the Family in Medieval England". Journal of Family History. 33 (1): 41–60. doi:10.1177/0363199007308449. S2CID 143864636.

Hoël II of Brittany House of Cornouaille Died: 1084
Regnal titles
Preceded by Conan II	Duke of Brittany; 1066–1072 with Hawise	Succeeded by Alan Fergant
Preceded by Alan Canhiart	Count of Cornouaille; 1058-1084	Succeeded by Alan Fergant
Preceded by Judith	Count of Nantes; 1054–1084 with Judith (1054-1063)	Succeeded by Matthew II
