= Guerech of Nantes =

Guerech

Duke of Brittany
- Reign: 981–988
- Predecessor: Hoël I
- Successor: Alan of Nantes
- Died: 988
- Spouse: Aremburga of Ancenis
- Issue: Alan, Count of Nantes
- House: House of Nantes
- Father: Alan II, Duke of Brittany
- Mother: Judith

Guerech of Brittany, was Count of Nantes and Duke of Brittany from 981 to 988.

== Life ==
Guerech was the second illegitimate son of Alan II and Judith. He succeeded his brother Hoël I upon his death.

Guerech had been brought up at the Abbey of Saint-Benoît-sur-Loire, near Orléans. He was appointed bishop of Nantes in 981 but was presumably not consecrated. He did not exercise priesthood and it was Hugh (Hugo), who reportedly had the "character of wise and austere life" according to Albertus Magnus, who ruled de facto over the spiritual part of the Church of Nantes. However, Guerech kept the temporal rule of the bishopric, which he ruled with the County of Nantes for the seven years of his reign as duke.

He pursued the war his brother had started against Count Conan I of Rennes. In 982, Guerech signed a treaty with Count William IV of Poitou, who confirmed the possessions of Nantes south of the Loire — the pagi of Herbauges, Tiffauges and Mauges — which his father, Alan II of Brittany, had obtained in 942. The following year, Guerech wento to the Court of the King of West Francia, Lothair to pay homage. On the way back, he was stopped by Count Geoffrey I of Anjou, who kept him a prisoner and demanded that Guerech admitted he had received Nantes from the Count of Anjou and became his vassal.

The same year, Guerech's wife Aremburga had a strategic fortress built in Ancenis, the Château d'Ancenis. Conan, who had ordered Hoël I's murder according to the Chronicle of Nantes and rightly feared that the counts of Nantes and Anjou would unite against him, is said to have convinced Guerech's physician, a Heroicus, also abbot of the Redon Abbey, to poison the duke.

Like his brother, Guerech died prematurely in 988 and was buried in Redon Abbey.

== Family ==
Guerech had married Aremburga of Ancenis. They had an only son, Alan, who succeeded him as Duke of Brittany but died two years later.

Regnal titles
Preceded by Hoël I	Duke of Brittany; 981–988	Succeeded by Alan
Preceded by	Count of Nantes	Succeeded by Alan
