= Cotentin Peninsula =

Peninsula in Normandy, France

Coordinates: 49°30′N 1°30′W

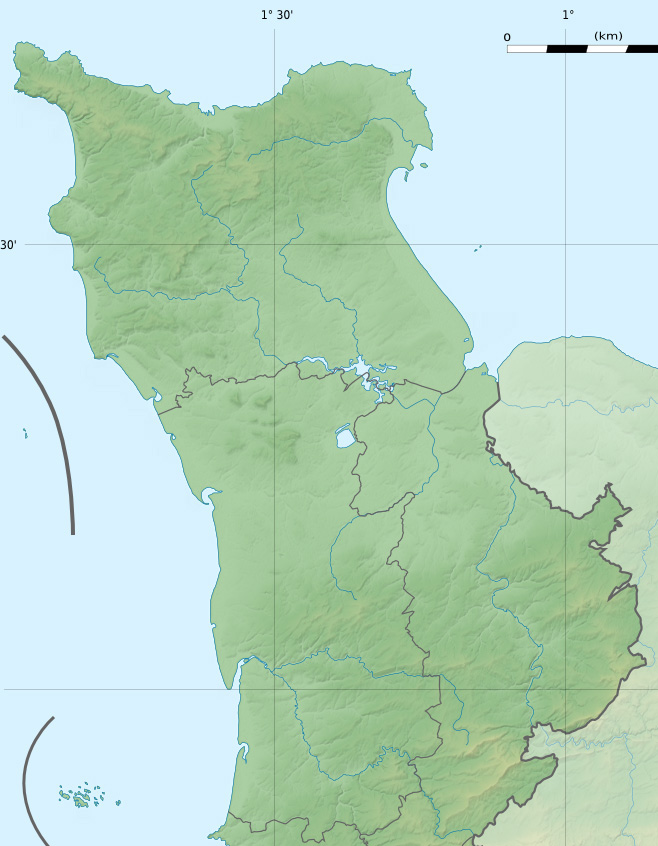
- Location of the peninsula

- Location within France

Geography
- Location: Manche, Normandy
- Adjacent to: English Channel
- Area: 6,600 km^{2} (2,500 sq mi)

Administration
- France

The Cotentin Peninsula (US: /ˌkoʊtɒ̃ˈtæ̃/, French: [kɔtɑ̃tɛ̃]; Norman: Cotentîn [kotɑ̃ˈtẽ]), also known as the Cherbourg Peninsula, is a peninsula in Normandy that forms part of the northwest coast of France. It extends north-westward into the English Channel, towards Great Britain. To its west lie the Gulf of Saint-Malo and the Channel Islands, and to the southwest lies the peninsula of Brittany.

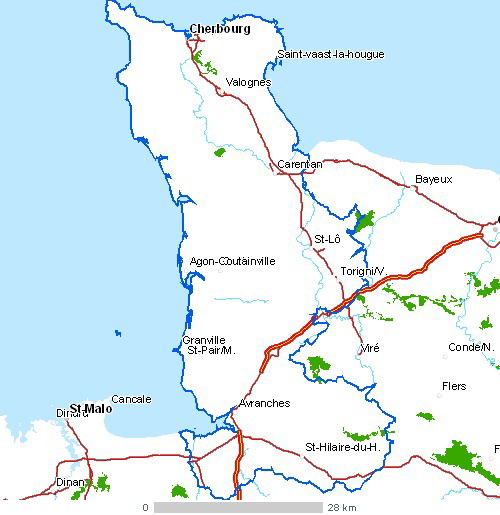
Map of the Cotentin Peninsula

The peninsula lies wholly within the department of Manche, in the region of Normandy.

== Geography ==
The Cotentin Peninsula is part of the Armorican Massif (with the exception of the Plain lying in the Paris Basin) and lies between the estuary of the Vire river and Mont Saint-Michel Bay. It is divided into three areas: the headland of Cap de la Hague, the Cotentin Pass (the Plain), and the valley of the Saire River (Val de Saire). It forms the bulk of the department of Manche. Its southern part, known as "le Marais" (the Marshlands), crosses from east to west from just north west of Saint-Lô and east of Lessay and marks a natural border with the rest of Manche.

The largest town on the peninsula is Cherbourg-en-Cotentin, a major cross-channel port on the north coast, with a population of approximately 120,000. The population of the peninsula is about 250,000.

The western coast of the peninsula, known as the Côte des Îles ("Islands Coast"), faces the Channel Islands. Ferry links serve Carteret and the islands of Jersey, Guernsey and Alderney from Diélette. Off the east coast of the peninsula lies the island of Tatihou and the Îles Saint-Marcouf.

The oldest stone in France is found in outcroppings on the coast of Cap de la Hague, at the tip of the peninsula.

In some historical documents the northern part of the peninsula is referred to as an island, owing to a broad marshy area that separated it from the mainland and which was subject to flooding. Only a small strip of land in the heath of Lessay connected the peninsula to the mainland. The building of portes à flot (fr) – gates at the outlets of rivers which close under the pressure of seawater at rising tide and open under the pressure of fresh water at ebb – on the west coast and in the Baie des Veys on the east coast, have led to the Cotentin becoming a peninsula.

The Côte des Havres lies between the Cape of Carteret and the Cape of Granville. To the northwest, there are two sand dune systems: one stretching between Siouville-Hague and Vauville, the other one stretching between Cap of Carteret and Baubigny.

== History ==
=== Roman Armorica ===
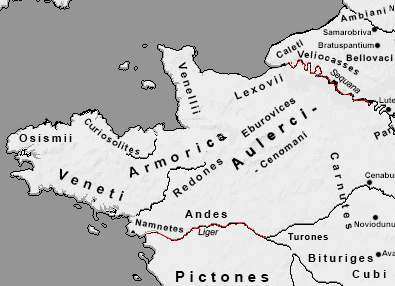
Roman Armorica

The peninsula formed part of the Roman geographical area of Armorica. The town known today as Coutances, capital of the Unelli, a Gaulish tribe, acquired the name of Constantia in 298 during the reign of Roman emperor Constantius Chlorus. The base of the peninsula, called in Latin the pagus Constantinus—meaning the "land of Constantius"—, joined with the pagus Coriovallensis centred upon Cherbourg to the north, subsequently became known under the modern French name Cotentin. Under the Carolingians it was administered by viscounts drawn successively from members of the Saint-Sauveur family, at their seat Saint-Sauveur on the Douve.

=== Norse settlement ===
After the collapse of Frankish power in the area, the peninsula was heavily settled by Norse settlers from the region of the Irish Sea whose origins were Norwegian.

There are indications of a whaling industry there dating to the ninth century, possibly introduced by Norsemen. They were followed by Anglo-Norse and Anglo-Danish people, who established themselves as farmers.

While very little archeological excavations about the Vikings were done in Normandy, many placenames are derived from the Norse language pointing to a constant use of Old Norse during four or five generations in certain parts. Coastal features bore Norse names as did the three pagi of Haga, Sarnes and Helganes (as late as 1027). The Norwegians may even have set up a þing, an assembly of all free men, whose meeting place may be preserved in the name of Le Tingland, near Jobourg. Other examples include La Hague, from hagi ("meadow" or "enclosure"), and La Hougue, from haugr ("hill" or "mound"). Other names are typical: all those ending with -tot (Quettetot..) from topt "site of a house" (modern -toft), -bec (Bricquebec, Houlbec..) from bekkr "brook", "stream", etc.

In 867 the king of the Franks Charles the Bald ceded the Cotentin Peninsula to King Alan the Great of Brittany who although he had a successful record of fighting Vikings could not retain control or stop Norwegian. Brittany lost the Cotentin Peninsula (and nearby Avranchin) to the Duchy of Normandy in 933. There was initially much hostility between the new Danish overlords and the Norwegian settlers in the Cotentin, including a pagan rebellion against Longsword's rule.

=== Medieval history ===
In 1088 Robert Curthose, Duke of Normandy, enfeoffed the Cotentin to his brother Henry, who later became king of England. Henry, as count of the Cotentin, established his first power base there and in the adjoining Avranchin, which lay to the south, beyond the River Thar.

During the Hundred Years War, King Edward III of England landed in the bay of La Hougue, and then went to the Church of Quettehou in Val de Saire. It was there that Edward III knighted his son Edward, the Black Prince. A remembrance plaque can be seen next to the altar.

=== Modern history ===
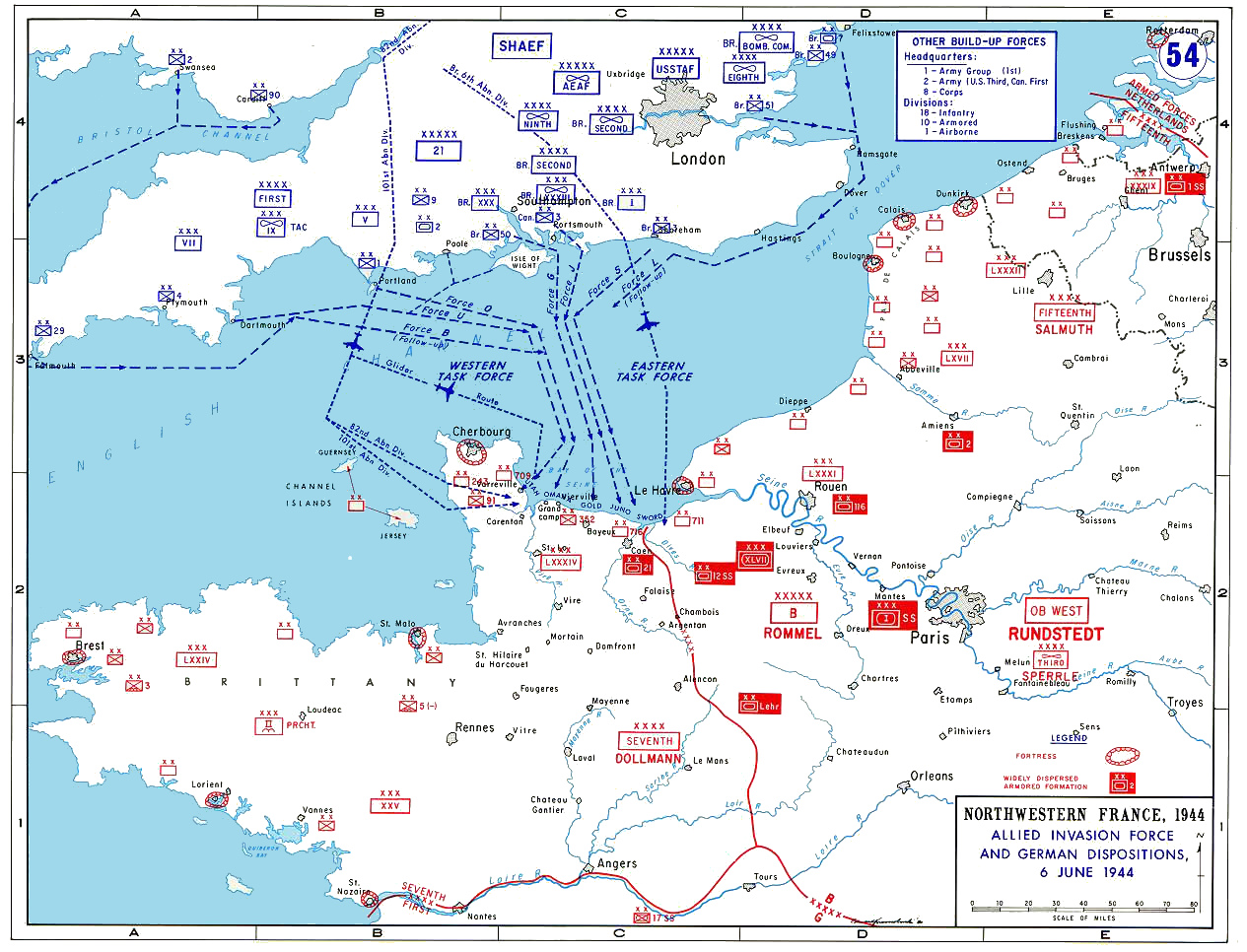
D-Day assault map of Normandy and northwest coastal France

The naval Battle of La Hogue in 1692 was fought off Saint-Vaast-la-Hougue near Barfleur.

The town of Valognes was, until the French Revolution, a provincial social resort for the aristocracy, nicknamed the Versailles of Normandy. The social scene was described in the novels of Jules Barbey d'Aurevilly (1808–1889) (himself from the Cotentin). Little now remains of the grand houses and châteaux; they were destroyed by combat there during the Battle of Normandy in World War II. The westernmost part of the D-Day landings was at Utah Beach, on the southeastern coast of the peninsula, and was followed by a campaign to occupy the peninsula and take Cherbourg.

The genetic history of the modern inhabitants of Cotentin Peninsula was studied by the University of Leicester in 2015–2016 to determine the extent of Scandinavian ancestry in Normandy. The results were inconclusive.

== Economy ==
The peninsula's main economic resource is agriculture. Dairy and vegetable farming are prominent activities, as well as aquaculture of oysters and mussels along the coast. Cider and Calvados are produced from locally grown apples and pears.

The region hosts two important nuclear power facilities. At Flamanville there is a nuclear power plant, and the La Hague nuclear reprocessing plant is located a few miles to the north, at Beaumont-Hague. The facility stores all high-level waste from the French nuclear power program in one large vault. The nuclear industry provides a substantial portion of jobs in the region. The roads used for transport of nuclear waste have been blocked many times in the past by environmental action group Greenpeace. Local environmental groups have voiced concerns about the radioactivity levels of the cooling water at both these nuclear sites, which is being flushed into the bay of Vauville; however, the emitted radioactivity is several orders of magnitude below natural background levels and does not pose any hazard.

There are two major naval shipyards in Cherbourg. The state-owned shipyard Naval Group has built French nuclear submarines since the 1960s. Privately owned CMN builds frigates and patrol vessels for various states, mostly from the Middle East.

Tourism is also an important economic activity in this region. Many tourists visit the D-Day invasion beaches, including Utah Beach in the Cotentin. At Sainte-Mère-Église a few miles away from the beach, there is a museum commemorating the action of the 82nd and 101st Airborne Divisions. The Cité de la Mer in Cherbourg is a museum of oceanic and underseas subjects. The main attraction is Redoutable, the first French nuclear submarine, launched in 1967.

== Culture ==
After quitting political life, the political thinker Alexis de Tocqueville (1805–1859) retreated to the family estate of Tocqueville, where he wrote much of his work.

Due to its comparative isolation, the peninsula is one of the remaining strongholds of the Norman language, and the local dialect is known as Cotentinais. The Norman language poet Côtis-Capel (1915–1986) described the environment of the peninsula, while French language poet Jacques Prévert made his home at Omonville-la-Petite. The painter Jean-François Millet (1814–1875) was also born on the peninsula.

The Norman language writer Alfred Rossel, native of Cherbourg, composed many songs which form part of the heritage of the region. Rossel's song Sus la mé ("on the sea") is often sung as a regional patriotic song.

== See also ==
- List of peninsulas

== Other sources ==
- Goyou, George's (1913). "Normandy" . In Herbermann, Charles (ed.). Catholic Encyclopedia. New York: Robert Appleton Company.
- Renaud, Jean: Les Vikings et la Normandie (Ouest-France. 2002) ISBN 2-7373-0258-7
- Renaud, Jean: Les dieux des Vikings (Ouest-France. 2002) ISBN 2-7373-1468-2
