= Judicael Berengar =

Count of Rennes

Judicael (or Juhel, Judhel, Judhael; died c. 979), thus called in Breton sources, alias Berengar (or Berengarius) his name in Frankish sources, and sometimes known as Judicael Berengar, with both names being used together, was a Count of Rennes in the 10th century.

== Biography ==
There are conflicting accounts of his parentage, one popular solution making him the son and successor of a count Berengar (sometimes identified with Berengar of Rennes, sometimes with that man's supposed maternal grandson of the same name) by a daughter of Gurvand, Duke of Brittany. However, an 11th-century collection of Angevin genealogies describes him as the son of Pascweten, son of Alan I, King of Brittany.

In 939 he fought alongside Alan II, Duke of Brittany and Hugh II, Count of Maine against the Vikings/Norsemen at the Battle of Trans-la-Forêt.

He is first documented as a count in the year 944. He witnessed charters of Alan II, Duke of Brittany, and on the latter's death apparently fell under the control of Wicohen, Archbishop of Dol. Later sources report the rescue of Judicael and his (unnamed) wife by his son Conan I. He appears to have been dead by 979, when his son was at the court of Odo I, Count of Blois.

== Sources ==
- Cunliffe, Barry (2021). Bretons and Britons: The Fight for Identity. Oxford University Press.
- Mueller-Vollmer, Tristan; Wolf, Kirsten, eds. (2022). "Chronology". Vikings: An Encyclopedia of Conflict, Invasions, and Raids. ABC-CLIO.

Regnal titles
Preceded by Berengar of Rennes	Count of Rennes	Succeeded by Conan I
