= Judicael of Brittany =

Judicael (or Yezekael) (died 888 or 889) was the Duke of Brittany from 876 to his death. He was a son of a daughter of Erispoe and claimed Brittany after the death of the pretenders Wrhwant and Pascweten in mid 876.

During the reign of Salomon (857–874), Judicael controlled either all of Cornouaille or just Poher (Poucaer) with the title of princeps Poucher. He represented western Breton interests against those of the powerful rulers of Vannes, Pascweten and then Alan the Great, who opposed his claim to the Breton dukedom.

Judicael reconciled with Alan in order to fight the Vikings; together, they defeated them at the Battle of Questembert in 888 or 889, but Judicael died in the fighting.

== See also ==
- Dukes of Brittany family tree

== Sources ==
- Smith, Julia M. H. Province and Empire: Brittany and the Carolingians. Cambridge University Press: 1992.

Preceded by Pascweten and Wrhwant	Duke of Brittany disputed with Alan I	Succeeded by Alan I
Preceded by Wrhwant	Count of Rennes	Succeeded by Berengar II
