= Berengar II of Neustria =

9th-century French noble

Berengar II (died 896) was the Count of Bayeux and Rennes and Margrave of the Northern or Norman March from 886 until his death a decade later.

In 874, Brittany's internal politics were thrown into turmoil when King Salomon was murdered by a rival. The resulting surge of Viking attacks made possible by the power vacuum was narrowly held at bay by a hasty Breton-Frankish alliance between Alan the Great of Vannes and Berengar of Rennes. Between 889 and 90, the Seine Vikings moved into Brittany, hard on the heels of the Loire fleet that Alan and Berengar had successfully driven out (this latter force had broken up into several small flotillas and sailed west). Alain again joined forces with Berengar of Rennes and led two Breton armies into the field. Finding their retreat down the Marne blocked, the Vikings hauled their ships overland to the Vire and besieged Saint-Lo, where the Bretons virtually annihilated the fleet.

Berengar's kin became the first Gallo-speaking lords holding residence within Brittany (Rennes and Penthièvre, rather than the Loire Valley-predominant Nantes or Vannes), as a consequence of the Breton nobility being more or less broken under the Norman invasions of the 880s and as a reward for holding his ground against their attacks.

Berengar is speculated to have married the daughter of Gurvand, Duke of Brittany, by which relationship he attained the countship of Rennes. This would make him brother-in-law of Judicael, Duke of Brittany. He is thought to be the Berengar of Bayeux whose daughter Poppa was captured in a raid and married to Rollo of Normandy. Various reconstructions make him father, grandfather, or great-grandfather of Judicael Berengar, later Count of Rennes.

== Sources ==
- Price, Neil (1989). The Vikings in Brittany (PDF). Archived (PDF) from the original on 2021-08-28.
- Arthur de la Borderie (1898). Histoire de Bretagne. Vol. 2. p. 334.
- Musset, Lucien (1965). Les invasions: le second assaut contre I'Europe Chrétienne.
- Anglo-Saxon Chronicle. 890.

Regnal titles
| Preceded by Vacant previously held by Gurvand | Count of Rennes; 886-896 | Succeeded by Judicael Berengar |
| Preceded by Henry of Franconia | Margrave of the Norman March; 886-896 | Succeeded by unknown |
