= Cornouaille =

Historic province of Brittany

Coordinates: 47.9958°N 4.0978°W

Cornouaille Kernev, Kerne
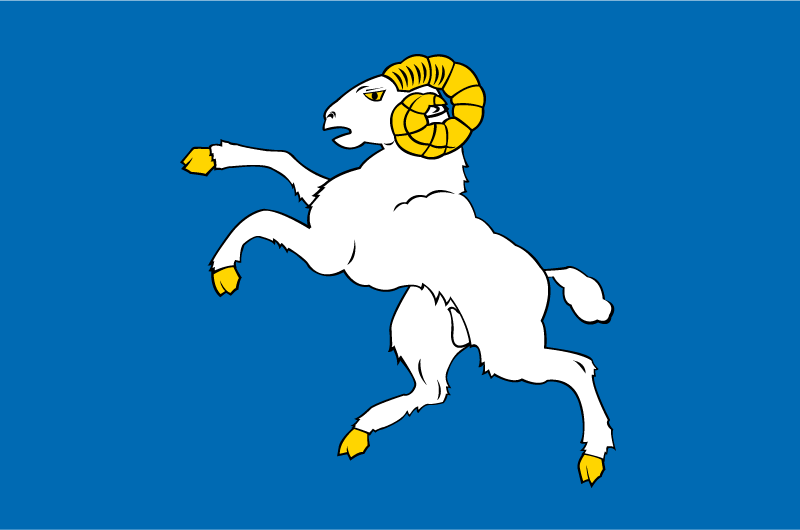
- Flag Coat of arms

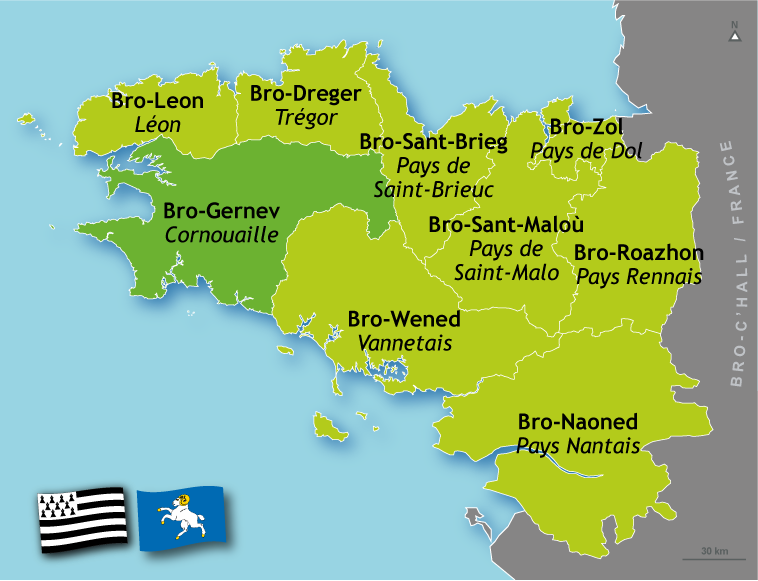
- Cornouaille's location within Brittany
- Country: France
- Historic capital: Quimper

Area
  - Total: 5,979 km^{2} (2,309 sq mi)

Cornouaille (French pronunciation: [kɔʁnwaj]; Breton: Kernev, Kerne) is a historical region on the west coast of Brittany in West France. The name is cognate with Cornwall in neighbouring Great Britain. This can be explained by the settlement of Cornouaille by migrant princes from Cornwall who created an independent principality founded by Rivelen Mor Marthou, and the founding of the Bishopric of Cornouaille by ancient saints from Cornwall. Celtic Britons and the settlers in Brittany spoke a common language, which later evolved into Breton, Welsh and Cornish.

== Etymology ==
The toponym Cornouaille was established in the early Middle Ages in the southwest of the Breton peninsula. Prior to this, following the withdrawal of Rome from Britain, British migrants from what is now Devon had established the region of Domnonea (in Breton) or Domnonée (in French) in the north of the peninsula, taken from the Latin Dumnonia.

The first mention in surviving records of a Cornouaille-related name was made between 852 and 857, when Anaweten, bishop of Saint-Corentin at Quimper Cathedral, took over the Cornugallensis under the order of Nominoe, Duke of Brittany and Tad ar Vro. The names Cornwall and Cornouaille, like the surname Cornwallis, are from Corn-wealas. The first element is from the name of a Brythonic tribe Latinized as Cornovii, meaning 'peninsula people', from the Celtic kernou, 'horn, headland', from PIE *ker- 'uppermost part of the body, head, horn, top, summit'. The second element is the Anglo-Saxon suffix -wealas, from walh, a word used by the Germanic speakers for 'a non-Germanic foreigner', especially Celtic speakers but also sometimes used for Romance-language speakers. Walh is an element found in the words and names walnut, Walloon, Wales, Wallasey, Waleswood, Wallachia, Wallace, Walcheren, and Walsh.

A Corn-/Kern- name was used in reference to resettlement by a second wave of Celts from Great Britain in formerly Dumnonian-seized lands. This is related to the distinction made in French between Grande-Bretagne (Great Britain) and Bretagne (Brittany) – Brittany having originally been thought of as a British colony (and the second such in the same area). Cornouaille is known in Breton as Kernev or Bro-Gernev, and in Latin as Cornugallia or Cornubia. In Cornish, Kernev is written Kernow, but the name is pronounced the same in both languages.

== History ==
Strong contacts between Armorica (a larger region than the Duchy of Brittany or modern Brittany) and southern Britain had already been noted by Julius Caesar. Native British troops were hired to support the usurpation of Magnus Maximus, who is said to have settled them in Armorica. Settlements expanded when invading Anglo-Saxons expanded westward within Britain. Strong links existed in the 6th century between the British and Armorican territories. Legends about King Arthur and the Matter of Britain make frequent reference to the maritime connections between the peoples of Wales, southern Ireland, Cornwall in southwestern Britain and the early kingdoms of Brittany, cf. the tale of Tristan and Iseult.

The existence of an ancient district in Anjou called "la Cornuaille" has led to the hypothesis that Cornouaille may have been a geographical or military label for all of southern Brittany as far as the northern shore of Domnonée in the 6th or 7th century.

At the origin of this feudal county, the reigning dynasty acceded to a dukedom of the region, which then passed to the Ancient Lord-Bishop of Quimper.

== Diocese ==
The name Cornouaille signifies the diocese of Quimper which persisted until the French Revolution. The diocese covered more than half of the south of Finistère, and extended over part of Morbihan and the Côtes-d'Armor. There were two archdeacons, one for Cornouaille and one for Poher. There were also a cantor, a treasurer, a theologian and twelve canons. This episcopal division was the poorest in Brittany.

After the French Revolution, the new constitution created a diocese of Finistère, erasing that of the diocese of Kerne (Cournouaille); most of the old diocese was absorbed into the new.

== Traditional districts ==
Flag of Pays de l'Aven

Flag of Bidar

Flag of Pays Bigouden

Flag of Pays de Calanhel

Flag of Cap Sizun

Flag of Chtou

Flag of Dardoup

Flag of Pays Fañch

Flag of Fisel

Flag of Pays Glazik

Flag of Kernevodez

Flag of Penn Sardin

Flag of Plougastel

Flag of Poher

Flag of Presqu'île de Crozon

Flag of Pays Rouzig

== List of rulers ==
- Gradlon (semi-legendary)
- Rivelen Mor Marthou (c. 430)
- Congar (c. 450)
- Daniel Drem Rud (c. 500)
- Melar (c. 500s)
- Budic II (c. 545)
- Macliau (544–577)
- Judicael (c. 857 – c. 874) – in this period the borders of Cornouaille were not precisely defined. Its leaders represented the interests of "western Brittany" and joined the King of Brittany in fights against the Vikings.
- Riwallon (c. 874)
- Gourmaëlon (early 10th century)
- Alan II (early to mid-10th century)
- Alain Canhiart
- Hoel of Cornouaille, who ruled Brittany as Duke jure uxoris
- Alan IV
