= Thar (river) =

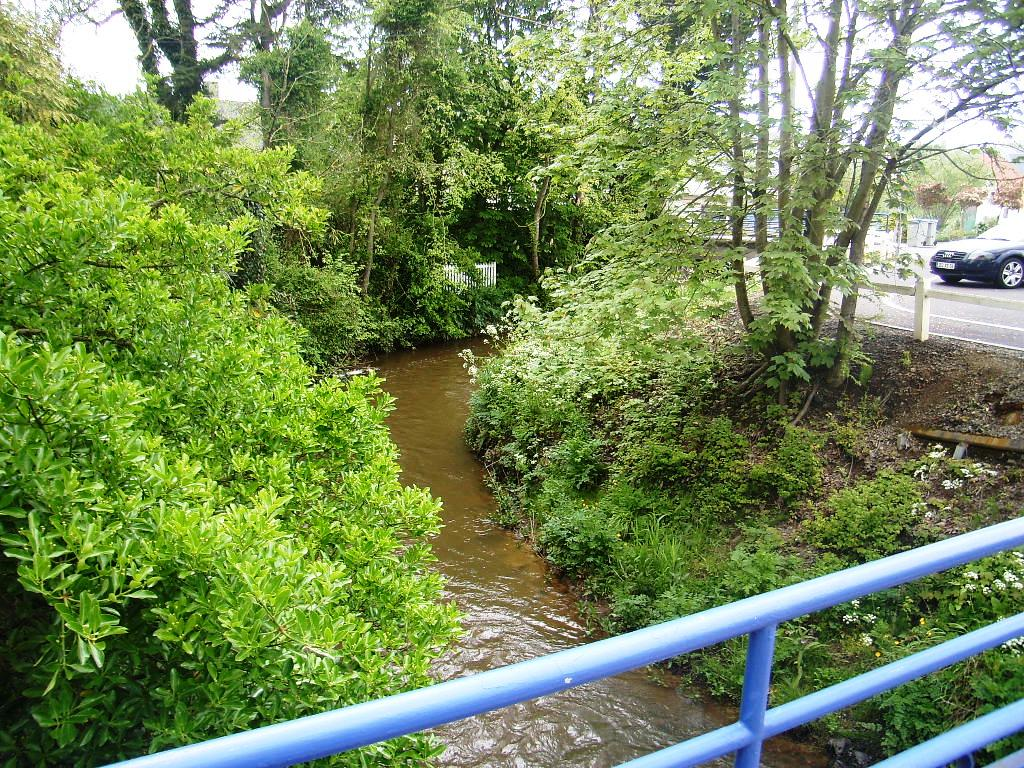
- The Thar at Jullouville

- Location within France Location within Normandy

Location
- Country: France

Physical characteristics
- Mouth: English Channel
  - coordinates: 48.8046°N 1.5702°W
- Length: 24.8 km (15.4 mi)

The Thar is a small river of France, in the administrative region Normandie, département de la Manche. It is 24.8 km (15 mi) long, rising to the east of La Haye-Pesnel and emptying into the Bay of Mont Saint-Michel, in the English Channel.

In the Middle Ages the Thar formed the traditional boundary between the Cotentin to the north and the Avranchin to the south.
