= Château d'Ancenis =

Castle in France

Coordinates: 47°21′52″N 1°10′36″W

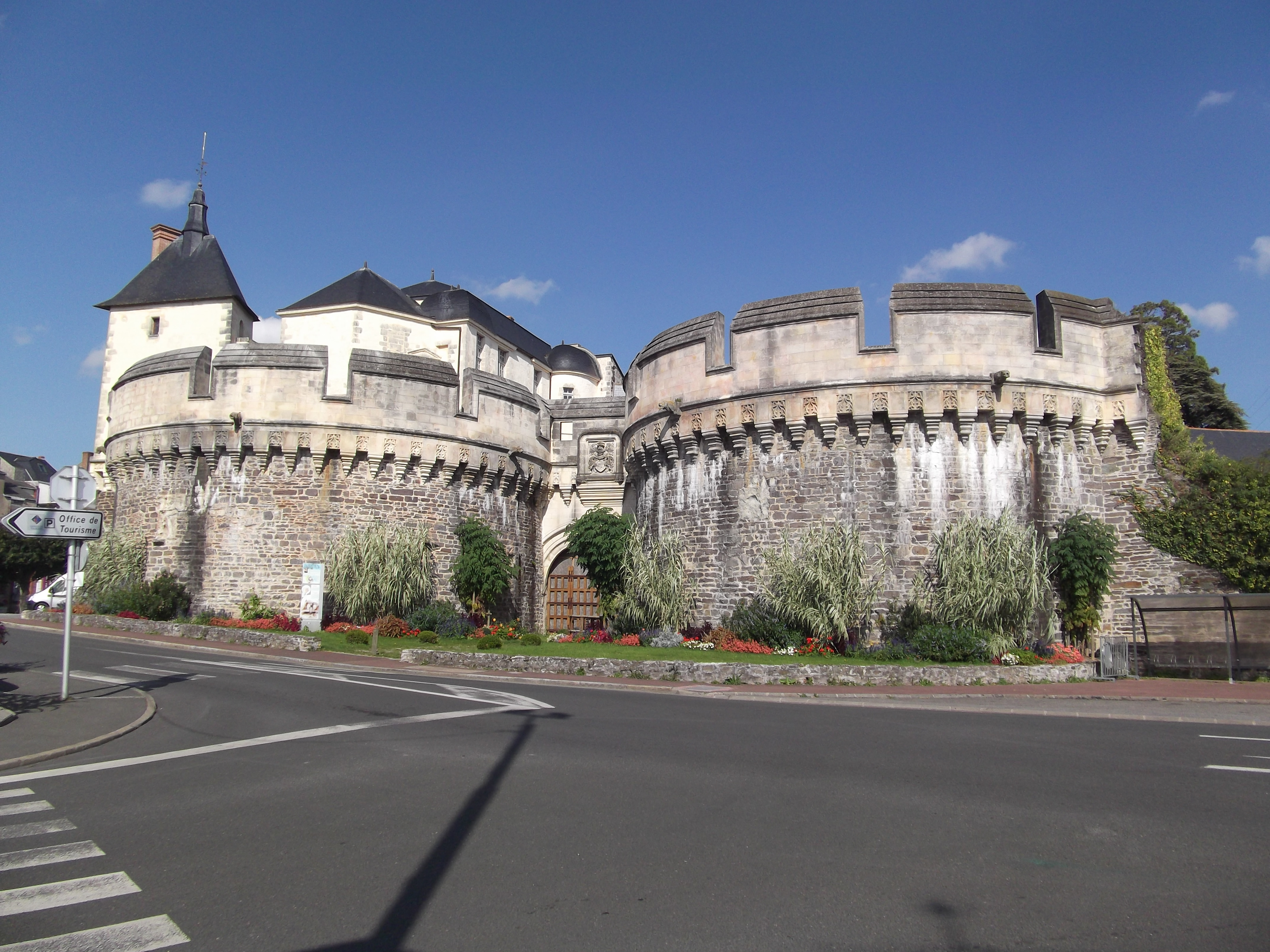
The castle entrance

The Château d'Ancenis is a castle in the town and commune of Ancenis in the Loire-Atlantique département of France. The castle is on the bank of the Loire.

== History ==
The original castle was built in 990 by Aremburga of Ancenis, widow of Guerech, Duke of Brittany, as a motte-and-bailey castle. (A plaque on the castle names Guerech as the constructor, in 984. This is not supported in any documentary sources.) It had simple defences including a moat and a palisade with an enclosure to shelter the population.

Owing to its location, it rapidly developed as an ideal place for surveillance of the river, exercising military and economic control. In 1411, the lord and lady of Ancenis were ordered by the authorities to cease detaining boats that passed the castle and extracting punitive tolls on their cargoes.

Its strategic position meant that it was subjected to several sieges between the 12th and 16th centuries, by the English kings Henry II and John, the French kings Louis IX, Louis XI and François II, Charles, Duke of Brittany and, on the orders of King Charles VIII, Louis II de la Trémoille. Charles VIII ordered the demolition of the castle. In 1488, he wrote to de la Trémoille and his lieutenants forbidding them to allow their workers any holiday until the demolition was complete. Excavations in the 1950s discovered cannon balls as evidence of the sieges of the castle.

From the 17th century, the military role of the castle dwindled. It was dismantled by order of Cardinal Richelieu in 1626. Sections of curtain walls and towers were disfigured or removed. The moats were filled with the construction of wharves in 1840 and the establishment of an Ursuline boarding school in 1850, continued the damage.

== Description ==
The gatehouse, built at the end of the 14th and the beginning of the 16th century, has a unique defensive device: a drawbridge arranged in a chicane and a crooked arched gallery with a portcullis. The Renaissance home, a residential project started by Claude 1 de Rieux and his wife Suzanne de Bourbon, was built around 1529. Its facade, on the courtyard side, has decor of the first Renaissance, while the structure of the house remains Gothic.

== Preservation ==
It has been listed since 1977 as a monument historique by the French Ministry of Culture. This protection concerns the entirety of the fortifications, as well as the façades and roof of the buildings (Renaissance house, former chapel and a dwelling called "logis de Marie Fouquet"). It became the property of the town in 1986. In the 1990s, work was undertaken to demolish the 19th century chapel and the 1960s school building and to restore the gatehouse. Between 2013 and 2015, the Renaissance house was repaired, with the structure strengthened and entrances reopened.

== See also ==
- List of castles in France
