= Ridoredh =

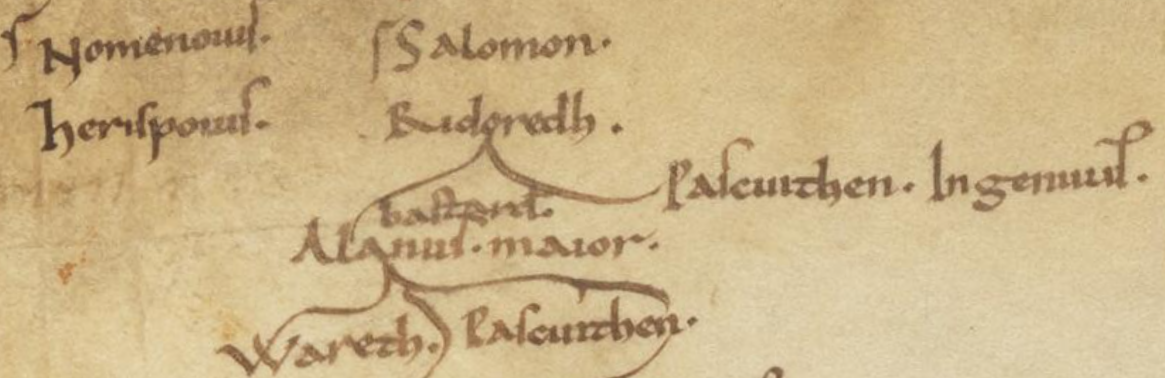
Ridoredh and his sons in the Saint-Aubin family tree

Ridoredh was the count of Vannes in the ninth century. According to a family tree added to a manuscript of the Abbey of Saint-Aubin around the year 1100, he was the father of two Breton kings: Pascweten, who was nobly born (Latin ingenuus), and Alan the Great, who was illegitimate (bastardus). The manuscript is now Reg. lat. 1283 in the Vatican Library.
