= Gurvand =

Duke of Brittany from 874 to 876

Wrhwant, Gurwant, Gurwent or Gurvand (Latin: Vurfandus) (died 876) was a claimant to the Kingdom of Brittany from 874 until his death in opposition to Pascweten, Count of Vannes.

Wrhwant was complicit in the conspiracy which assassinated Salomon in 874. However, he was of the faction which had been outside Salomon's court and he hailed from northwest Brittany. He was, however, never styled "Count". He mustered 200 men to fight the Vikings in 874. After Salomon's death, he and Pascweten divided the country between them, though Regino of Prüm records that the latter received a larger share. The two soon fell out and fought over the succession. He had died by the middle of 876 and his son Judicael had taken up his role.

His wife was a daughter of Erispoe, and in some reconstructed genealogies their one daughter was married to Berengar of Rennes.

- unknown daughter, married to Berengar of Rennes, Count of Rennes, whose son and successor, according to one popular solution, was Judicael Berengar.
- Judicael
- Oreguen(?)

== See also ==
- Dukes of Brittany family tree

== Sources ==
- Smith, Julia M. H. Province and Empire: Brittany and the Carolingians. Cambridge University Press: 1992.

== Notes ==
Regnal titles
Preceded by Salomon	Duke of Brittany disputed with Pasquitan; 874–876	Succeeded by Judicael and Alan I
Preceded by -	Count of Rennes ?–876	Succeeded by Judicael
