= County of Nantes =

The counts of Nantes were originally the Frankish rulers of the Nantais under the Carolingians and eventually a capital city of the Duchy of Brittany. Their county served as a march against the Bretons of the Vannetais. Carolingian rulers would sometimes attack Brittany through the region of the Vannetais, making Nantes a strategic asset. In the mid-ninth century, the county finally fell to the Bretons and the title became a subsidiary title of the Breton rulers. The control of the title by the Breton dukes figured prominently in the history of the duchy. The County of Nantes was given to Hoel, a disinherited son of a duke. He lost the countship due to a popular uprising. That uprising presented an opportunity for King Henry II of England to attack the Breton duke. In the treaty ending their conflicts, the Breton duke awarded the county to Henry II.

== Frankish counts ==
- ---- – 778 Roland, as prefect of the Breton March - subject of the Chanson de Roland
- 786 – 818 Guy, as prefect of the Breton March, successor to Roland
- 818 – 831 Lambert I - exiled by Louis the Pious and replaced by Ricwin.
- 831 – 841 Ricwin -a comes of Charlemagne, and fidelis of Louis the Pious, he opposed Nominoe in the founding of Redon Abbey
- 841 – 843 Renaud
- 843 – 846 Lambert II
- 846 – 849 Amaury, imposed by Charles the Bald in opposition to Lambert II
- 849 – 851 Lambert II (restored)
- 852 – 860 Salomon
- 861 – 866 Robert the Strong, also Count of Anjou
- 866 – --- Hugh of the Breton March
- --- – --- Henry of the Breton March
- --- – --- Odo, the future Odo, King of West Francia, as the Marquis of Neustria
- 886 – 896 Berengar II of Neustria as Margrave of the Breton March, later also Count of Rennes
- 896 – 911
- 911 – --- Robert, the future Robert I of France as the Marquis of Neustria

== Kingdom of Brittany ==
Alan I, King of Brittany ruled Nantes as King of Brittany until his death in 907.

== Norse occupation from 914 to 938 ==
- 907 - c 914 - vacant

=== Rognvaldr also known as Ragenold ===
- 914 - 919 - Rognvaldr as a leader of the Loire Raiding Fleet lands in Nantes; King Gourmaelon killed in battle, King Robert of Neustria continues conflict with invading Norse.
- 919 - Robert cedes Nantes to Rognvaldr who renames it Namsborg, makes peace and agrees to convert to Christianity for being allowed to keep Brittany.
- 924 - Rognvaldr ravages the lands between the Seine and the Loire and then Burgundy but is finally defeated at Chalmont.
- 927 - The Franks launch another failed attempt to retake Nantes.
- 930 - Rognvaldr reigns until his death.

=== Hakom Rognvaldrsson also known as Incon ===
- 930 - Hakon Rognvaldrsson, known to the Franks as Incon, Norse leader after the death of Rognvaldr, King Rudolph of the Franks defeats Incon at Estress that same year.
- 931 - Breton peasant revolt broken and their leader Felecan killed.
- 935 - Incon isolated after William 1 Longsword of Normandy reconciles with the Franks and exiled Bretons start returning from Britain.
- 936 - 938 - Alan Barbetorte returns to Brittany from England and engages the Norse, Incon slain at recapture of Nantes in 937.

== Later counts ==
- 938 – 952 Alan I Barbetorte, grandson of Alan I, King of Brittany, also Duke of Brittany
- 952 – 960 Drogo, his son
- 960 – 981 Hoël I, Alan Barbetorte's eldest illegitimate son
- 981 – c.988 Guerech, Hoël's brother
- 990 – 992 Conan I, Count of Nantes by conquest
- 992 – 1004 Judicaël; Hoël's illegitimate son
- 1004 – 1038 : Budic, Judicael's son
- 1038 – 1051 : Matthew I, Burdic's son
- 1051 – 1063 : Judith, Matthew's aunt and Budic's sister, (with her husband Alain Canhiart)
- 1054 – 1084 : Hoël II, their son, married to Hawise, Duchess of Brittany
- 1084 – 1103 : Matthew II, Hoël and Hawise's second son
- 1103 – 1119 Alan II, Matthew's elder brother, also Duke of Brittany
- 1119 – 1148 Conan II, Alan's son
- 1148– 1156 Hoël III, Conan's son
- 1156 – 1158 Geoffrey I FitzEmpress, younger brother of Henry II of England
- 1158 Conan III, Hoël III's nephew, seized the County and Nantes before returning it to Henry of England
- 1158 – 1185 Henry II of England, gained the county under his treaty with the Duke of Brittany
- 1185 (Note: "Geoffrey (...) seems to have finally acquired the county of Nantes from Henry II in 1185", see Judith Everard and Michael Jones, The Charters of Duchess Constance of Brittany and Her Family (1171-1221), p 1) – 1186 Geoffrey II, Henry II's fourth son, married to Conan's daughter Constance
- 1185 – 1201 Constance, Conan's daughter and heiress, married to Henry II's son Geoffrey
- 1196 – 1203 Arthur, their son

The County of Nantes was merged permanently into the Ducal crown of Brittany, and subsequently the crown of France, through Constance's descendants.
