= Alan IV of Brittany =

Duke of Brittany from 1072 to 1112

Alan IV
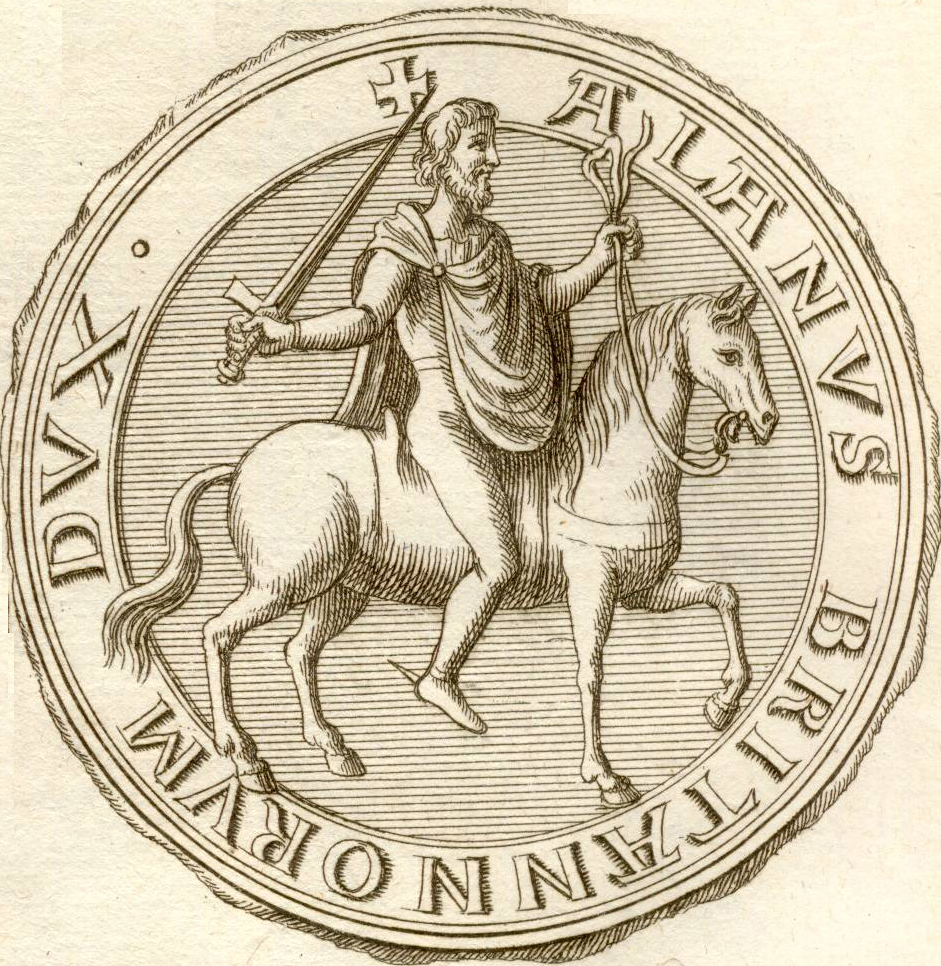
- Alan IV's seal

Duke of Brittany
- Reign: 1072–1112
- Predecessor: Hoël II & Hawise
- Successor: Conan III
- Regent: Hoël II (1072–1084)
- Born: c. 1063
- Died: 13 October 1119; Redon Abbey
- Burial: Redon Abbey
- Spouses: Constance of Normandy (m. 1086; died 1090) Ermengarde of Anjou (m. 1093)
- Issue: Conan III, Duke of Brittany; Geoffrey; Hawise, Countess of Flanders; Brian Fitz Count (Illegitimate)
- House: Cornouaille
- Father: Hoël of Cornouaille
- Mother: Hawise, Duchess of Brittany

Alan IV (c. 1063 – 13 October 1119) was Duke of Brittany from 1072 until his abdication in 1112. He was also Count of Nantes (from c. 1103) and Count of Rennes. His parents were Duchess Hawise and Duke Hoel II. He is also known as Alan Fergant. Through his father, he was of the Breton House of Cornouaille dynasty (Breton: Kerne dynasty). He was the last Breton-speaking Duke of Brittany.

== Conflict with Normandy ==
A traditional rivalry between Brittany and Normandy continued at the close of the 11th century. The Breton-Norman war of 1064–1065 was the result of William the Bastard, Duke of Normandy (later to become known as William the Conqueror) support of rebels in Brittany against Alan's maternal uncle, Conan II.

Conan II died in late 1066 during a campaign in Anjou, and was succeeded by Alan's parents, Hawise and Hoël II. When Hawise died in 1072, Alan became duke, but as he was a minor, Hoël ruled as regent until Alan reached his majority in 1084. (Note: Following medieval examples given in Bailey et al., Alan may have been twenty-one years of age at that time.)

To prevent further hostilities during his invasion of England, William I married his daughter Constance to the new duke Alan in 1087. The marriage ceremonies may have taken place in Bayeux in Normandy. William of Malmesbury wrote that Constance was unpopular at the Breton court because of her "severe and conservative" manner. However, Orderic Vitalis wrote that as duchess Constance did all she could to further the welfare of the Bretons, who grieved deeply at her death in 1090.

In 1092, Alan IV donated property to the abbey of Redon by charter, and by 1093 married Ermengarde of Anjou, as a political alliance with Fulk IV of Anjou to counter Anglo-Norman influence.

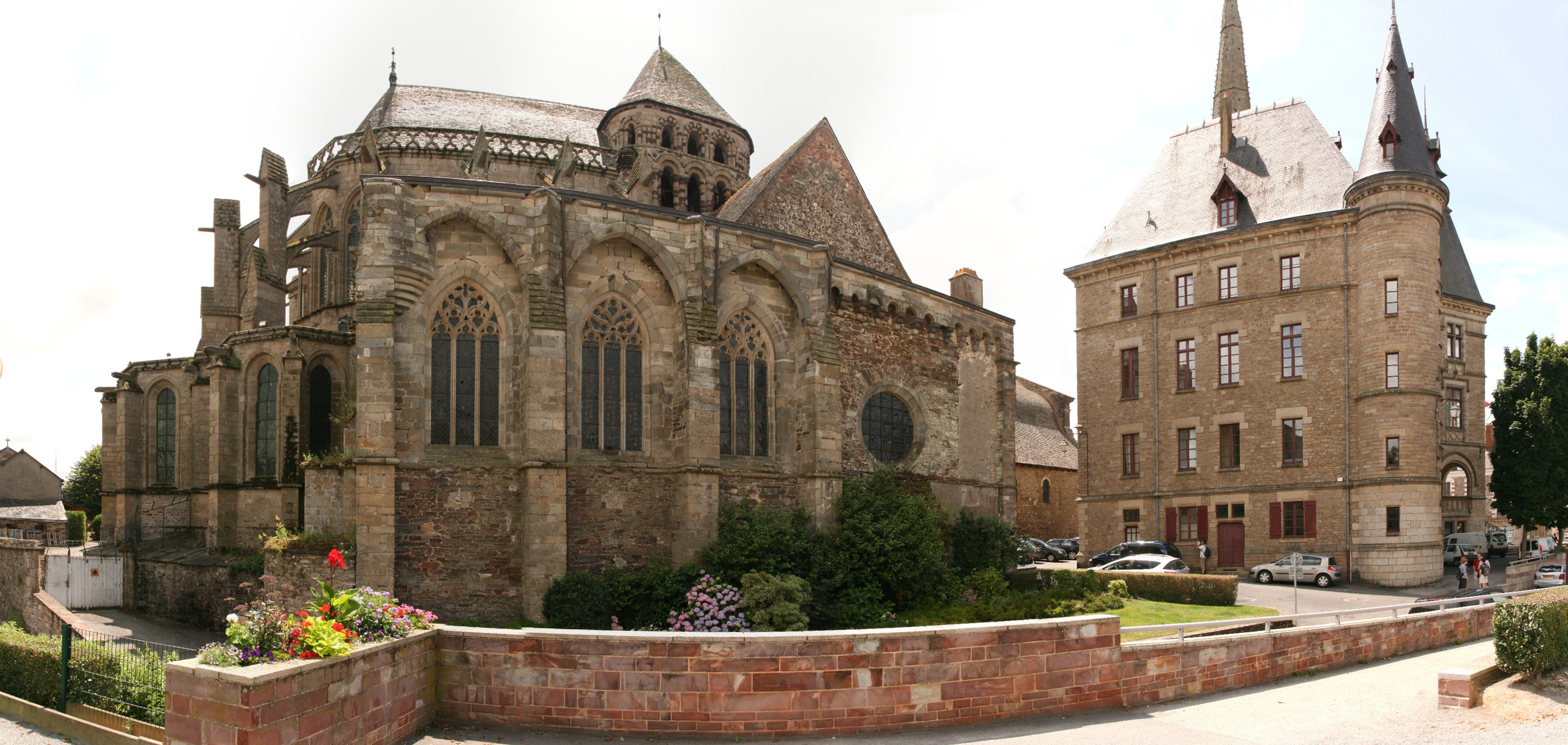
Redon Abbey in Brittany, the final resting place of Alan IV

Duke Alan IV's cousin Geoffrey I Boterel (eldest brother of Alan Rufus) died on 24 August 1093 in battle at Dol while in rebellion against the Duke.

Alan heeded the call of Pope Urban II and joined the First Crusade. While he was away, from 1096 to 1101, Brittany was ruled by his second wife, Ermengarde of Anjou.

Between 1101 and 1104, Alan's younger brother, Count Matthew II of Nantes, died without issue and his county passed to Alan.

Alan IV abdicated as duke in 1112. The former duke retired to the monastery of Redon, where he died in 1119.

== Crusader ==
In 1098 Alan went on the First Crusade, as part of the army of Robert Curthose, leaving Ermengarde as his regent, and returned in 1101.

== Family ==
Alan IV married Constance of Normandy, the daughter of William I of England, in 1087. Constance died in 1090. William of Malmesbury alleges that her husband, Alan, had their servants poison her. They had no children.

Alan's second marriage was to Ermengarde of Anjou in 1093. With Ermengarde he had three children:

- Geoffrey - died young;
- Conan - his successor as Duke of Brittany
- Hawise - she married Count Baldwin VII of Flanders, also known as Hawise Fergant. They divorced and had no issue.

Alan and Ermengarde were separated upon his abdication as duke in 1112.

He had two illegitimate sons:

- Brian Fitzcount - held the lordships of Wallingford and Abergavenny. Was a favourite of Henry I of England, and a staunch supporter of his daughter, the Empress Matilda, during the Anarchy (1135–1153).
- Guihomar

== Succession ==
Alan IV died in 1119 at the monastery of Redon, where he had retired after his abdication in 1112, and separation from his wife Ermengarde. His only surviving son, Conan III succeeded him.

== See also ==
- Dukes of Brittany family tree

== Sources ==
- Bailey, B. Gregory; Bernard, Meaghan E.; Carrier, Gregory; Elliott, Cherise L.; Langdon, John; Leishman, Natalie; Mlynarz, Michal; Mykhed, Oksana; Sidders, Lindsay C. (2008). "Coming of Age and the Family in Medieval England". Journal of Family History. 33 (1). SAGE: 41–60. doi:10.1177/03631990073084492008.
- Everard, J. A. (2004). Brittany and the Angevins: Province and Empire 1158–1203. Cambridge University Press.
- Panton, James (2011). Historical Dictionary of the British Monarchy. Scarecrow Press. ISBN 0810874970.
- Piette, Gwenno (2008). A Concise History of Brittany. University of Wales Press.
- Warren, W. L. (1974). Henry II. University of California Press.

Alan IV of Brittany House of Cornouaille Died: 13 October 1119
Regnal titles
Preceded by Hoel II	Duke of Brittany; 1072–1112	Succeeded by Conan III
Preceded by Geoffrey I	Count of Rennes; 1072–1112	Succeeded by Conan III
Preceded by Matthew II	Count of Nantes; 1103–1112	Succeeded by Conan III
