= Hawise of Brittany =

Duchess of Brittany from 1066 to 1072

Hawise of Rennes (Breton: Hawiz Breizh; French: Havoise de Bretagne) (c. 1024-1037 – 19 August 1072) was Duchess of Brittany from 1066 until her death.

Hawise was daughter and heiress of Alan III, Duke of Brittany, by his wife, Bertha of Blois, and as such, a member of the House of Rennes. She had two siblings: Conan II and Emma of Brittany. Hawise succeeded her older brother Conan, who was assassinated by poisoning on 11 December 1066.

Little is known of the life of Hawise of Rennes. She was married to Hoël of Cornwall some time before 1058. Hoel exercised authority jure uxoris and continued to control the government after her death in 1072 acting as regent for their son, Alan IV.

== Family ==
Hawise married Hoel of Cornwall. They had:

- Orwen de Cornouailles (1050–1103)
- Hildeberge de Cornouaille (1067–1095)
- Alain IV Fergant de Cornouaille, (circa 1067 – October 19, 1119) Duke of Brittany, Count of Rennes, Count of Nantes
- Matthew, inherited the county of Nantes.

== Sources ==
- Jean-Christophe Cassard, Houel Huuel : comte de Cornouaille puis duc de Bretagne (c. 1030–1084), t. CXVII, Société archéologique du Finistère, Quimper, 1988 (ISSN 0249-6763), pp. 95–117
- Everard, J. A. (2004). Brittany and the Angevins: Province and Empire 1158–1203. Cambridge University Press.
- Keats-Rohan, K.S.B. (1992). "The Bretons and Normans of England 1066–1154: the Family, the Fief and the Feudal Monarchy". Nottingham Medieval Studies. 36(Jan). Brepols.

Hawise of Brittany House of Rennes Born: 1036 Died: 19 August 1072
Regnal titles
Preceded by Conan II	Duchess of Brittany; 1066–1072 with Hoel II	Succeeded by Alan IV
