= Domnonée =

Bretons who fled Saxon-conquered England to France

Kingdom of Domnonée Domnonea
- c. 5th century–9th century
- Status: Kingdom
- Capital: Dol-de-Bretagne (traditional)
- Other languages: Old Breton, Latin
- Religion: Celtic Christianity
- Government: Monarchy
- Historical era: Early Middle Ages
  - Migration of Britons from Dumnonia: c. 5th century
  - Integration into the Kingdom of Brittany: 9th century
Preceded by	Succeeded by
Sub-Roman Britain	Kingdom of Brittany
- Today part of: France — Brittany

Domnonée is the modern French form of Domnonia or Dumnonia (Latin for "Devon"; Breton: Domnonea, Devnon), a historic kingdom in northern Armorica (modern Brittany). It was founded by British immigrants from Dumnonia in Sub-Roman Britain who fled the Saxon invasions of Britain in the early Middle Ages. Headed by the same ruling dynasty, Domnonée was at times separate from, and at other times united with, its British motherland, and the Latin name Domnonia was applied to both regions interchangeably. On the continent, Domnonée encompassed the areas of Trégor, Dol-de-Bretagne, Goélo, Saint-Malo , Léon and Penthièvre.

== History ==
At the time of the Roman conquest of Gaul, the rough area of later Domnonée was held by the pagan Curiosolite Gauls. Domnonée is said to have been founded in the 4th century by Christian Briton immigrants; it greatly expanded in the wake of subsequent waves of refugees from the Saxon invasions of Britain. Domnonée retained close political links between the Celtic territories in Great Britain (Wales, Cornwall, Devon), and the newly created Brittany. Many kings, princes, clerics and other leaders came over from Great Britain. The sea was a unifying rather than divisive factor. In the traditions relating to the settlement of Brittany by the Bretons there are several kingdoms of this kind. A number of legends and lives of Breton saints contain references to the close political ties between religious communities in Wales and Brittany. The close proximity resulted in possessions on both sides of the Channel by some religious orders. For example, the Abbey of Notre-Dame de Beauport, before Henry VIII, had parishes on the coast of Goélo and in Devon.

It has been suggested that the British and Breton branches were unified for a period. Conomor, who was killed fighting Chlothar I, king of the Franks, is referred to in stories from both Great Britain and Brittany. He would have been a British military leader who was guarding the English Channel from attacks by pirates, perhaps in alliance with Childebert I, son of Clovis I.

In 1034, the term was used to designate the comté of Penthièvre said to be the preserve of Eudes, second son of Geoffrey I, Duke of Brittany. The name disappeared shortly after.

== History of the Principality of Dumnonia or Domnonée ¹ ==
Situated to the north-east of Brittany, the earliest princes are mentioned in several Lives of the Saints. The three Armorican principalities were all subservient to the King of Brittany. Until the reign of Jonas, the rulers of Domnonia were titled princes. After that, they supplied the Kings of the Bretons, and Domnonia itself was elevated as a result.

== List of rulers ==
- St. Fracan
- Riwal I.
- Conan
- ?–513: Conothec
- 513–520: Riwal II, brother of Saint Pompeia of Langoat
- 520–530: Deroch
- 530–535: Riathen
- 535–540: Jonas
- 540: St. Judual
- 540-554: Conomor, regent and usurper
- 554–580: St. Judual (again)
- 580–605: St. Judhael
- 605–610: Judicaël († 652)
- 610–615: Haeloch
- 615–640: Judicael (again; † 652)
