= Gourmaëlon =

Gourmaëlon or Wrmaelon (died 913/4), was the Count of Cornouaille and de facto ruler of Brittany from 907 – c. 914. As ruler of Brittany he was considered Prince de Bretagne in some chronicles and histories. His actual history is among the least well documented of the early medieval rulers of Brittany. His reputed time of rule coincides with a dramatic increase in Viking invasions that ultimately led up to the Viking Occupation of Brittany that began after his death.

He is believed to have been named Count of Cornouaille by Alan I, King of Brittany near the end of his reign in 907. (Note: In the Cartulaire de Landévennec, Uurmaelon comes Cornubia) After Alan I's death in 907 he disputed the right of Alan's heirs to rule Brittany and fought for the control of the kingdom, albeit without claiming the title king. (Note: According to Poisson and Le Mat, his self proclaimed authority was considered more nominal than real (« autorité plus nominale que réelle »))

His life and activities are sparsely recorded in historical documents save for several donations to the Breton churches of the day. In a donation to the monastery of Plélan in 910 he is identified as "ruler of Brittany". (Note: In the Cartulaire de Redon (910), « Gurmahilon regnante Britanniam ») At Redon in 913 he is identified as Count Gourmaelon, the Breton monarch. (Note: In the Cartulaire de Redon (913) « Gurmahilon comitem qui tunc monarchiam Britanniae regebat »)

He is understood to have died in 913 (or 914) in a battle with invading Vikings. (Note: entrée dans le Manuscrit 476 de la bibliothèque d’Angers dit Anecdota novissima :« Anno DCCCCXIII Guuormaelon oc[cissus est] ».)

No subsequent ruler of Brittany is recorded in histories or chronicles of the period until the return of Alan II, Duke of Brittany, known as Alan Barbetorte, from England c. 937–938.

== Bibliography ==
- Poisson, Henri; Le Mat, Jean-Pierre (2000). Histoire de Bretagne (Second ed.). Coop Breizh. ISBN 978-2-84346-091-3.
- Cartulaire de Landévennec Chartre XXIV De Aeccleia Sanctus.
- Cartulaire de Redon Chartre CCLXXIX du 27 novembre 910.
- Cartulaire de Redon Chartre CCLXXVI du 25 octobre 913.
- Price, Neil S. (1989). The Vikings in Brittany. Saga-Book XXII 6. ISBN 978-0-903521-22-2.

Regnal titles
Preceded by Alan I	King of Brittany ruled de facto without title 908–913	Succeeded by Viking Occupation next holder Alan II
Preceded by Riwallon	Count of Cornouaille; 907–913	Succeeded by Viking Occupation next holder Alan II
