= Pascweten =

Duke of Brittany from 874 to 876

Pascweten (died 876) was the count of Vannes and a claimant to the rule of Brittany. He was a son of Ridoredh of Vannes, a prominent and wealthy aristocrat first associated with the court of Erispoe in the 850s. He owned vast landed estates and salt works (as at Guérande) in southeastern Brittany and was a patron of Redon Abbey.

Pascweten was a son-in-law of Salomon, Duke of Brittany, in August 867, when he negotiated a lasting peace at Compiègne with Charles the Bald on behalf of his father-in-law and prevented the king from marching on Brittany. Pascweten swore an oath of fidelity to Charles on Salomon's behalf.

In 874 Pascweten, Wrhwant, and Wigo, son of Riwallon, Count of Cornouaille, conspired against Salomon and assassinated him, but since each hailed from a different regional party, they soon found themselves at odds with Salomon gone. Pascweten and Wrhwant fought over the succession to Breton rule for the next two years. They divided the country between them, though Regino of Prüm records that the latter received a larger share. By mid 876 both were dead and Pascweten's brother, Alan the Great, had succeeded him in Vannes and carried on the fight against Judicael of Cornouaille.

== See also ==
- Kings and dukes of Brittany family tree

== Sources ==
- Smith, Julia M. H. Province and Empire: Brittany and the Carolingians. Cambridge University Press: 1992.

== Notes ==
Regnal titles
Preceded by Salomon	Duke of Brittany disputed with Gurvand; 874–876	Succeeded by Judicael and Alan I
Preceded by Ridoredh	Count of Vannes ? - 876	Succeeded by Alan I
