= Questembert =

Questembert Kistreberzh
- Commune
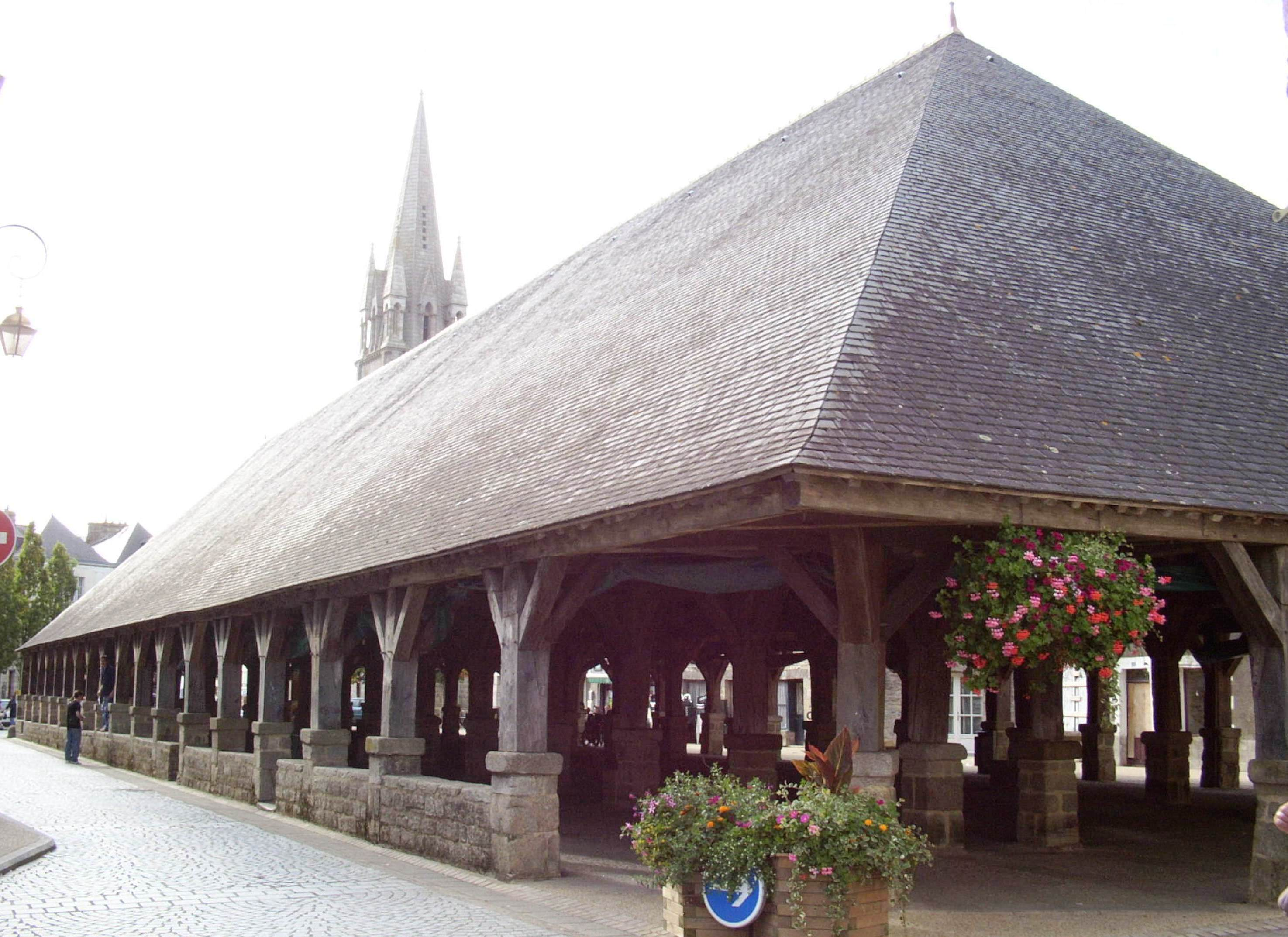
- Covered market

- Coat of arms
- Location of Questembert
- Location within France Location within Brittany
- Coordinates: 47.662°N 2.452°W
- Country: France
- Region: Brittany
- Department: Morbihan
- Arrondissement: Vannes
- Canton: Questembert
- Intercommunality: Questembert Communauté

Government
  - Mayor (2026–32): Boris Lemaire
- Area^{1}: 66.38 km^{2} (25.63 sq mi)
- Elevation: 100 m (330 ft)
- Highest elevation: 128 m (420 ft)
- Lowest elevation: 27 m (89 ft)
- Population (2023): 8,133
  - Density: 122.5/km^{2} (317.3/sq mi)
- Time zone: UTC+01:00 (CET)
  - Summer (DST): UTC+02:00 (CEST)
- INSEE/Postal code: 56184 /56230
- ^{1} French Land Register data, which excludes lakes, ponds, glaciers > 1 km^{2} (0.386 sq mi or 247 acres) and river estuaries.

Questembert (French pronunciation: [kɛstɑ̃bɛʁ]; Breton: Kistreberzh) is a commune in the Morbihan department in Brittany in north-western France.

It is located approximately 25 km (16 mi) from Vannes.

== Demographics ==
Inhabitants of Questembert are called Questembertois in French.

Historical population
Year	Pop.	±% p.a.
1968	4,209	—
1975	4,661	+1.47%
1982	4,961	+0.90%
1990	5,076	+0.29%
1999	5,727	+1.35%
2007	6,720	+2.02%
2012	7,449	+2.08%
2017	7,585	+0.36%
2023	8,133	+1.17%
Source: INSEE

== Breton language ==
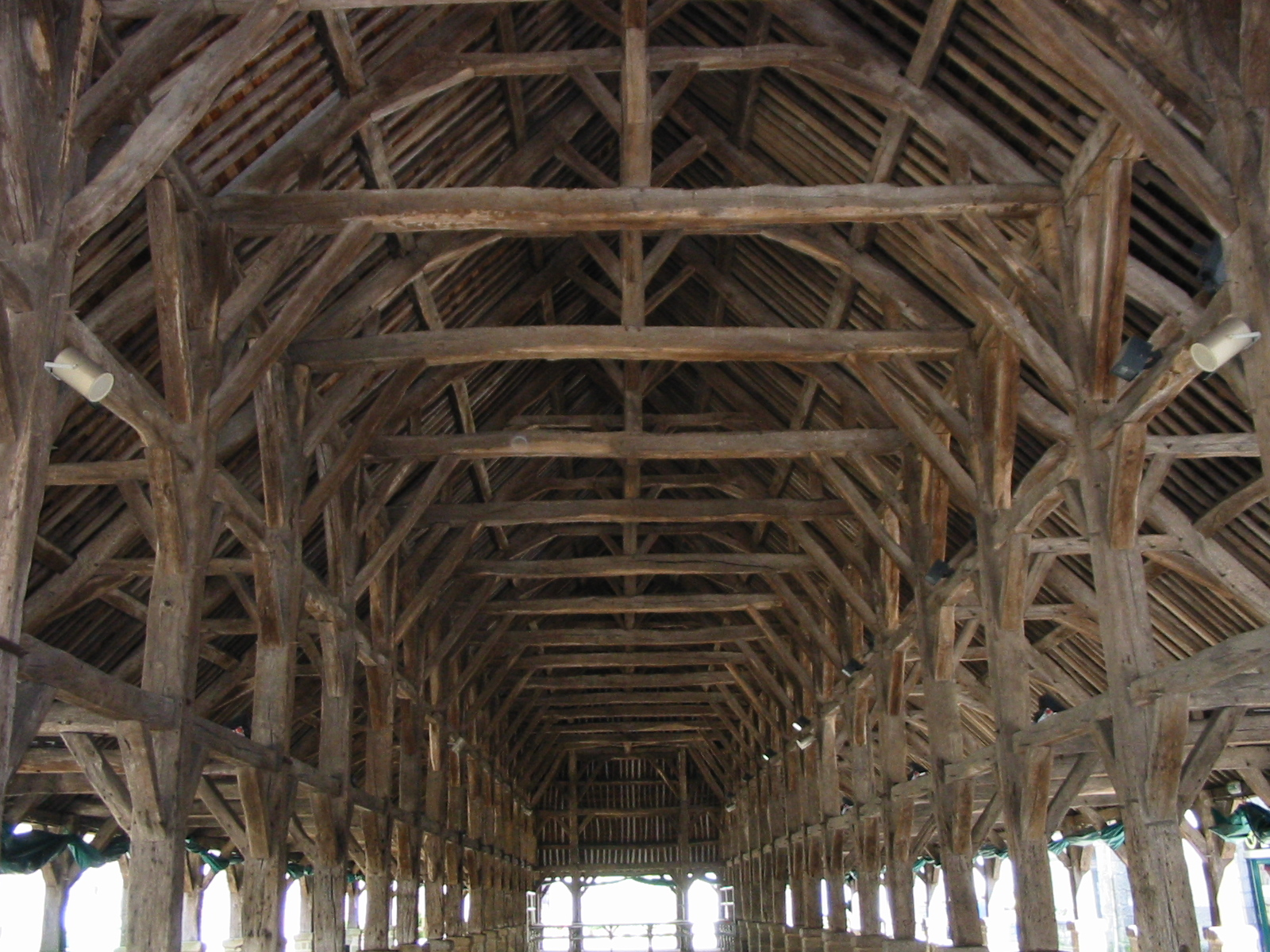
Inside covered market

In 2008, 3.61% of local children attended bilingual schools in primary education, learning partly in Breton.

== See also ==
- Communes of the Morbihan department
