= Count of Rennes =

The Count of Rennes was originally the ruler of the Romano-Frankish civitas of Rennes. From the middle of the ninth century these counts were Bretons with close ties to the Duchy of Brittany, which they often vied to rule. From 990 the Counts of Rennes were usually Dukes of Brittany. In 1203 the county was integrated into the ducal demesne. The Count of Rennes was a title held by the House of Rennes.

- ???–876 Gurwant, also Duke from 874
- 876–888 Judicael
- 888–896 Berengar II of Neustria
- 896–903 unknown
- 903–953 Judicael Berengar
- 958–992 Conan I the Crooked, also Duke from 990
- 992–1008 Geoffrey I, also Duke
- 1008–1040 Alan I, also Duke; granted the Countship of Penthievre to his brother Eudes, thereby founding the Cadet Branch of the House of Rennes. Ruled with Odo, Count of Penthièvre until 1035.
- 1040–1066 Conan II, also Duke
- 1066–1082 Geoffrey II Grenonat
- 1066–1072 Hawise (in opposition to Geoffrey II), also Duchess
- 1072–1084 Hoel I (in opposition to Geoffrey II from 1066), also Duke from 1066
- 1084–1112 Alan II Fergant, also Duke
- 1112–1148 Conan III the Fat, also Duke
- 1148–1156 Hoel II
- 1156–1166 Conan IV the Young, also Duke until 1166
- 1166–1181 Henry Curtmantle, as guardian of Constance
- 1181–1186 Geoffrey III, Count of Rennes and Duke of Brittany jure uxoris as Geoffrey II
- 1166–1201 Constance, also Duchess from 1166
- 1196–1203 Arthur, also Duke

The County of Rennes was merged into the Ducal crown of Brittany, and subsequently the crown of France, through Constance's descendants.

== Sources ==
- Comté de Rennes
