= Matthew I of Nantes =

Matthew I (or Matthias I, died 1050 or 1051) was the Count of Nantes from 1038 until his death. He was the eldest son of Count Budic of Nantes.

Around 1040, Walter, bishop of Nantes, arranged for his son, Budic, to succeed him as bishop. They then obtained consent to their illegal scheme from the councillors of Count Matthew, who was still a minor, by buying them off with silver. In 1049, the Council of Reims deposed Budic and replaced him with Airard. Matthew was one of the recipients of the letter addressed by Pope Leo IX to the princes of Brittany explaining the council's actions. The deposition of Budic is the last event recorded in the Chronicle of Nantes. The Chronicle goes on to say that afterwards Budic and Matthew were "inseparable until death" (connexa ... usque ad finem vitae). Within two years of the Council of Reims, both ex-bishop and count were dead.

Matthew was succeeded by his aunt, Judith, and her husband Alain Canhiart.
