= Salomon of Brittany =

Duke/King of Brittany from 857 to 874

Solomon III
- King of Brittany

Duke of Brittany
- Reign: 857-874
- Predecessor: Erispoe
- Successor: Pascweten and Gurvand
- Died: 874
- Father: Riwallon III of Poher

Saint Salomon, King of Brittany
- Died: 874
- Venerated in: Catholic Church
- Feast: June 25

Salomon (Breton: Salaün) (died 874) was count of Rennes and Nantes from 852 and duke of Brittany from 857 until his assassination in 874. In 867, he was granted the counties of Avranches and Coutances, and he used the title king of Brittany intermittently after 868.

In popular tradition within Brittany he was canonised as "Saint Salomon" after his death and raised to the rank of martyr.

== Rise under Erispoe ==
Salomon was the son of Riwallon III of Poher, who himself was the son of Count Erispoë I of Poher, King of the Browaroch (775–812), and older brother of Nominoe. In 851, Charles the Bald, after his defeat at the Battle of Jengland, made peace with Salomon's cousin Erispoe, son of Nominoe, and granted him the counties of Rennes and Nantes and the Pays de Retz in Poitou as far as the river Mayenne. In 852, Salomon swore an oath to Charles and became his loyal follower (fidelis); in return, in a manner similar to Erispoe, he was granted Rennes, Nantes, and Retz as a "third" of Brittany to be held from Charles in fee. He and Erispoe were the dominatores of Rennes in 853. Salomon was the most powerful aristocrat at Erispoe's court.

== Revolt of 858–863 ==
Probably because he feared losing his benefices (which he held under Erispoe) if Louis the Stammerer were allowed to become king at Le Mans, Salomon colluded with the otherwise unknown Almarchus to assassinate his cousin Erispoe and seize the Breton throne in 857. In 858, he was behind the large-scale revolt of the Frankish nobles of Neustria against Charles the Bald. Bretons were involved in the chasing of Louis from Le Mans in the spring of that year. In September, Louis the German marched as far as Orléans, where a Breton delegation from Salomon met him and took oaths on Salomon's behalf. In 859, a synod met at Savonnières near Toul and tried to order Salomon to remember his oath of 852 and to resume paying the tribute which Brittany had paid in years past.

By 862, Salomon was the centre of the revolt against Charles the Bald, though he had not made war on the king himself since 860. In that year he hired the services of a band of Vikings with which to fight Robert the Strong, who himself had hired mercenary Vikings to help him. Salomon also lent a force of Bretons to aid Louis the Stammerer, now in league with the rebels, in his war with Robert. In 863, Charles gathered an army and began marching on Brittany, but held off near Entrammes and negotiated a peace with Salomon whereby western Anjou was recognised as a part of Brittany and the lay abbacy of Saint-Aubin in Angers was granted to Salomon, who commended himself to Charles and paid tribute.

== Revolt of 865–867 ==
Salomon did not give up his war with Robert or his alliance with the Vikings quite so readily, however. In 865 and 866, the Vikings and Bretons ravaged the vicinity of Le Mans and Robert was killed in the Battle of Brissarthe against the Vikings allied with the Bretons. This was the start of a new insurrection; even Pope Nicholas I wrote letters to Salomon urging him to resume the halted tribute payments. Charles marched on Brittany in 867, but Salomon sent his son-in-law Pascweten to negotiate a peace at Compiègne in August. Charles sent hostages to Salomon and Pascweten swore oaths of fealty to Charles on Salomon's behalf.

== Peace and regalia ==
This peace was to last until the end of Salomon's life. Charles rewarded his now faithful vassal with a gift of regalia in 868, including a golden, jewelled crown. It is also likely that Salomon's two-year-old son Wigo was baptised on this occasion and that Charles acted as godfather to him, thus making Salomon and Charles linked by "blood" as co-fathers. Though Salomon thereafter began to call himself king, he was not king in any official capacity, as an eleventh-century historian at Redon monastery wrote:

Salomon was called king, not because it was true in fact, but because he wore a gold coronet and purple robes by a grant of the Emperor Charles, and for this reason was designated by this name.

Salomon expended some effort in the mid-860s trying to have Pope Nicholas send the pallium to the Bishop of Dol to create an archdiocese for all the Breton bishoprics, which did not recognise the Archdiocese of Tours, their legal metropolitan. Salomon may have wanted an archbishop which was pliable to his wishes or who could consecrate him as king. Perhaps he simply wished to break the deadlock which had ensued following Nominoe's deposition of five Breton bishops a decade and a half earlier.

In 874, a conspiracy involving Pascweten, Wrhwant, and Wigo, son of Riwallon, Count of Cornouaille, plotted to kill Salomon. They succeeded in this, though they quickly fell out with each other and a civil war followed until 876.

== Veneration ==
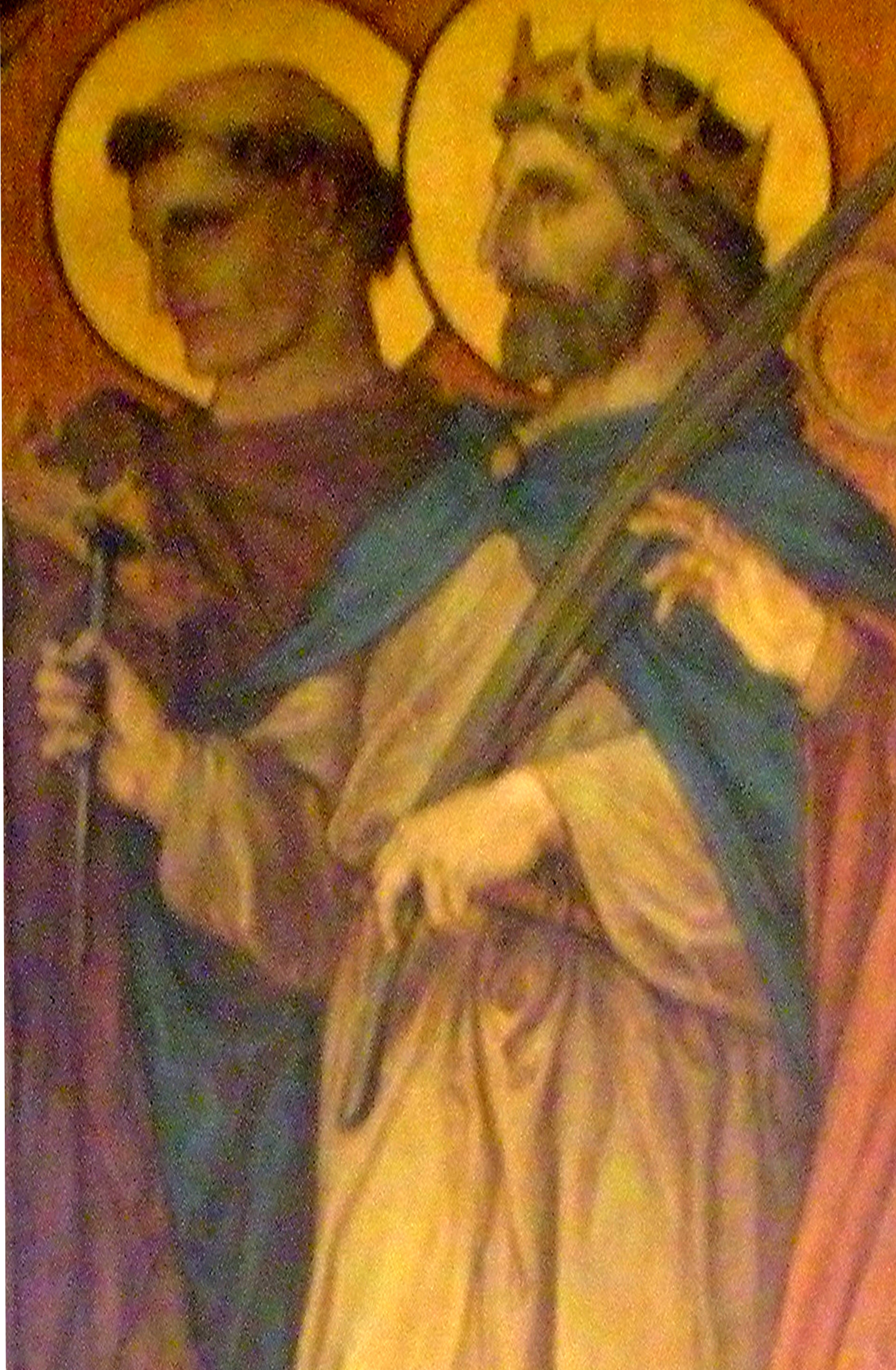
Fresco by Alphonse Le Henaff in the Cathédrale Saint-Pierre de Rennes

Salomon III of Bretagne is honored in the Catholic Church on 25 June.

== See also ==
- Kings and dukes of Brittany family tree

Regnal titles
Preceded by Erispoe	Duke of Brittany; 857–874	Succeeded by Pasquitan and Gurvand
Preceded by Lambert II	Count of Nantes; 852-860	Succeeded by Robert the Strong
