= Saint-Thurien =

Saint-Thurien may refer to two communes in France, both of them named after Saint Turian (Breton Sant Turian) a 7th Century saint:

- Saint-Thurien, Eure, in the Eure département
- Saint-Thurien, Finistère, in the Finistère département
