= Valérie Quennessen =

French theatre and film actress (1957–1989)

- Born: 3 December 1957; Boulogne-Billancourt, Hauts-de-Seine, France
- Died: 19 March 1989 (aged 31); Saint-Ouen-des-Champs, Eure, Haute-Normandie, France
- Resting place: Cimetière du Montparnasse
- Years active: 1976–1989
- Spouse: François Manceaux
- Children: 2

Valérie Quennessen (3 December 1957 – 19 March 1989) was a French theatre and film actress.

== Biography ==
Quennessen was born near Paris in Boulogne-Billancourt, of Jewish French/Polish parentage, and dedicated much of her childhood to pursuing her dream of becoming an acrobat. She quickly reached a level of competence and received an award for her expertise at the age of ten. By her teens, she had given up acrobatics and enrolled in acting classes, not because she particularly wanted to get into show business, but to help her overcome social anxiety. She found that she not only overcame her shyness via acting, but she also enjoyed performing. She studied drama first briefly at the École nationale supérieure des arts et techniques du théâtre, then at the Conservatoire National d'Art Dramatique, in Paris, from 1976 to 1979, and appeared in several theater productions, notably Chers Zoiseaux, by Jean Anouilh, which premiered in 1976, and Pirandello's Nuova colonia (1977).

She made her first film appearances in a pair of 1976 French films: Little Marcel and Le Plein de Super. She continued to appear in the occasional French film and television show, and in 1979 she landed one of the main roles in the American film French Postcards (Willard Huyck), working alongside Miles Chapin, Debra Winger and Mandy Patinkin. She followed up that film by playing Princess Yasimina in John Milius's 1982 film Conan the Barbarian with Arnold Schwarzenegger in the title role.

Randal Kleiser's Summer Lovers was the peak of her career for American audiences. This story of a love triangle on the Greek island of Santorini also starred Peter Gallagher and Daryl Hannah.

Shortly after Summer Lovers, Valérie Quennessen appeared in the short We Cannes, filmed by François Manceaux during the 1982 film festival, then gradually retired from acting, choosing to concentrate on raising her family. She and François Manceaux had two children, Antoine (born 1982) and Elsa (born 1985), both of them born in France. On March 19, 1989, she died in a car accident on the A13 highway in Saint-Ouen-des-Champs at the age of 31.

In July 2017, the Tampa Bay Times, citing IMDb, reported that, during the filming of Summer Lovers, Quennessen, who played Lina, an archaeologist, discovered pottery at the Akrotiri site that was circa 3,500 years old.

== Filmography ==
- Le Petit Marcel (Jacques Fansten, 1976) as a receptionist
- Le Plein de super (Alain Cavalier, 1976) as Marie
- Nuova colonia (Anne Delbée, 1978, TV adaptation) as Mita
- La Tortue sur le dos (Luc Béraud, 1978) as a Nietzsche student
- Brigade des mineurs: Tête de rivière (Guy Lessertisseur, 1978—TV episode) as Doris
- On efface tout (Pascal Vidal, 1978)
- Martin et Léa (Alain Cavalier, 1979) as Cléo
- French Postcards (Willard Huyck, 1979) as Toni
- Pause-café (Serge Leroy, 1981—TV miniseries, one episode) as a secretary
- Silas (Sigi Rothemund, 1981—German TV miniseries, one episode) as Melinda, a washerwoman
- Les Uns et les Autres (Claude Lelouch, 1981) as Francis Huster's character girlfriend
- Conan the Barbarian (John Milius, 1982) as Princess Yasimina
- Summer Lovers (Randal Kleiser, 1982) as Lina
- We Cannes (François Manceaux, 1982 short) as Janine
- Quartier sud (Mathias Ledoux, 1984—TV) as Rebecca
- La petite commission (Jean-Paul Salomé, 1985 short) as Sister Clarisse
- Mode in France (William Klein, 1985—TV) as a model/female cop
- Haute tension: Eaux troubles (Alain Bonnot, 1989—TV episode) as Judith

== Theatre ==
- Bajazet, by Jean Racine (director Stéphan Boublil, Studio d'Ivry, 1976)
- Phèdre, by Jean Racine (Antoine Bourseiller, Théâtre Récamier, 1976), as Ismène
- Chers Zoiseaux, by Jean Anouilh (Jean Anouilh and Roland Piétri, Comédie des Champs-Élysées, 1976), as one of the "Girls"
- Nuova colonia, by Luigi Pirandello (Anne Delbée, Nouveau Carré Silvia Montfort, 1977), as Mita
- Babylone, by Alain Gautré (Pierre Pradinas, Compagnie du Chapeau rouge, Avignon, 1979)
