= Évrart de Trémaugon =

French medieval jurist and cleric

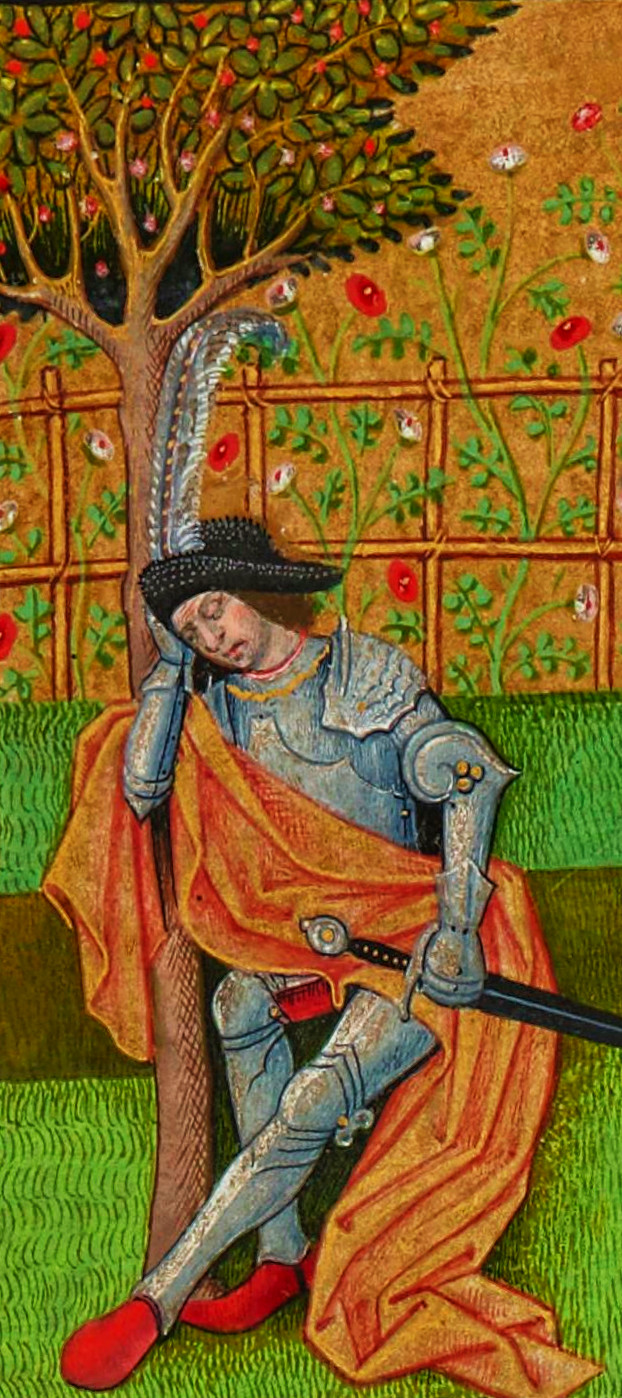
A miniature illustration from a 15th-century manuscript of Évrart de Trémaugon's Le Songe du Vergier (The Orchard Dream)

Évrart de Trémaugon (died 1386) was a French writer and jurist from Brittany. From 1373 he served as a senior royal official and adviser to the king of France and was also Bishop of Dol from 1382 to 1386. Évrart is the likely author of Le Songe du Vergier, also known as Somnium Viridarii, a political treatise commissioned by Charles V of France.

== Origins and family ==
Évrart de Trémaugon's date of birth is unknown but it is believed he was born in Brittany. According to a petition he sent to the Pope in 1379, he was originally from the Breton Diocese of Léon (modern Quimper).

In papal records he is called "Evrardus Nuzi de Tremaugon" and "Evrardus Nuzisi de Tromangon", suggesting that his family name was Nuz or Le Nuz, a surname that existed in Brittany. It was also a Breton given name during the Middle Ages and derived from the name of the Celtic deity Nodens.

His family are believed to have been from the Breton minor nobility. French historian Alfred Coville contended that the family held a seigneury named Trémaugon which was near Saint-Brieuc on the northern coast of Brittany. Colville also thought it was abolished in a 17th-century reform of the nobility.

Évrart had an older brother named Yon or Yvon. Yvon was a knight who served with distinction in a number of campaigns as a close associate of the French commander Bertrand du Guesclin. He died, possibly murdered, in 1384 after being imprisoned by the Count of Alençon for insulting him.

== Education and career ==
Évrart was a cleric. He first appears in the historical record in 1363 when, as a canon at Rouen Cathedral, he was given the parish of St Nicholas at Conteville in Normandy. In the same year he was also appointed to a position at Beauvais Cathedral.

Évrart studied civil law and canon law and became a doctor in utroque jure. In 1367, in Italy, he received his licentiate in canon law from the University of Bologna, where he met the Italian jurist John of Legnano and the scholar Gaspard Calderini. They introduced him to the Bishop of Bologna's officials and to the canons of the cathedral. He himself says that it was thanks to his brother, Yvon, that he completed his studies.

From 1369, he was a professor at the University of Paris. Between 1371 and 1373 he authored The Three Lessons on the Decretals, his only definitively attested texts that have survived. These were more detailed versions of lectures he had given in Paris on the Decretals, that is papal legal rulings. In October 1373, he was appointed to the Conseil du Roi of Charles V and in 1374 he became Master of Requests. In 1374 he was authorized by the Pope to appoint a deputy for his University role so that he could devote himself to his duties to the crown.

In 1376, Évrart was instructed by Charles V to go to Scotland to negotiate an alliance with Robert II, King of Scots. However, as a result of the interference of Louis de Male, Count of Flanders, his mission failed when he was waylaid in the Low Countries and forced to attend Louis in Ghent. In 1381, he was again performing the role of King's advisor and Master of Requests in Paris. On 17 October 1382, he was appointed Bishop of Dol by the antipope, Clement VII following Guy de Roye's transfer from Dol to be the bishop of Verdun.

== Le Songe du Vergier ==
In 1376, a political treatise, titled Somnium Viridarii (The Orchard Dream), was prepared in Latin for Charles V of France and published anonymously. A shortened popularised version in French was published two years later with the title translated as Le Songe du Vergier. The original manuscript is held by the British Library and contains a handwritten note made by Charles V giving the date and title of the work and acknowledging that he commissioned it. The French historian Alfred Coville was, in 1933, the first to propose that Évrart wrote the work. However this did not gain general acceptance until the historian Marion Schnerb-Lièvre published more convincing analyses in the 1980s and 1990s.

The format is a series of conversations between a cleric and knight and through their dialogue the arguments in favour of French monarchical authority against the claims of the Church are upheld. It also strays into discussing a wide range of other topics. The treatise contains the earliest known detailed rebuttal of the English claim to the French throne, a major issue in the Hundred Years' War then being fought. The validity of the House of Valois's succession to the throne is defended on the basis that customary law required the French crown to pass only through the male line. The English claim was through the female line whereas the Valois inherited the crown through the male line.

== Dispute with Guillaume de Chamborant ==
In 1383, Évrart came to believe that one of the king's equerries, Guillaume de Chamborant, had murdered his brother, Yvon. On 16 March 1383, Évrart interrupted the king's dinner at the Louvre Palace to accuse Guillaume of the murder. Imprisoned, Guillaume appeared before the king at the Louvre on 5 April to answer the charge. Évrart did not show up but sent Raoul Drobille, the prosecutor at the Parlement of Paris, to represent him. The case was adjourned awaiting Évrart's attendance. At Guillaume's second appearance before the king on 7 April, Drobille explained Évrart's absence by saying that he had had to go to Brittany on a mission on behalf of the Duke of Burgundy. The latter would later say that that was untrue. At Guillaume's third hearing on 26 April neither Évrart nor anyone to represent him appeared. The dispute was referred to the Parlement of Paris, where it dragged on in similar fashion. Finally, on 30 July 1384, the Parlement dismissed the charge and ordered Évrart to pay Guillaume 500 livres tournois as a fine.

== Death ==
Évrart attended the Estates of Brittany in May 1386 and died later in the year, heavily in debt to his late uncle Guy du Tertre, canon of Beauvais.

== Bibliography ==
- Borderie, Arthur Le Moyne de La (1914). Histoire de Bretagne. Vol. 4. Plihon, Honnay et Vatar.
- Courtenay, William J. (2002). Rotuli Parisienses: 1378-1394. Vol. 3. Brill. ISBN 978-90-04-12563-6.
- Dorin, Rowan (2024). "Dangerous Dreams: Le Songe du Vergier and the Expulsion of Jews from Fourteenth-Century France". In Kamali, E.P.; Lettmaier, S.; Hatzimihail, N. E. (eds.). The Learned and Lived Law: Essays in Honor of Charles Donahue. Brill. ISBN 978-90-04-71069-6.
- Famiglietti, Richard C. (2015). Audouin Chauveron, Prévôt de Paris (1381-1389), Officier Limousin du Roi et du Duc de Berry Sous Charles V et Charles VI: Enquête. Picardy Press. ISBN 978-0-9633494-0-8.
- Haut-Jussé, Barthélémy Pocquet du (2000). Les papes et les ducs de Bretagne: essai sur les rapports du Saint-Siège avec un État. Coop Breizh. ISBN 978-2-84346-077-7.
- Henderson, George (1905). "The Fionn Saga". The Celtic Review. 1 (3): 193–207. doi:10.2307/30069806. JSTOR 30069806.
- Lartigue, Jean-Jacques (2002). Dictionnaire & armorial de l'épiscopat français: 1200-2000. Intermédiaire des chercheurs et curieux. ISBN 978-2-908003-19-2.
- Morice, Hyacinthe (1744). Mémoires Pour Servir De Preuves A L'Histoire Ecclesiastique Et Civile De Bretagne. Vol. 2. Osmont.
- Schnerb-Lièvre, Marion (1998). "Introduction and Appendices". Trois leçons sur les Décrétales. By Évrart de Trémaugon. CNRS Editions. ISBN 978-2-271-05595-8.
- Stratford, Jenny (2006). "The illustration of the Songe du Vergier and some fifteenth-century manuscripts". In Croenen, Godfried; Ainsworth, Peter F. (eds.). Patrons, Authors and Workshops: Books and Book Production in Paris Around 1400. Peeters Publishers. ISBN 978-90-429-1707-1.
- Taylor, Craig (2001). "The Salic Law and the Valois succession to the French crown". French History. 15 (4): 358–377. doi:10.1093/fh/15.4.358.
