= Saint Alan =

Saint Alan or Saint Alain may refer to:

- Alain de la Roche (1428–1475), or Alanus de Rupe, canonized saint, "Alan of the Rock"
- Alain de Solminihac (1593–1659), French Catholic religious reformer and bishop of Cahors
- Alan of Lavaur, to whom Lavaur Cathedral is dedicated
- Alain of Quimper, medieval Breton saint
