= Turiaf =

Turiaf may refer to:

- Ronny Turiaf (born 1983), French former professional basketball player
- Turiaf of Dol (died c. 750), Breton abbot and priest
