= Saint-Thurien, Eure =

Saint-Thurien
- Part of Le Perrey
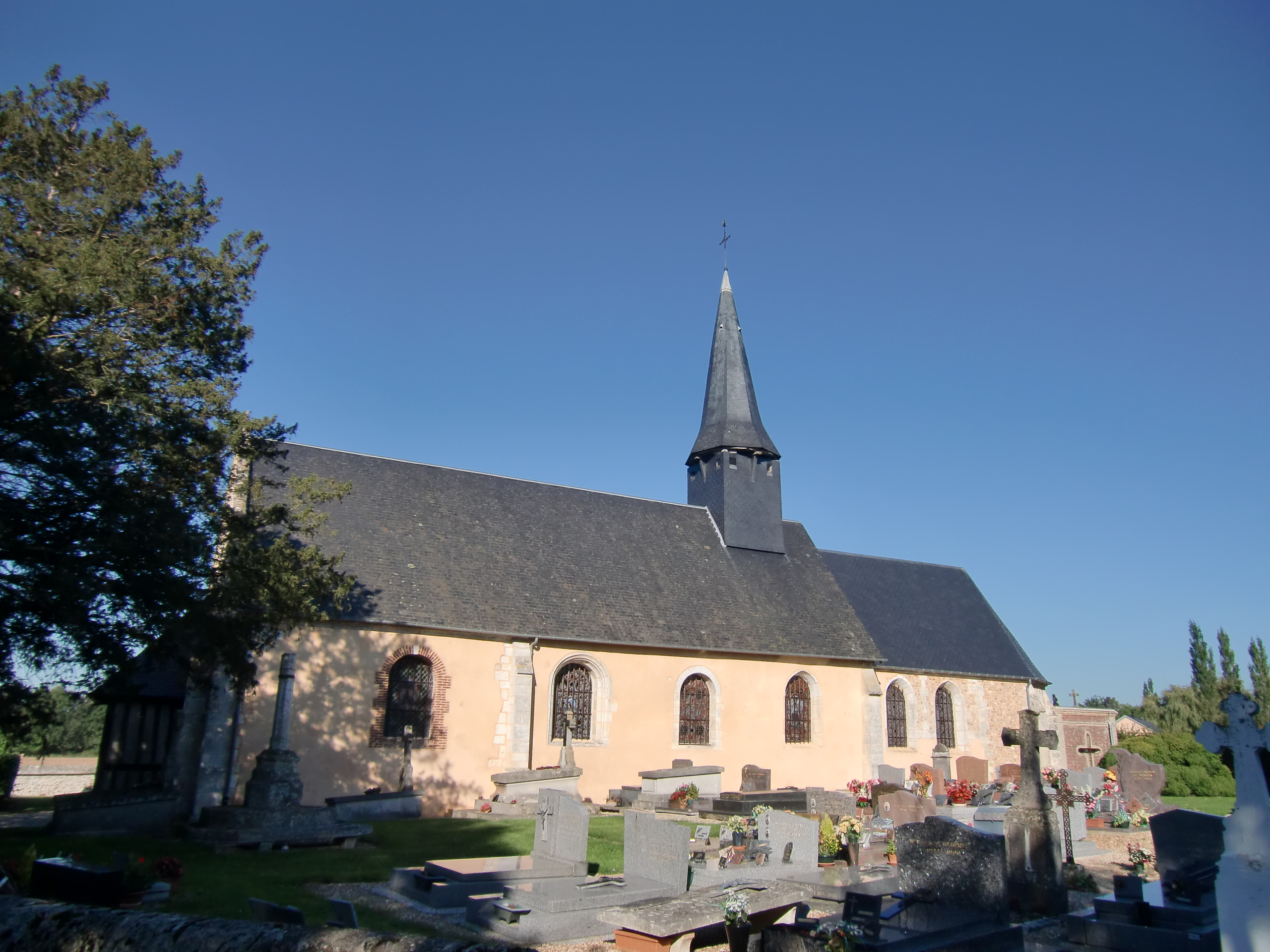
- Location of Saint-Thurien
- Location within France Location within Normandy
- Coordinates: 49°24′28″N 0°33′25″E
- Country: France
- Region: Normandy
- Department: Eure
- Arrondissement: Bernay
- Canton: Bourg-Achard
- Commune: Le Perrey
- Area^{1}: 5.27 km^{2} (2.03 sq mi)
- Elevation: 130 m (430 ft)
- Highest elevation: 131 m (430 ft)
- Lowest elevation: 2 m (6.6 ft)
- Population (2023): 240
  - Density: 46/km^{2} (120/sq mi)
- Time zone: UTC+01:00 (CET)
  - Summer (DST): UTC+02:00 (CEST)
- Postal code: 27680
- ^{1} French Land Register data, which excludes lakes, ponds, glaciers > 1 km^{2} (0.386 sq mi or 247 acres) and river estuaries.

Saint-Thurien (French pronunciation: [sɛ̃ tyʁjɛ̃]) is a former commune in the Eure department in Normandy in northern France. On 1 January 2019, it was merged into the new commune Le Perrey.

It took its name from Saint Turiaf of Dol, bishop of the ancient Diocese of Dol.

== See also ==
- Communes of the Eure department
