= Diocese of Quimper =

Catholic diocese in France

Coordinates: 48.00°N 4.10°W

Diocese of Quimper and Léon Dioecesis Corisopitensis et Leonensis Diocèse de Quimper et Léon Eskopti Kemper ha Leon

Catholic
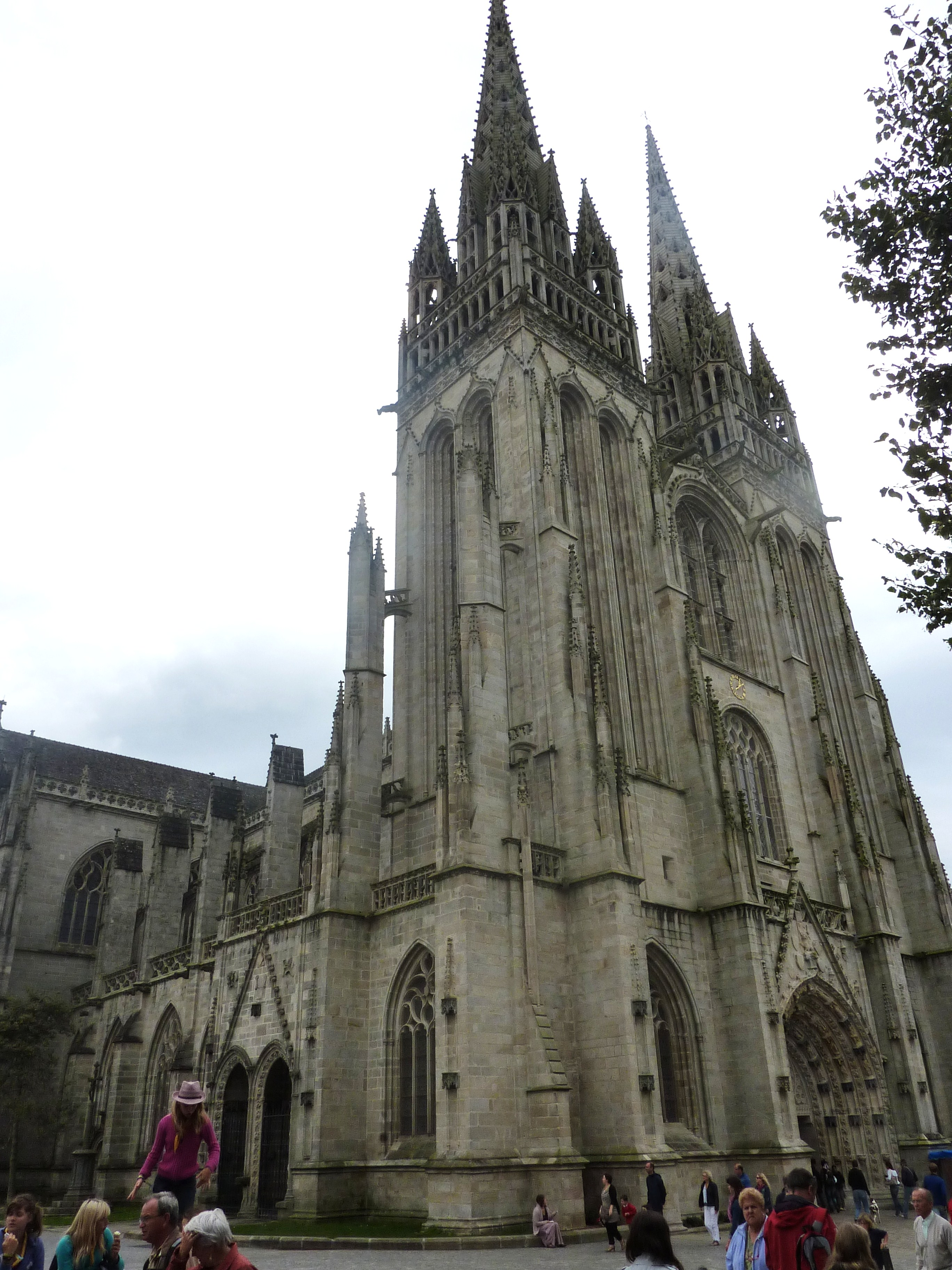
- Quimper Cathedral

Location
- Country: France
- Ecclesiastical province: Rennes
- Metropolitan: Archdiocese of Rennes, Dol, and Saint-Malo

Statistics
- Area: 6,785 km^{2} (2,620 sq mi)
- Population: Total; Catholics: (as of 2022); 915,090 ▲; 915,090 ▼
- Parishes: 324

Information
- Denomination: Catholic
- Sui iuris church: Latin Church
- Rite: Roman Rite
- Established: 5th Century as Diocese of Quimper; 23 November 1853 (As Diocese of Quimper-Léon)
- Cathedral: Cathedral Basilica of St. Corentin in Quimper
- Patron saint: St. Corentin of Quimper
- Secular priests: 161 (diocesan) ▼30 (religious) ▲45 Permanent Deacons ▲

Current leadership
- Pope: Leo XIV
- Bishop: Laurent Dognin
- Metropolitan Archbishop: Pierre d'Ornellas

Map

Website
- catholique-quimper.cef.fr

The Diocese of Quimper (–Cornouaille) and Léon (Latin: Dioecesis Corisopitensis (–Cornubiensis) et Leonensis; French: Diocèse de Quimper (–Cornouaille) et Léon) is a Latin Church ecclesiastical territory or diocese of the Catholic Church in France. In 1853, the name was changed from the Diocese of Quimper (–Cornouaille) to the Diocese of Quimper (–Cornouaille) and Léon.

Originally established in the 5th century, the diocese was dismantled during the anti-clericalism of the French Revolution. It was restored by the Concordat of 1801, as the combination of the Dioceses of Quimper, Saint-Pol-de-Léon and Tréguier in Brittany, France. Traditionally, it formed part of Lower Brittany; today's diocese is coextensive with the Department of Finistère.

The diocese is a suffragan diocese in the ecclesiastical province of the metropolitan Archdiocese of Rennes, Dol, and Saint-Malo. The current bishop is Laurent Marie Bernard Dognin.

== History ==
=== Diocese of Quimper: early history ===
Two versions of the catalogue of the Bishops of Quimper are known: one is from the twelfth century and is held by the Cartulary of Quimperlé; the other is preserved in a Quimper Cartulary of the fifteenth century. Both mention a St. Chorentius as first Bishop of Quimper. His hagiography, however, was developed relatively late in church history. Nothing accurate is known about him, but he is supposed by some to have been ordained by St. Martin of Tours in the fourth century, while others claim that he was a sixth-century monk. Duchesne points out that, before the eleventh century, control of the list of Bishops of Quimper is "très difficile". External material to provide verification is lacking. The tale of Saint-Guénolé (Winwaloe) (ca. 460–532), the alleged first Abbot of Landevennec, is, as Robert Latouche has shown, devoid of historical merit, and the documents on which it depends complete forgeries.

The city of Quimper was the capital of the County of Cornouaille. The Diocese of Quimper was represented at church councils as early as the mid-fifth century. The earliest historical reference dates from 453. An assembly of eight bishops of Provincia Lugdunensis Tertia took place at Angers on 4 October 453 to consecrate a new bishop for Angers. Four of the bishops can be associated with particular Sees. The other four are assigned by scholars to the other dioceses in the ecclesiastical province, one of which was Quimper. One of the four prelates, Sarmatio, Chariato, Rumoridus, and Viventius, was Bishop of Quimper.

==== Diocese of Saint-Pol-de-Léon ====
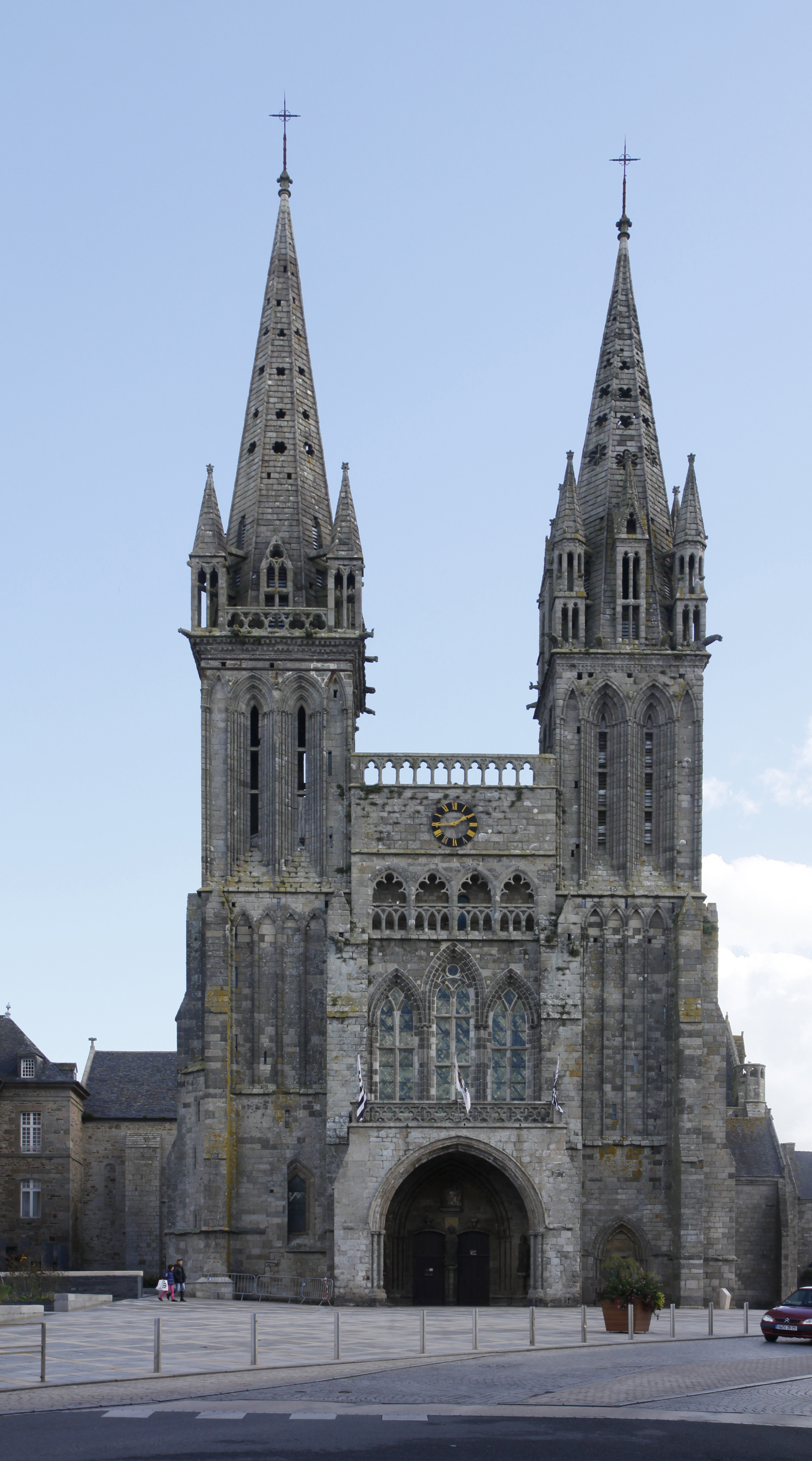
Cathedral St.-Paul-Aurelian, Saint-Pol

There is evidence that Christianity was preached in Léon twenty years before the evangelization of Cornouaille, but ancient Breton chronology is very uncertain. The legend of St. Paul Aurelian, written in 884, shows that the Breton monks believed the See of Léon had been founded in the Merovingian epoch. The hermit Saint Ronan, a native of Ireland, often held to be one of the 350 bishops consecrated by Saint Patrick, was in the fifth century known as one of the apostles of Cornouailles and the neighbourhood around Léon. Paul Aurelian, a Gallic monk, founder of monasteries at Ouessant on the north-west coast of Brittany and on the Island of Batz, was believed to have founded in an abandoned fort a monastery which gave origin to the town of St. Pol de Léon, afterwards the seat of a diocese. He was the first titular of the see, a wonder-worker and prophet, and was held to have died in 575 at the age of 140 years, after having been assisted in his labours by three successive coadjutors. Though the monastery of Léon was probably founded by Paul Aurelian in the sixth century, the history of the diocese is more complicated. It is at least certain that there are traces in history of a Diocese of Léon as far back as the middle of the ninth century.

==== Cathedral of Saint-Corentin, Quimper ====
The cornerstone of Quimper Cathedral was laid in 1424, but the building was still unfinished at the beginning of the sixteenth century. When Alexander VI granted that church the same indulgences as could be gained at the Roman Jubilee, funds came in which allowed its completion. The chapter of the cathedral was composed of six dignities and twelve Canons. The dignities were: the Dean, the Archdeacon of Cornuaille, the Archdeacon of Poher, the Treasurer, the Cantor and the Theologian. The Abbot of Doulas was always first Canon ex officio, and held precedence in the Chapter after the Bishop.

There were two Collegiate Churches in the diocese, Saint-Trémeur de Carhaix and Notre-Dame de Rostrenen, each headed by a Cantor.

The abbots of seven abbeys in the diocese were subject to nomination by the King and confirmation by the Pope: the Abbey of St. Maurice (O.S.B.), the Abbey of Notre-Dame-de Daoulac (O.S.B.), the Abbey of Landeunnes (O.S.B.), the Abbey of Saint-Crois de Quimperlé (O.S.B.), the Abbey of Bonrepos (Premonstratensian), the Abbey of Notre Dame de Coeurmalaoüen (O.S.B.), and the Abbey of Langonnet (O.S.B.).

==== Other churches ====
The Cathedral of St. Pol de Léon, which is now in the Diocese of Quimper, was built between the 13th and 16th centuries. The Church of Notre Dame de Creisker, in the same town, restored in the fourteenth century, has a belfry which the Bretons claim to be the handsomest in the world. Formerly Quimperlé had an important Benedictine abbey, Sainte Croix, founded in 1029 and where the Benedictines of St. Maur took up their residence in 1665. Along with all abbeys, convents, and monasteries, it was suppressed by the National Constituent Assembly and by the Civil Constitution of the Clergy. Monastic vows were abolished. Brest, one of the great fortified harbours of France, is now in the diocese.

=== Diocese of Quimper: 17th and 18th centuries ===
In 1608 Counter-Reformation preacher Michel Le Nobletz conducted his first mission on the island of Ouessant. "Apostle of Brittany" Father Julian Maunoir worked as a missionary to the Breton people for 43 years. Albert Le Grand wrote the "Lives of the Saints of Brittany" (1636) and published a Breton dictionary, and some devotional works in Breton. Today he is considered by some to be the founder of Breton philology. There was already a grammar school in Quimper in 1348, but never a university. The Jesuits were established in the Collège de Quimper in 1620 where they flourished until the Society of Jesus was expelled from France in 1763.

Other notable persons whose origins were in the Diocese of Quimper are: the classical scholar Jean Hardouin (1646–1729), the critic Élie Catherine Fréron (1719–71), and the physician René Laennec (1781–1826), inventor of the stethoscope.

In 1772, the city of Quimper contained about 10,000 persons, and in the city there were five parishes. The entire diocese contained some 180 parishes.

=== The Revolution ===
During the French revolution the Diocese of Quimper was abolished and subsumed into a new diocese, coterminous with the new 'Departement de Finistère', which was made a suffragan of the 'Metropole du Nord-Ouest' with its seat at Rennes. The clergy were required to swear and oath to the Constitution, and under the terms of the Civil Constitution of the Clergy a new bishop was to be elected by all the voters of the department. This placed them in schism with the Roman Catholic Church and the Pope. The Chapter of Quimper entered a protest on 26 October 1790 against the uncanonical election of a bishop by 'electors'. The Constituent Assembly chose, as successor of the deceased Bishop Conan de Saint-Luc, Louis Alexandre Expilly, the Rector of the church of St. Martin at Morlaix. He had been the delegate of Saint-Pol-de-Leon to the Estates General of 1789 and was one of the authors of the Civil Constitution of the Clergy. Expilly was presented to King Louis XVI who ratified his election. He therefore became the first of the Constitutional Bishops. The Chapter of Quimper on 17 November wrote to the Constitutional Bishop-elect proclaiming the nullity of his election.

Expilly was consecrated in Paris at the Oratory by Charles-Maurice de Talleyrand, Bishop of Autun, on 24 February 1791. Expilly then assisted Jean-Baptiste Gobel, a legitimate bishop consecrated in 1772, who had apostasized and was then Constitutional Bishop of Paris, in the consecration of additional Constitutional bishops on 27 February and 6 March. He then proceeded to Quimper for his installation. He faced great difficulties both from the flight of many of his clergy in the face of the Terror, and from the seizure of large areas of the countryside by the Chouans, who were loyal to the monarchy. He had himself elected president of the departmental Directory, but his increasingly moderate stance brought him under suspicion from the Jacobins. He was denounced and arrested, and guillotined at Brest on 22 May 1794. His successor, Yves Audrin, was executed by the Chouans on 19/20 November 1800.

In accordance with the Concordat of 1801, Pope Pius VII restored the Diocese of Quimper in 1802. The lessons taught by the reduction in the number of bishoprics by the Civil Constitution of the Clergy of 1790, and the rationalization of diocesan boundaries to coincide with civil administration districts called 'départmentes', did not go unnoticed. Only four of the nine Breton dioceses were restored. Quimper received all of the former diocese of St.-Pol-de-Léon, most of the former Diocese of Cornuaille, a canton and two parishes of the Diocese of Vannes, and parts of the former Diocese of Dol; Quimper, however, handed over some of its eastern parishes to Vannes and to Saint-Brieuc. Quimper returned to its status as a suffragan of Tours. When Rennes became an archbishopric in 1859, however, Quimper was assigned to that Metropolitanate, as it had been during the days of the Revolution.

== Bishops of Quimper ==
=== to 1300 ===
- ? (attested 453)
- Corentinus
- Alain of Quimper

...

- Felix (attested 835, 848)
- Anaweten (attested in 850s)
- Benedictus (ca. 906 or 940)
- Orscandus (ca. 1029 – ca. 1065)
- Robertus (after 1113 – 1130)
- Radulfus (by 1140 – 4 March 1158)
- Bernard de Moëlan (1159–1167)
- Godfredus (Geoffroy) (by 1170 – 1185)
- Theobaldus (1187 – 18 May 1192)
- Guillaume (June 1192 – 15 December 1218)
- Ranulfus (July 1219 – 5 May 1245)
- Hervaeus de Landeleu (1245 – 9 August 1260)
- Guido (Vitus) Plounevez (1261 – 12 July 1267)
- Ivo Cabellic (1267–1280)
- Evenus de la Forêt (14 May 1283 – 14 March 1290)

=== 1300 to 1600 ===
- Alain Morel
- Thomas Denast
- Bernardus, O.Min.
- Guy Laval
- Jacques Corvus, O.P.
- Ivo de Boisboessel (31 August 1330 – 22 January 1333)
- Alain Gontier
- Alain Angall
- Gaufridus de Quoetmozan
- Gaufridus Lemarhec (20 March 1357 – 1383)
- Theobaldus de Malestroit (3 December 1383 – May 1408) (Avignon Obedience)

...

- Alain le Mault (8 March 1484 – 2 November 1493)
- Raoul le Chauve de Moël (13 November 1493 – 31 May 1501)
- Claude de Rohan (25 June 1501 – July 1540)
- Guillaume Éder (Jul 1540 – 22 May 1546)
- Cardinal Philippe de La Chambre, O.S.B. (19 Jul 1546 – 21 February 1550)
- Cardinal Niccolò Caetani di Sermoneta (14 Jul 1550 – 5 April 1560) (Administrator)
- Étienne Bouchier (5 April 1560 – 20 August 1573)
- François de la Tour (26 August 1573 – 14 October 1583)
- Charles de Liescoët (15 November 1582 – 14 March 1614)

=== 1600 to 1800 ===
- Guillaume le Prètre (17 November 1614 – 8 November 1640)
- René du Louet (1 December 1642 – 11 February 1668)
- [François Visdelieu (Coadjutor, did not succeed)] (27 February 1651 – 27 July 1665)
- François de Coëtlogon (1 March 1666 – 6 November 1706)
- François Hyacinthe de Ploeuc (11 April 1707 – 6 January 1739)
- Auguste François Hannibal de Farcy de Cuillé (30 September 1739 – 28 June 1771)
- Emmanuel Louis de Grossolles de Flamarens (14 December 1772 – 14 June 1773)
- Toussaint François Joseph Conen de Saint-Luc (12 July 1773 – 30 September 1790)
  - Louis Alexandre Expilly (October 1790 – May 1794) (Constitutional Bishop of Finistère)
  - Yves Audrein (Spring 1798 – 19/20 November 1800) (Constitutional Bishop of Finistère)

=== since 1802 ===
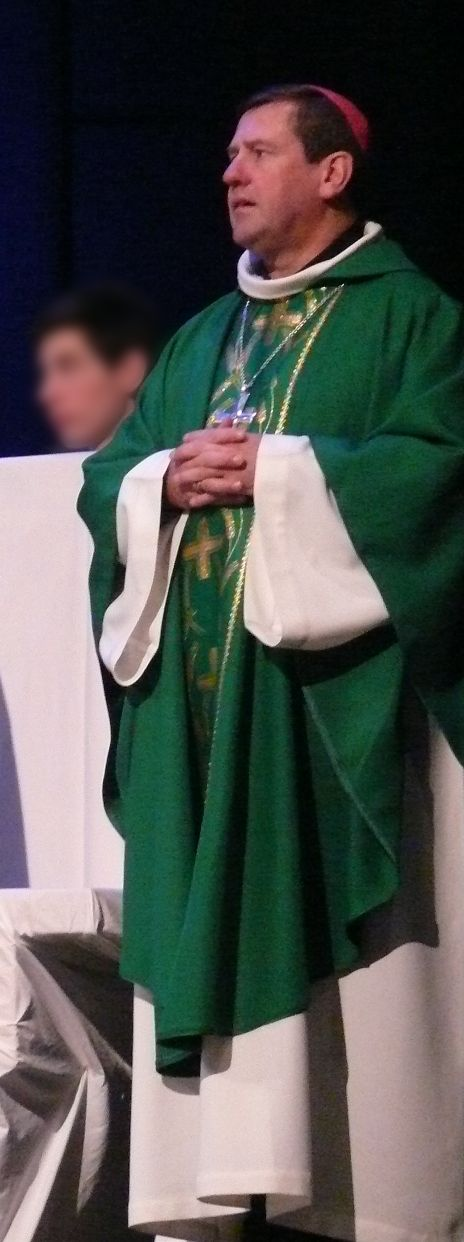
Bishop Le Vert

- Claude André (April 9, 1802 – 1804)
- Pierre-Vincent Dombideau de Crouseilhes (January 30, 1805 – June 29, 1823)
- Jean-Marie-Dominique de Poulpiquet de Brescanvel (September 12, 1823 – May 1, 1840)
- Jean-Marie Graveran (May 26, 1840 – February 1, 1855)
- Nicolas-Marie Sergent (February 6, 1855 – July 26, 1871)
- Charles-Marie-Denis-Anselme Nouvel de La Flèche (October 16, 1871 – June 1, 1887)
- Jacques-Théodore Lamarche (November 8, 1887 – June 15, 1892)
- Henri-Victor Valleau (November 26, 1892 – December 24, 1898)
- François-Virgile Dubillard (December 7, 1899 – December 16, 1907)
- Adolphe-Yves-Marie Duparc (February 11, 1908 – May 8, 1946)
- André-Pierre-François Fauvel (April 24, 1947 – February 28, 1968)
- Francis Jules Joseph Marie Barbu (February 28, 1968 – May 3, 1989)
- Clément Joseph Marie Raymond Guillon, (May 3, 1989 – July 9, 2010)
- Jean Marie Le Vert, (Dec 7, 2007 – January 22, 2015)
- Laurent Marie Bernard Dognin (20 May 2015 – )

== Bibliography ==
=== Reference works ===
==== Pouillés ====
Survey of benefices, patrons, and taxation rates:

- Besse, J.-M., ed. (1920). Abbayes et prieurés de l'ancienne France. Province ecclésiastique de Tours (in French). Vol. Tome huitième. Paris: A. Picard. pp. 201–225.
- Longnon, Auguste, ed. (1903). Recueil des historiens de la France: Pouillés (in Latin). Vol. Tome III : Province de Tours. Paris: Imprimerie nationale. pp. 299–311.
- Pouillé général contenant les bénéfices de l'archevêché de Tours (in French). Paris: Gervais Alliot. 1648. (each diocese separately paginated, but ca. pp. 428–439)

==== Episcopal Lists ====
- Gams, Pius Bonifatius (1873). Series episcoporum Ecclesiae catholicae: quotquot innotuerunt a beato Petro apostolo. Ratisbon: Typis et Sumptibus Georgii Josephi Manz. (Use with caution; obsolete)
- Eubel, Conradus, ed. (1913). Hierarchia catholica, Tomus 1 (second ed.). Münster: Libreria Regensbergiana. (in Latin)
- Eubel, Conradus, ed. (1914). Hierarchia catholica, Tomus 2 (second ed.). Münster: Libreria Regensbergiana. (in Latin)
- Eubel, Conradus; Gulik, Guilelmus (1923). Hierarchia catholica, Tomus 3 (second ed.). Münster: Libreria Regensbergiana.
- Gauchat, Patritius (Patrice) (1935). Hierarchia catholica IV (1592–1667). Münster: Libraria Regensbergiana.
- Ritzler, Remigius; Sefrin, Pirminus (1952). Hierarchia catholica medii et recentis aevi V (1667–1730). Patavii: Messagero di S. Antonio.
- Ritzler, Remigius; Sefrin, Pirminus (1958). Hierarchia catholica medii et recentis aevi VI (1730–1799). Patavii: Messagero di S. Antonio.
- Ritzler, Remigius; Sefrin, Pirminus (1968). Hierarchia Catholica medii et recentioris aevi sive summorum pontificum, S. R. E. cardinalium, ecclesiarum antistitum series... A pontificatu Pii PP. VII (1800) usque ad pontificatum Gregorii PP. XVI (1846) (in Latin). Vol. VII. Monasterii: Libr. Regensburgiana.
- Ritzler, Remigius; Pirminus Sefrin (1978). Hierarchia catholica Medii et recentioris aevi... A Pontificatu PII PP. IX (1846) usque ad Pontificatum Leonis PP. XIII (1903) (in Latin). Vol. VIII. Il Messaggero di S. Antonio.
- Pięta, Zenon (2002). Hierarchia catholica medii et recentioris aevi... A pontificatu Pii PP. X (1903) usque ad pontificatum Benedictii PP. XV (1922) (in Latin). Vol. IX. Padua: Messagero di San Antonio. ISBN 978-88-250-1000-8.

=== Studies ===
- Duchesne, Louis (1910). Fastes épiscopaux de l'ancienne Gaule: II. L'Aquitaine et les Lyonnaises. Paris: Fontemoing.
- Du Tems, Hugues (1774). Le clergé de France, ou tableau historique et chronologique des archevêques, évêques, abbés, abbesses et chefs des chapitres principaux du royaume, depuis la fondation des églises jusqu'à nos jours (in French). Vol. Tome premier. Paris: Delalain.
- Haureau, B., ed. (1856). Gallia christiana: in provincias ecclesiasticas distributa... opera et studio Domni Dionysii Sammarthani. Ubi de provincia Turonensi agitur (in Latin). Vol. Tomus quartus decimus (14). Paris: Firmin Didot. pp. 871–914, Instrumenta 189–206.
- Jean, Armand (1891). Les évêques et les archevêques de France depuis 1682 jusqu'à 1801 (in French). Paris: A. Picard.
- Latouche, Robert (1911). Mélanges d'histoire de Cornouaille (VI-XI siècle). Paris: Honoré Champion. (Bibliothèque de l'école pratique des hautes études, Vol. 192).
- Le Moigne, Frédéric; Christian Sorrel (2016). Les évêques français de la Séparation au pontificat de Jean-Paul II (in French). Paris: Editions du Cerf. ISBN 978-2-204-12086-9.
- Morice, Pierre-Hyacinthe; Tresvaux, François-Marie (1839). L'église de Bretagne depuis ses commencements jusqu'à nos jours... (in French). Paris: Méquignon junior. pp. 108–146.
- Société bibliographique (France) (1907). L'épiscopat français depuis le Concordat jusqu'à la Séparation (1802–1905). Paris: Librairie des Saints-Pères.
- Taillandier, Charles R. (1756). Histoire Ecclesiastique et Civile de Bretagne (in French). Vol. Tome II. Paris: Delaguette.
- Téphany, Joseph Marie (1879). Histoire de la persécution religieuse dans les diocèses de Quimper et de Léon de 1790 à 1801 (in French). Quimper: Typ. de Kerangal.
