= French Postcards =

1979 film by Willard Huyck

- Theatrical release poster
- Directed by: Willard Huyck
- Written by: Willard Huyck; Gloria Katz
- Produced by: Gloria Katz
- Starring: Miles Chapin; Blanche Baker; David Marshall Grant; Valérie Quennessen; Debra Winger; Marie-France Pisier; Jean Rochefort
- Cinematography: Bruno Nuytten
- Edited by: Carol Littleton
- Music by: Lee Holdridge
- Production company: NF Geria II Filmgesellschaft m.b.H.
- Distributed by: Paramount Pictures
- Release dates: October 19, 1979 (United States); August 20, 1980 (France)
- Running time: 95 minutes
- Countries: United States; France; West Germany
- Languages: English; French

French Postcards is a 1979 coming-of-age romantic comedy-drama film directed by Willard Huyck, who co-wrote the screenplay with Gloria Katz. It stars Miles Chapin, Blanche Baker, Mitch Hoefer, David Marshall Grant, Valérie Quennessen, Debra Winger, Marie-France Pisier and Jean Rochefort. The film was shot on location in central Paris, and had a contemporary time setting, with American students being used as extras.

== Plot ==
A group of American exchange students spend a year studying in Paris at the fictional Institute of French Studies, run by Madame Catherine Tessier and her husband Monsieur Tessier. Student Laura spends much of her time alone, visiting museums and art galleries and regularly sending postcards to her boyfriend back home who declined the opportunity to join her. Alex's interests are not so much in studying but more in love and life in Paris, and he becomes involved in a tryst with his teacher and the Institute's co-director Madame Tessier. Joel struggles with indecisiveness, which complicates matters when he falls in love with Toni, a local bookstore employee.

== Cast ==
- Miles Chapin as Joel
- Blanche Baker as Laura
- David Marshall Grant as Alex
- Valérie Quennessen as Toni
- Debra Winger as Melanie
- Mandy Patinkin as Darius Sayyid
- Marie-France Pisier as Madame Catherine Tessier
- Jean Rochefort as Monsieur Tessier
- Lynn Carlin as Mrs. Weber
- George Coe as Mr. Weber
- Christophe Bourseiller as Pascal
- François Lalande as Monsieur Levert
- Anémone as Christine
- Veronique Jannot as Malsy
- Marie-Anne Chazel as Cecile
- Laurence Ligneres as Madame Levert
- André Penvern as Jean-Louis
