= Plessé =

- Commune
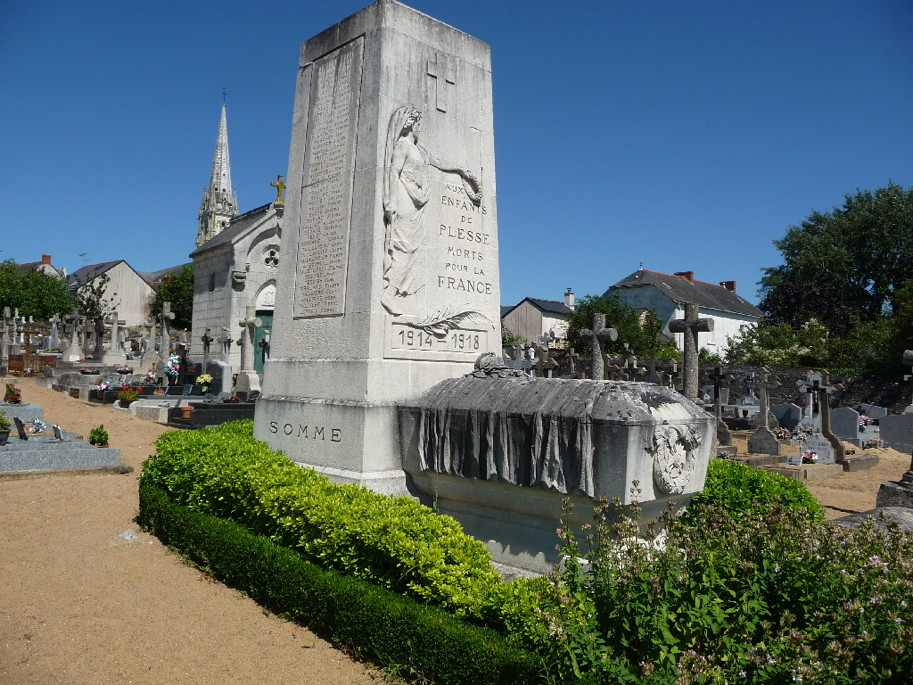
- War memorial
- Location of Plessé
- Location within France Location within Pays de la Loire
- Coordinates: 47°32′33″N 1°53′09″W
- Country: France
- Region: Pays de la Loire
- Department: Loire-Atlantique
- Arrondissement: Châteaubriant-Ancenis
- Canton: Pontchâteau
- Intercommunality: Redon Agglomération

Government
  - Mayor (2020–2026): Aurélie Mezière
- Area^{1}: 104.38 km^{2} (40.30 sq mi)
- Highest elevation: 66 m (217 ft)
- Lowest elevation: 1 m (3.3 ft)
- Population (2023): 5,335
  - Density: 51.11/km^{2} (132.4/sq mi)
- Time zone: UTC+01:00 (CET)
  - Summer (DST): UTC+02:00 (CEST)
- INSEE/Postal code: 44128 /44630
- ^{1} French Land Register data, which excludes lakes, ponds, glaciers > 1 km^{2} (0.386 sq mi or 247 acres) and river estuaries.

Plessé (French pronunciation: [plɛse]; Breton: Plesei) is a commune in the Loire-Atlantique department in western France.

== Population ==
Historical population

Year	Pop.	±% p.a.
1793	2,642	—
1800	2,635	−0.04%
1806	2,954	+1.92%
1821	3,048	+0.21%
1831	3,652	+1.82%
1841	3,406	−0.69%
1846	4,011	+3.32%
1851	4,435	+2.03%
1856	4,539	+0.46%
1861	4,856	+1.36%
1866	5,126	+1.09%
1872	5,405	+0.89%
1876	5,154	−1.18%
1881	5,161	+0.03%
1886	5,366	+0.78%
1891	5,529	+0.60%
1896	5,452	−0.28%
1901	5,436	−0.06%

Year	Pop.	±% p.a.
1906	5,478	+0.15%
1911	5,429	−0.18%
1921	5,232	−0.37%
1926	5,053	−0.69%
1931	4,565	−2.01%
1936	4,264	−1.35%
1946	4,062	−0.48%
1954	3,881	−0.57%
1962	3,683	−0.65%
1968	3,523	−0.74%
1975	3,395	−0.53%
1982	3,436	+0.17%
1990	3,298	−0.51%
1999	3,416	+0.39%
2007	4,130	+2.40%
2012	4,895	+3.46%
2017	5,248	+1.40%
2023	5,335	+0.27%

Source: EHESS and INSEE (1968-2023)

== Notable people ==
- Lucien Petit-Breton (18 October 1882 – 20 December 1917), French racing cyclist, the first to win the Tour de France twice, born in Plessé.
- Clément Guillon (27 April 1932 – 9 July 2010) was the Roman Catholic bishop of Quimper, born in Plessé.
- Catherine de Parthenay (22 March 1554 – 26 October 1631), a French noblewoman and mathematician, born in Plessé.

== See also ==
- Communes of the Loire-Atlantique department
