= Hudson River Blues =

- Directed by: Neil Cox
- Screenplay by: Jennifer Manocherian; John Manocherian
- Produced by: Jennifer Manocherian; John Manocherian
- Starring: Tovah Feldshuh; Mason Adams; Marylouise Burke; Miles Chapin; Polly Draper; Greg Edelman; Ann Harada; Edward Hibbert; Marceline Hugot; Rya Kihlstedt
- Production company: Gun for Hire Films
- Release date: September 16, 1997
- Country: United States
- Language: English

Hudson River Blues is a 1997 American independent film. The movie stars Tovah Feldshuh.

== Plot ==
A two-career couple deals with the wife's urge to become a high-powered lawyer and the husband's desire to change jobs and become an environmentalist caring for the Hudson River."

== Cast ==
- Tovah Feldshuh as Charlotte
- Mason Adams as Grandpa
- Patti Allison as Mrs. Sweet
- Marylouise Burke as Drena
- Miles Chapin as Ben
- Polly Draper as Leslie
- Le Clanche du Rand as Polly
- Gregg Edelman as Dudley
- Andre Gregory as Will
- Scott Hakim as Bartender
- Ann Harada as Robin
- Edward Hibbert as Yago
- William Hill as Jerry
- Marceline Hugot as Helen
- Rya Kihlstedt as Laura
