= Le Perrey =

- Commune
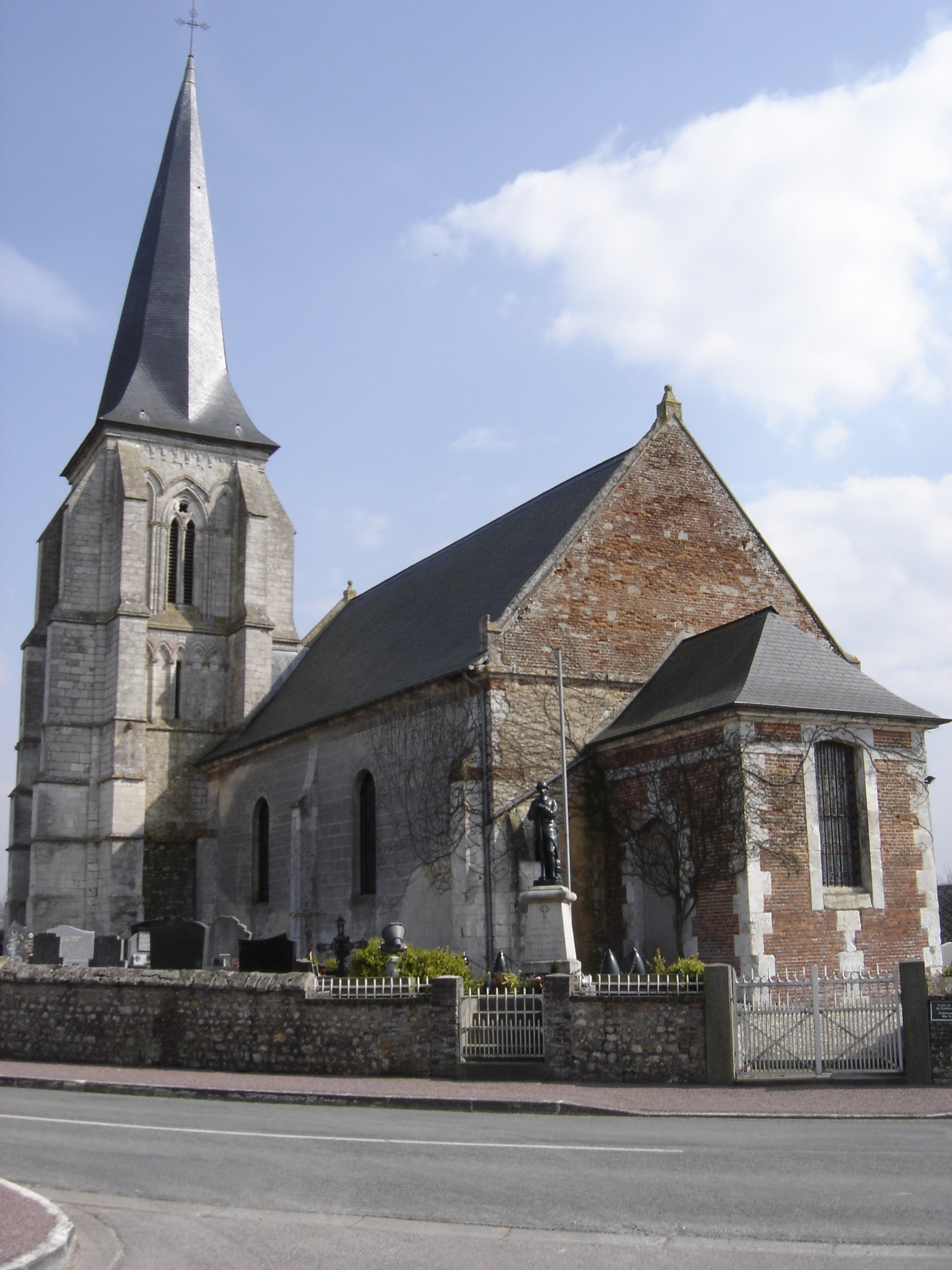
- The church in Fourmetot
- Location of Le Perrey
- Location within France Location within Normandy
- Coordinates: 49°22′56″N 0°34′22″E
- Country: France
- Region: Normandy
- Department: Eure
- Arrondissement: Bernay
- Canton: Pont-Audemer
- Intercommunality: Pont-Audemer / Val de Risle

Government
  - Mayor (2020–2026): Philippe Marie
- Area^{1}: 21.40 km^{2} (8.26 sq mi)
- Highest elevation: 134 m (440 ft)
- Lowest elevation: 2 m (6.6 ft)
- Population (2023): 1,224
  - Density: 57.20/km^{2} (148.1/sq mi)
- Time zone: UTC+01:00 (CET)
  - Summer (DST): UTC+02:00 (CEST)
- INSEE/Postal code: 27263 /27500
- ^{1} French Land Register data, which excludes lakes, ponds, glaciers > 1 km^{2} (0.386 sq mi or 247 acres) and river estuaries.

Le Perrey (French pronunciation: [lə pɛʁɛ]) is a commune in the Eure department in the Normandy region in northern France. It was established on 1 January 2019 by merger of the former communes of Fourmetot (the seat), Saint-Ouen-des-Champs and Saint-Thurien.

== See also ==
- Communes of the Eure department
