= Clément Guillon =

French Roman Catholic bishop

His Excellency Clément Guillon
- Bishop of Quimper
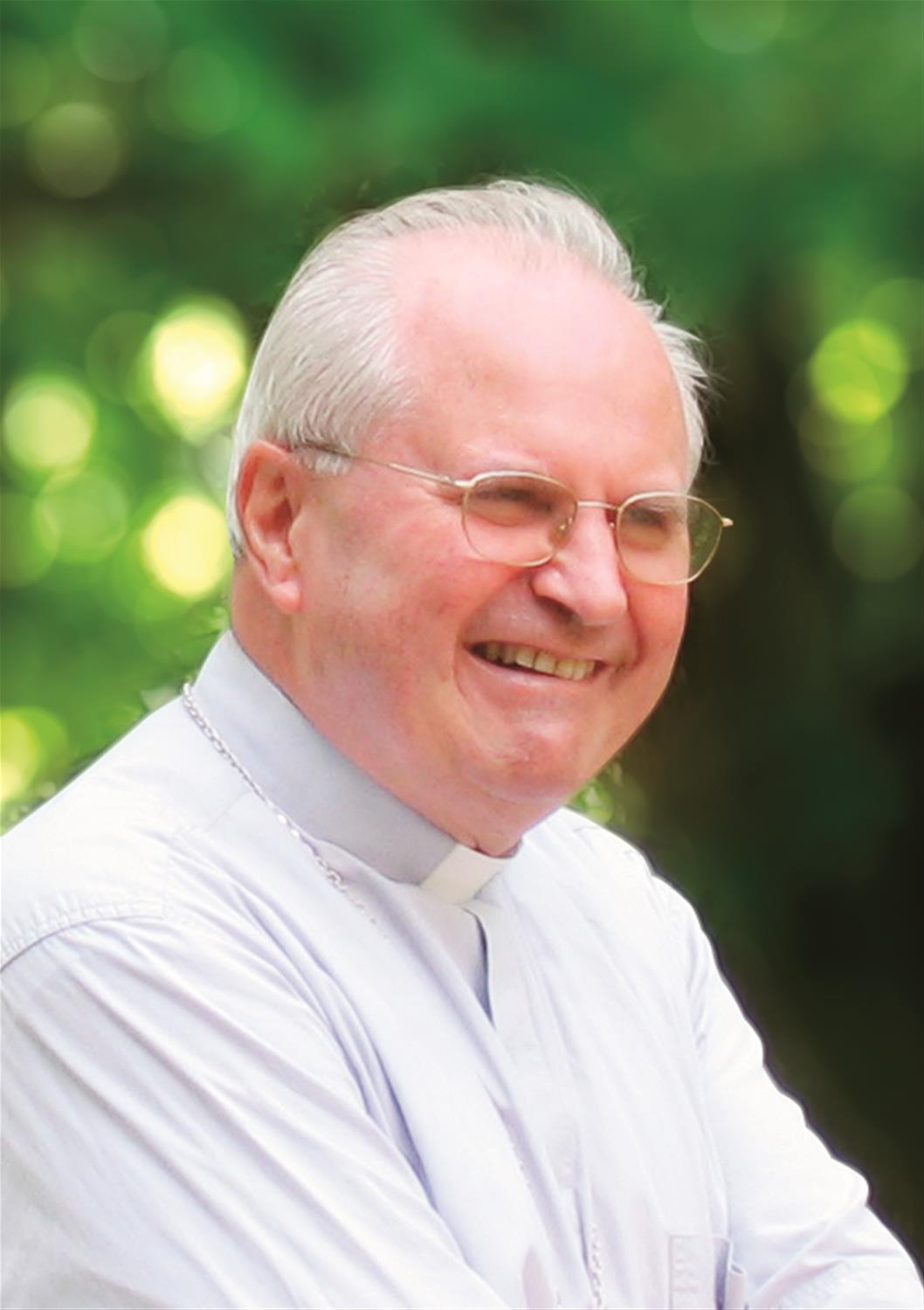
- Roman Catholic bishop of the Roman Catholic Diocese of Quimper, France
- Church: Roman Catholic Church
- See: Diocese of Quimper
- In office: 1989-2007
- Predecessor: Francis Barbu
- Successor: Jean-Marie Le Vert

Orders
- Ordination: 5 May 1957
- Consecration: 10 April 1988 by Francis Barbu
- Rank: Bishop

Personal details
- Born: 27 April 1932 Plessé, France
- Died: 9 July 2010 (aged 78) Redon, France

Clément Joseph Marie Raymond Guillon (27 April 1932 – 9 July 2010) was the Roman Catholic bishop of the Roman Catholic Diocese of Quimper, France.

Ordained to the priesthood on 5 May 1957, Guillon was made coadjutor bishop of the Quimper Diocese on 17 March 1988 and was ordained bishop on 10 April 1988. He became the diocesan bishop on 3 May 1989, retiring on 7 December 2007.
