= Fourmetot =

- Part of Le Perrey
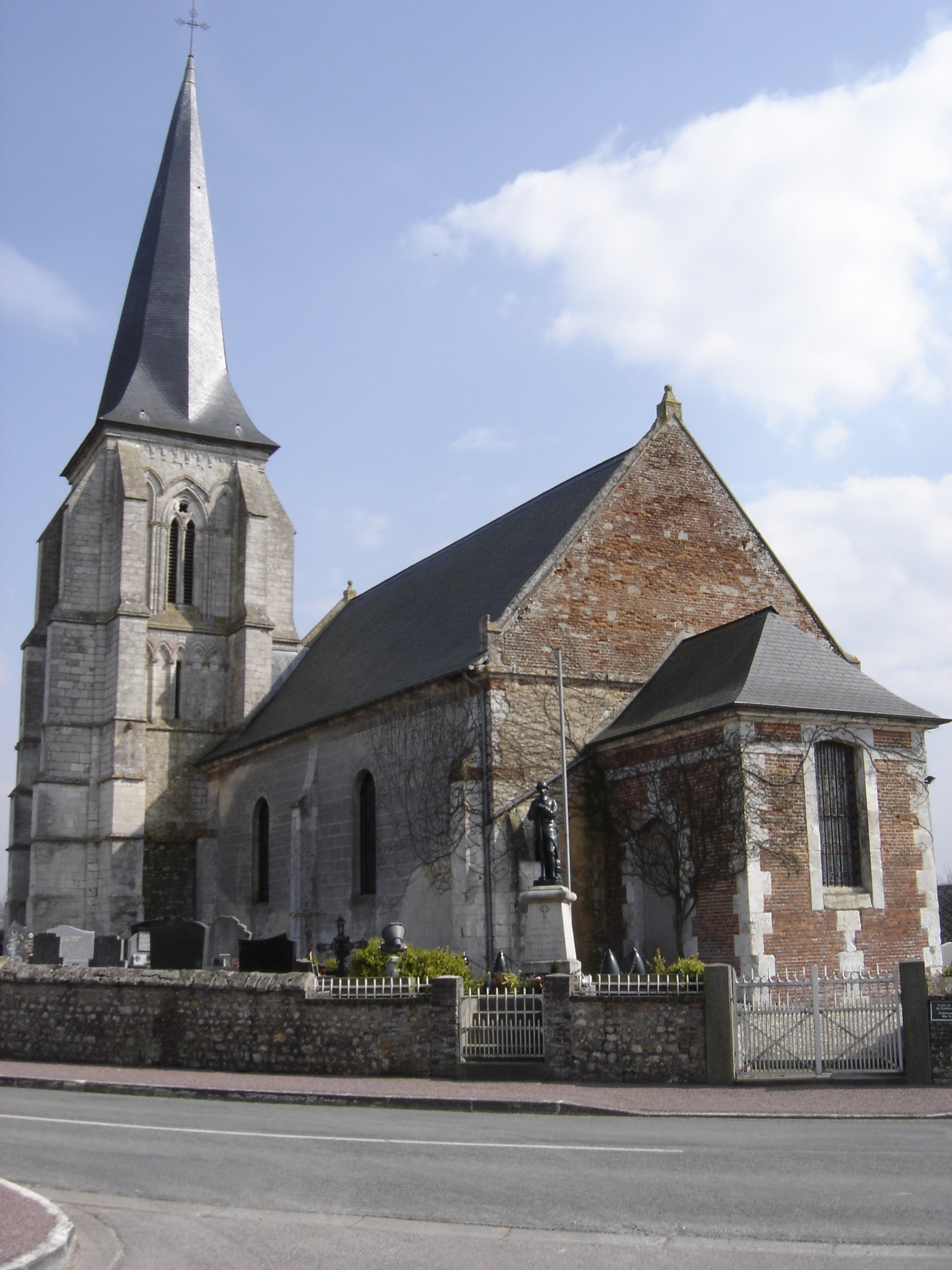
- The church in Fourmetot
- Location of Fourmetot
- Location within France Location within Normandy
- Coordinates: 49°22′56″N 0°34′22″E
- Country: France
- Region: Normandy
- Department: Eure
- Arrondissement: Bernay
- Canton: Pont-Audemer
- Commune: Le Perrey
- Area^{1}: 10.02 km^{2} (3.87 sq mi)
- Elevation: 127 m (417 ft)
- Highest elevation: 134 m (440 ft)
- Lowest elevation: 48 m (157 ft)
- Population (2023): 675
  - Density: 67.4/km^{2} (174/sq mi)
- Time zone: UTC+01:00 (CET)
  - Summer (DST): UTC+02:00 (CEST)
- Postal code: 27500
- ^{1} French Land Register data, which excludes lakes, ponds, glaciers > 1 km^{2} (0.386 sq mi or 247 acres) and river estuaries.

Fourmetot (French pronunciation: [fuʁməto]) is a former commune in the Eure department in the Normandy region in northern France. On 1 January 2019, it was merged into the new commune Le Perrey.

== See also ==
- Communes of the Eure department
