= Saint-Thurien, Finistère =

Saint-Thurien Sant-Turian
- Commune
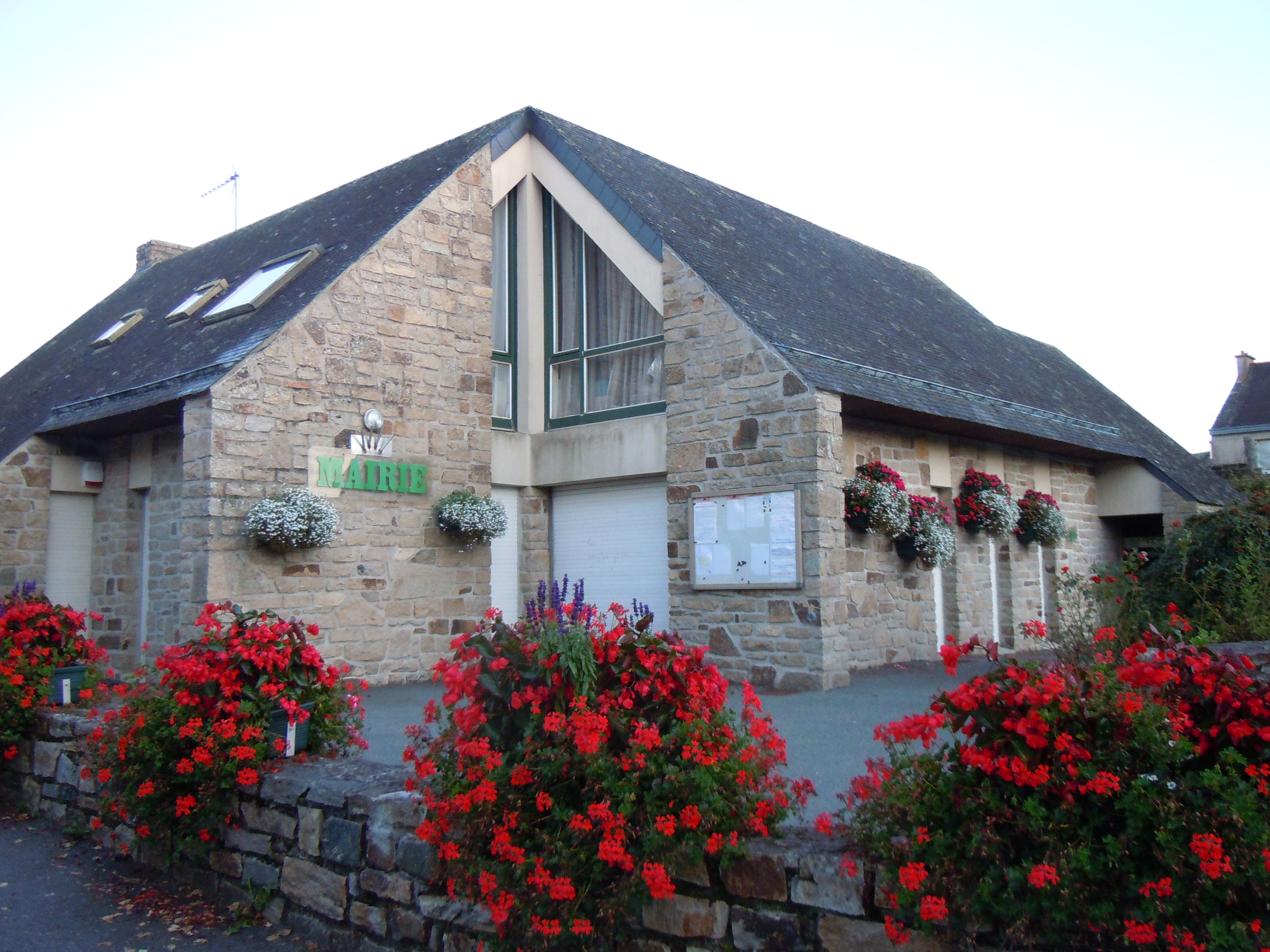
- The town hall in Saint-Thurien
- Location of Saint-Thurien
- Location within France Location within Brittany
- Coordinates: 47°57′36″N 3°37′21″W
- Country: France
- Region: Brittany
- Department: Finistère
- Arrondissement: Quimper
- Canton: Quimperlé
- Intercommunality: CA Quimperlé Communauté

Government
  - Mayor (2020–2026): Christine Kerdraon
- Area^{1}: 21.41 km^{2} (8.27 sq mi)
- Highest elevation: 166 m (545 ft)
- Lowest elevation: 22 m (72 ft)
- Population (2023): 1,000
  - Density: 47/km^{2} (120/sq mi)
- Time zone: UTC+01:00 (CET)
  - Summer (DST): UTC+02:00 (CEST)
- INSEE/Postal code: 29269 /29380
- ^{1} French Land Register data, which excludes lakes, ponds, glaciers > 1 km^{2} (0.386 sq mi or 247 acres) and river estuaries.

Saint-Thurien (French pronunciation: [sɛ̃ tyʁjɛ̃]; Breton: Sant-Turian) is a commune in the Finistère department of Brittany in north-western France.

It takes its name from Saint Turiaf of Dol, bishop of the ancient Diocese of Dol.

== Population ==
Inhabitants of Saint-Thurien are called in French Thuriennois.

Historical population

Year	Pop.	±% p.a.
1793	1,200	—
1800	1,260	+0.70%
1806	882	−5.77%
1821	972	+0.65%
1831	921	−0.54%
1836	1,088	+3.39%
1841	1,115	+0.49%
1846	1,115	+0.00%
1851	1,125	+0.18%
1856	1,091	−0.61%
1861	1,115	+0.44%
1866	1,200	+1.48%
1872	1,158	−0.59%
1876	1,219	+1.29%
1881	1,266	+0.76%
1886	1,423	+2.37%
1891	1,512	+1.22%
1896	1,656	+1.84%
1901	1,679	+0.28%

Year	Pop.	±% p.a.
1906	1,705	+0.31%
1911	1,791	+0.99%
1921	1,742	−0.28%
1926	1,627	−1.36%
1931	1,568	−0.74%
1936	1,509	−0.76%
1946	1,403	−0.73%
1954	1,264	−1.30%
1962	1,201	−0.64%
1968	1,054	−2.15%
1975	967	−1.22%
1982	925	−0.63%
1990	883	−0.58%
1999	843	−0.51%
2007	878	+0.51%
2012	1,011	+2.86%
2017	1,032	+0.41%
2023	1,000	−0.52%

Source: EHESS and INSEE (1968-2023)

== Geography ==
Saint-Thurien is located in the southeastern part of Finistère, 11 km (6.8 mi) northwest of Quimperlé, 30 km (19 mi) northwest of Lorient and 35 km (22 mi) east of Quimper. Historically, the town belongs to Cornouaille. It lies in the valley of the river Isole. Saint-Thurien is border by Guiscriff to the north, by Querrien to the east, by Mellac to the south and by Bannalec to the west. Apart from the village centre, there are about sixty hamlets.

== Map ==
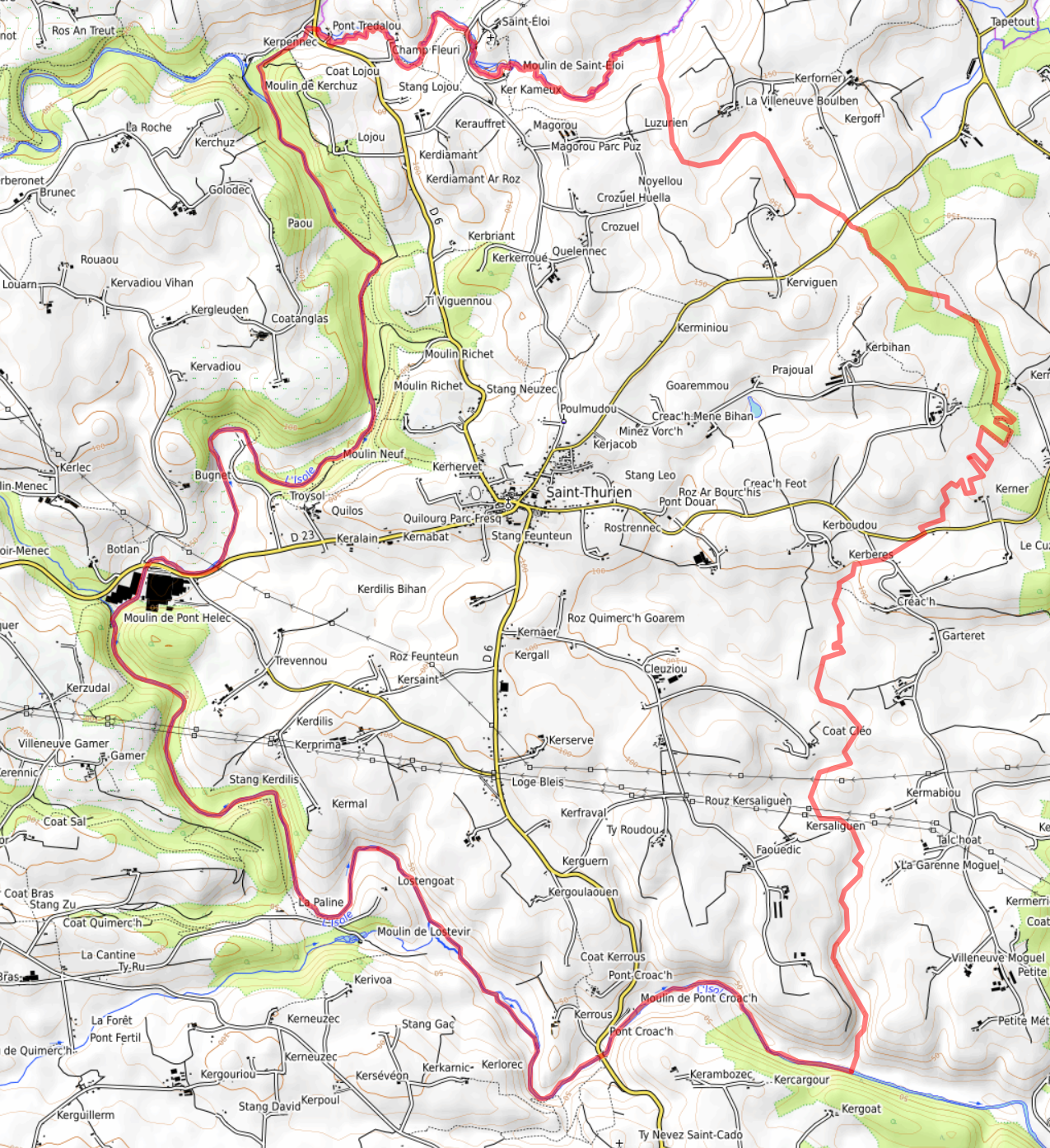
Topographic map

== List of places ==
- Champ Fleuri
- Coat Cleo
- Coat Kerroux
- Coat Pin
- Creach Feot
- Creach Mine
- Creach Mine Bihan
- Creach Quillierou
- Crozuel
- Crozuel Izella
- Faouedic (Little beech forest)
- Goaremmou (warrens)
- Helles
- Hent Karrig Kamm
- Ker Kerroue
- Keralain (Alan's village)
- Kerauffret
- Kerbail
- Kerbellec
- Kerberes
- Kerbihan
- Kerbiriou
- Kerboudou
- Kerboudou Vras
- Kerbras
- Kerbriand
- Kerdiamant
- Kerdilis
- Kerdilis Bihan
- Kerellen
- Kerfraval
- Kergac
- Kergall
- Kerganet
- Kerganet Bihan
- Kergoulaouen
- Kerguern
- Kerguyader (weaver's village)
- Kerhenry
- Kerhervet
- Kermal
- Kerminiou (Miniou's village)
- Kernabat
- Kerner
- Kerpichon
- Kerprima
- Kerroux
- Kersaint
- Kersaleguen
- Kerserve
- Kerveguen
- Kervennou
- Le Cleuziou (The moats)
- Le Guernic (The little alder forest)
- Les Salles
- Loj ar Bleiz
- Lojou (The huts)
- Luzurien
- Magorou (Ruined walls)
- Moulin de Pont Croach
- Moulin de Saint Eloi
- Moulin Kerchuz
- Moulin Neuf
- Moulin Richet
- Noyelou
- Pouillet
- Poulmoudou
- Prajoual
- Quelennec (Holly place)
- Quillos
- Rosquimerch
- Rostrennec (Brambles hill)
- Roué (Clearing)
- Roz Ar Bourhis
- Roz Fontaine
- Roz Roudou
- Rusuliec
- Stang Feunteun
- Stang Kerdilin
- Stang Leon
- Stang Lojou
- Stang Neuzec
- Trevennou
- Troysol (Isole valley)
- Ty Roudou
- Ty Viguennou (Viguennou's house)

== History ==
The parish church was rebuilt at the end of the nineteenth century in accordance with the architect Joseph Bigot's plans. The new church replaced an older church that dated from the sixteenth century.

== Economy ==
The Peny factory, located on the banks of the river Isole, with 340 employees, in the main employer in the town.

== International relations ==
Since 1995, it is twinned with the village of Kilmacow in County Kilkenny, Ireland (Republic of Ireland) .

== Gallery ==
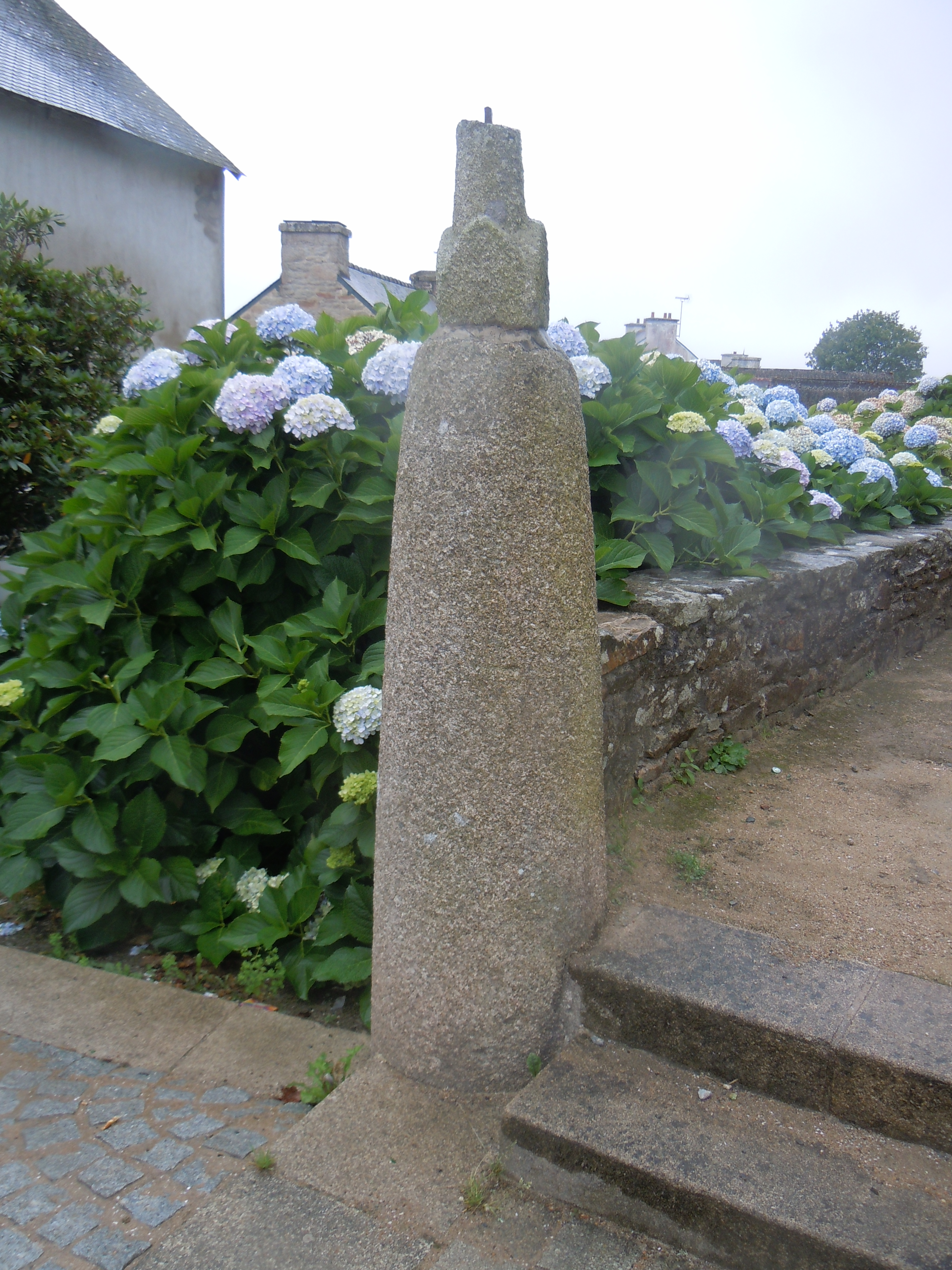
The Iron Age stele that stands in the church square

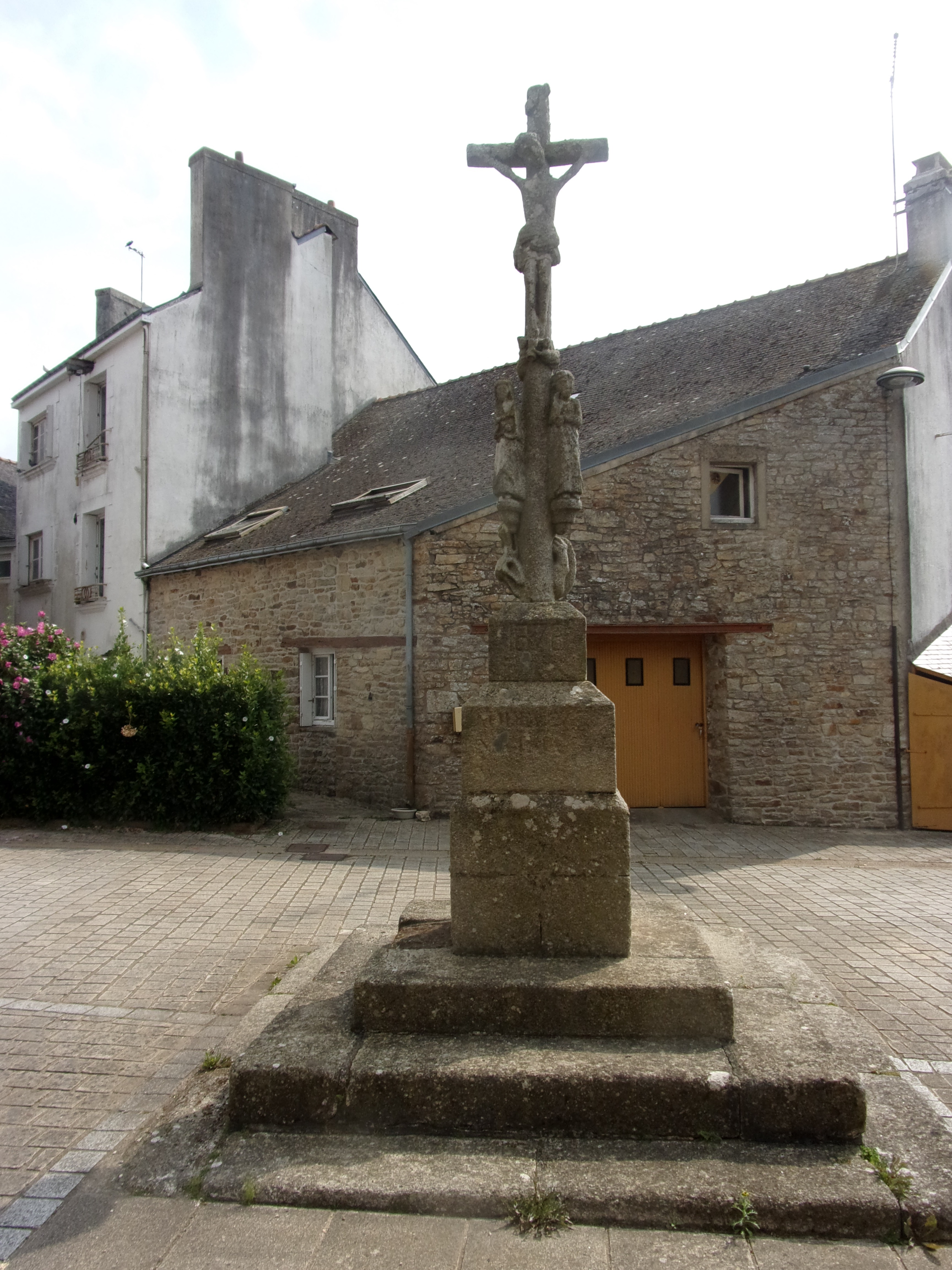
The calvary that stands in the church square

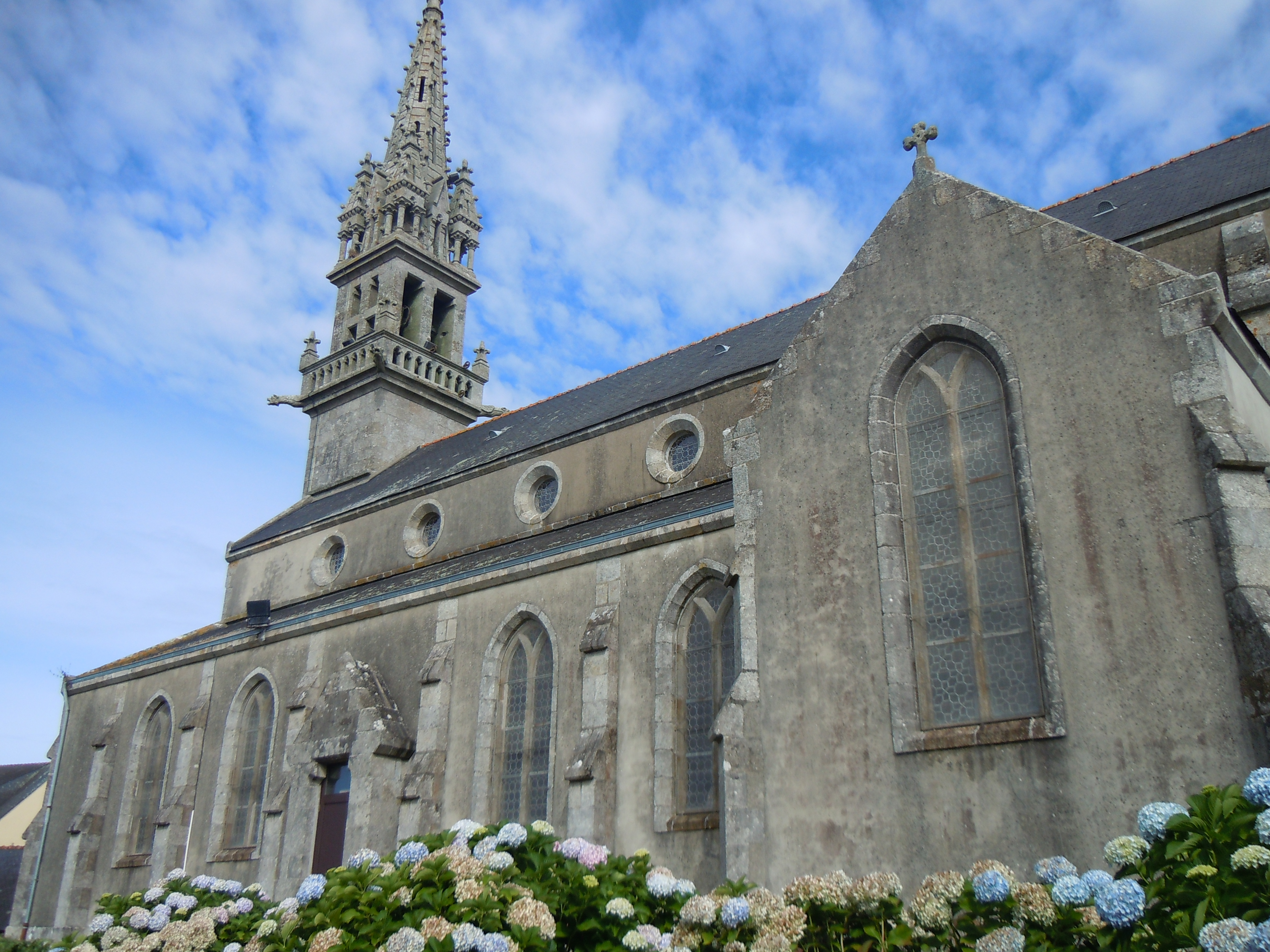
The neo-Gothic parish church

== See also ==
- Communes of the Finistère department
- Entry on sculptor of Saint Thurien war memorial Jean Joncourt
