= Pierre-Vincent Dombidau de Crouseilles =

- Bishop
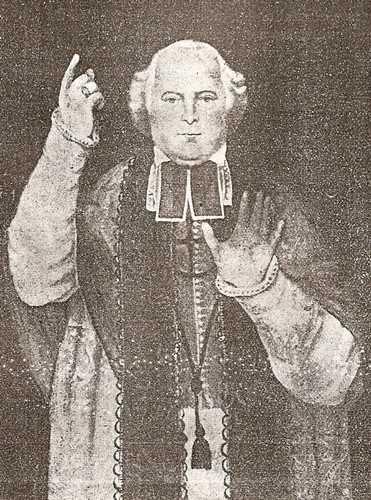
- Church: Roman Catholic Church
- Diocese: Diocese of Quimper
- Predecessor: Claude André
- Successor: Jean-Marie-Dominique de Poulpiquet de Brescanvel

Orders
- Ordination: December 21, 1775
- Consecration: April 21, 1805

Personal details
- Born: July 19, 1751 Pau, France
- Died: June 28, 1823 (aged 71) Quimper, France
- Coat of arms

Pierre-Vincent Dombidau de Crouseilles, sometimes spelled Pierre-Vincent Dombideau de Crouseilhes, was a French Catholic bishop born on July 19, 1751, in Pau, France, and died on June 28, 1823, in Quimper. He served as the Bishop of Quimper from 1805 to 1823.

== Biography ==
=== Early life and clerical beginnings ===
Pierre-Vincent Dombidau de Crouseilles was born in Pau on July 19, 1751. He was the son of Jean de Dombidau, a counselor at the Parlement of Navarre, baron of Crouseilles, and a member of the Estates of Béarn.

He studied at the Saint-Sulpice Seminary in Paris beginning in 1770 and obtained his degree in theology in 1778.

Ordained a priest on December 23, 1775, he benefited from his father's connections to secure lucrative benefices. He became a canon of Lescar, where the bishop Marc-Antoine de Noé was a relative, and held priories in Cambon (Diocese of Rodez) and Lieu-Dieu (Diocese of Amiens).

In 1788, he was appointed canon and Vicar General of Aix-en-Provence by Archbishop Jean de Dieu-Raymond de Boisgelin de Cucé. During the French Revolution, he emigrated to England with his bishop, avoiding the requirement to take the oath.

=== Rebuilding the episcopate ===
Under the Consulate, he returned to France, serving in Aix-en-Provence and later following Boisgelin de Cucé as Vicar General of the Archdiocese of Tours in 1802.

He collaborated with Jean-Étienne-Marie Portalis, Director of Religious Affairs, contributing to the compilation of the episcopal candidates of 1802, where he himself was a recommended candidate.

=== Bishop of Quimper ===
Dombidau de Crouseilles was appointed Bishop of Quimper on January 30, 1805. He was consecrated on April 21, 1805, at Notre-Dame Cathedral, Paris. As a Béarnais, his appointment aligned with Napoleon's policy of appointing non-Bretons to Breton dioceses.

He encouraged religious education in the diocese, supported interior missions, and increased priestly vocations, ordaining nearly 170 priests between 1805 and 1815.

Dombidau de Crouseilles was hesitant to publish the Imperial Catechism but participated in the Council of Paris (1811) and remained loyal to the Empire. After the fall of Napoleon, he aligned with Louis XVIII and declined the Archbishopric of Rouen in 1823, shortly before his death on June 28, 1823, in Quimper.

== Coat of arms ==
"D'argent à l'arbre de sinople terrassé de sable au lion de gueules passant sur la terrasse, au chef d'azur chargé de 3 étoiles d'or."
