= Saint-Ouen-des-Champs =

- Part of Le Perrey
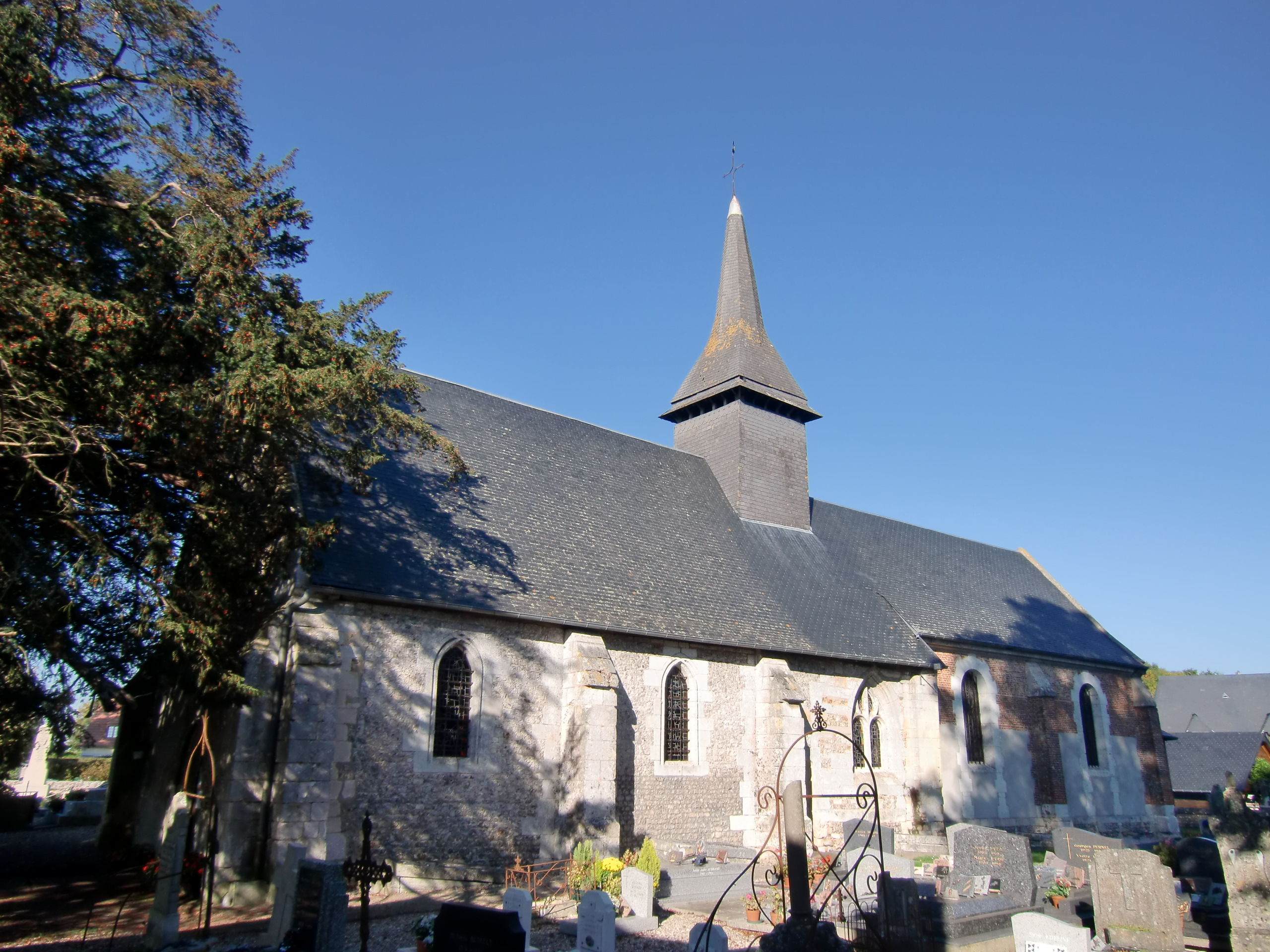
- Location of Saint-Ouen-des-Champs
- Location within France Location within Normandy
- Coordinates: 49°23′31″N 0°32′27″E
- Country: France
- Region: Normandy
- Department: Eure
- Arrondissement: Bernay
- Canton: Bourg-Achard
- Commune: Le Perrey
- Area^{1}: 6.11 km^{2} (2.36 sq mi)
- Elevation: 135 m (443 ft)
- Highest elevation: 134 m (440 ft)
- Lowest elevation: 2 m (6.6 ft)
- Population (2023): 309
  - Density: 50.6/km^{2} (131/sq mi)
- Time zone: UTC+01:00 (CET)
  - Summer (DST): UTC+02:00 (CEST)
- Postal code: 27680
- ^{1} French Land Register data, which excludes lakes, ponds, glaciers > 1 km^{2} (0.386 sq mi or 247 acres) and river estuaries.

Saint-Ouen-des-Champs (pronounced [sɛ̃t‿wɛ̃ de ʃɑ̃]) is a former commune in the Eure department, Normandy, northern France. On 1 January 2019, it was merged into the new commune Le Perrey.

== See also ==
- Communes of the Eure department
