= Guy of Roye =

French prelate

Guy de Roye (died 1409) was a French prelate.

== Biography ==
Originating from a noble house in Picardy, he attached himself to the Avignon popes Clement VII and Benedict XIII. He was bishop of Verdun, Castres, and then Dol before becoming archbishop of Tours and of Sens. He finally became archbishop of Reims in 1390. He founded the collège de Reims in Paris, facing the collège Sainte-Barbe. He got into a quarrel with the marshals of Volti, near Gênes, on his way to the council of Pisa with Louis I of Bar and Pierre d'Ailly, leading to a riot in which Guy was killed by a crossbow bolt.

== Sources ==
- Fisquet, Honoré (1864). La France pontificale (Gallia Christiana): Metropole de Reims: Reims (in French). Paris: Etienne Repos. pp. 132–135.
- Sainte-Marthe, Denis de (1751). Gallia christiana, in provincias ecclesiasticas distributa (in Latin). Vol. Tomus nonus (9): de provincia Remensi. Paris: ex Typographia regia. pp. 132–133.
- (in French) "Guy de Roye", in Marie-Nicolas Bouillet and Alexis Chassang (dir.), Dictionnaire universel d'histoire et de géographie, 1878
