= Miles Chapin =

American actor and sales consultant

Miles Whitworth Chapin (born December 6, 1954) is an American actor and sales consultant.

== Life and career ==
Chapin was born in New York City, New York, the son of Betty (née Steinway), a descendant of Henry E. Steinway (the founder of Steinway & Sons), and Schuyler Chapin, an author who was the General Manager of the Metropolitan Opera. He made his Broadway debut in Summer Brave in 1975.

In addition to his acting career, Chapin has worked in recent years as a sales consultant for Steinway & Sons Piano manufacturers. He and his father have returned to the familial business in recent years. Chapin's father was the Commissioner of Cultural Affairs of New York City for eight years under Mayor Rudolph Giuliani and has been a major force in the arts having acted as director of such important venues as the Metropolitan Opera, and The Lincoln Center for the Performing Arts.

Chapin has twin brothers who are a bit older, and an eldest brother Henry Chapin six years Miles' senior, who was featured in 1961 as the child narrator in the recording of Benjamin Britten's "The Young Person's Guide to the Orchestra," conducted by Leonard Bernstein. Henry Chapin is a cellist and a music educator in New York City.

Chapin has published two non-fiction books, Tales From The Jungle (Crown, 1995) and 88 Keys (Clarkson Potter, 1997) in addition to numerous magazine articles for Saveur, Garden Design, Quest, Cigar Aficionado, and Steinway & Sons Magazine. He was the recipient of a James Beard award in 2005 for an article in Saveur about Lüchow's restaurant.

Chapin owns the film rights to Ain’t No Sin to Rock and Roll, a novel by author Donald Gallinger, although has not released any plans for this film to the public yet.

== Filmography ==
- Ladybug Ladybug - (Joel / 1963)
- Bless the Beasts and Children - (Shecker / 1971 / Columbia Pictures)
- To Find a Man - (Pete / 1972 / Columbia Pictures)
- French Postcards - (Joel / 1979 / Paramount Pictures)
- Hair - (Steve / 1979 / United Artists)
- Buddy Buddy - (Eddie the Bellhop / 1981 / Metro-Goldwyn-Mayer)
- The Funhouse - (Richie / 1981 / Universal Studios)
- Pandemonium - (Andy Jackson / 1982 / United Artists)
- The Funny Farm - (Mark Champlin / 1982 / Mutual General Film Company)
- Get Crazy - (Sammy Fox / 1983 /)
- Howard the Duck - (Carter / 1986 / Universal Studios)
- Howard the Duck - (Advisor - duck coach) / 1986)
- Murder, She Wrote - Deadpan (Walter Knapf / 1988)
- Young Goodman Brown - (Joseph Ring / 1994)
- The Associate - (Harry / 1996 / Hollywood Pictures)
- The People vs. Larry Flynt - (Miles / 1996 / Columbia Pictures)
- Hudson River Blues - (Ben / 1997)
- Man on the Moon - (SNL Assistant / 1999 / Universal Studios)
- The Photographer - (Steve / 2000)
