= Alain of Quimper =

6/7 century Bishop

Saint Alain of Quimper (Alan in Breton) was the Bishop of Cornouaille and the fourth Bishop of Quimper. He is believed to have been born in the British Isles. He was Bishop in the sixth or seventh century. His existence is historically uncertain.

The sources proving his existence are questionable. He is not included in the list of Quimper dating from the fourteenth century nor in that of Quimperlé which gives the list of the first bishops of Quimper. On the other hand he is mentioned by Dom Lobineau in Breton and the Latin Hours in 1486 under the name of Alaini episcopi. Holweck identifies him with Saint Allor.

Be that as it may, he is venerated in Brittany.

== Sources ==
- GrandTerrier
