= Turiaf of Dol =

Breton abbot and bishop

Saint Turiaf Bishop of Dol
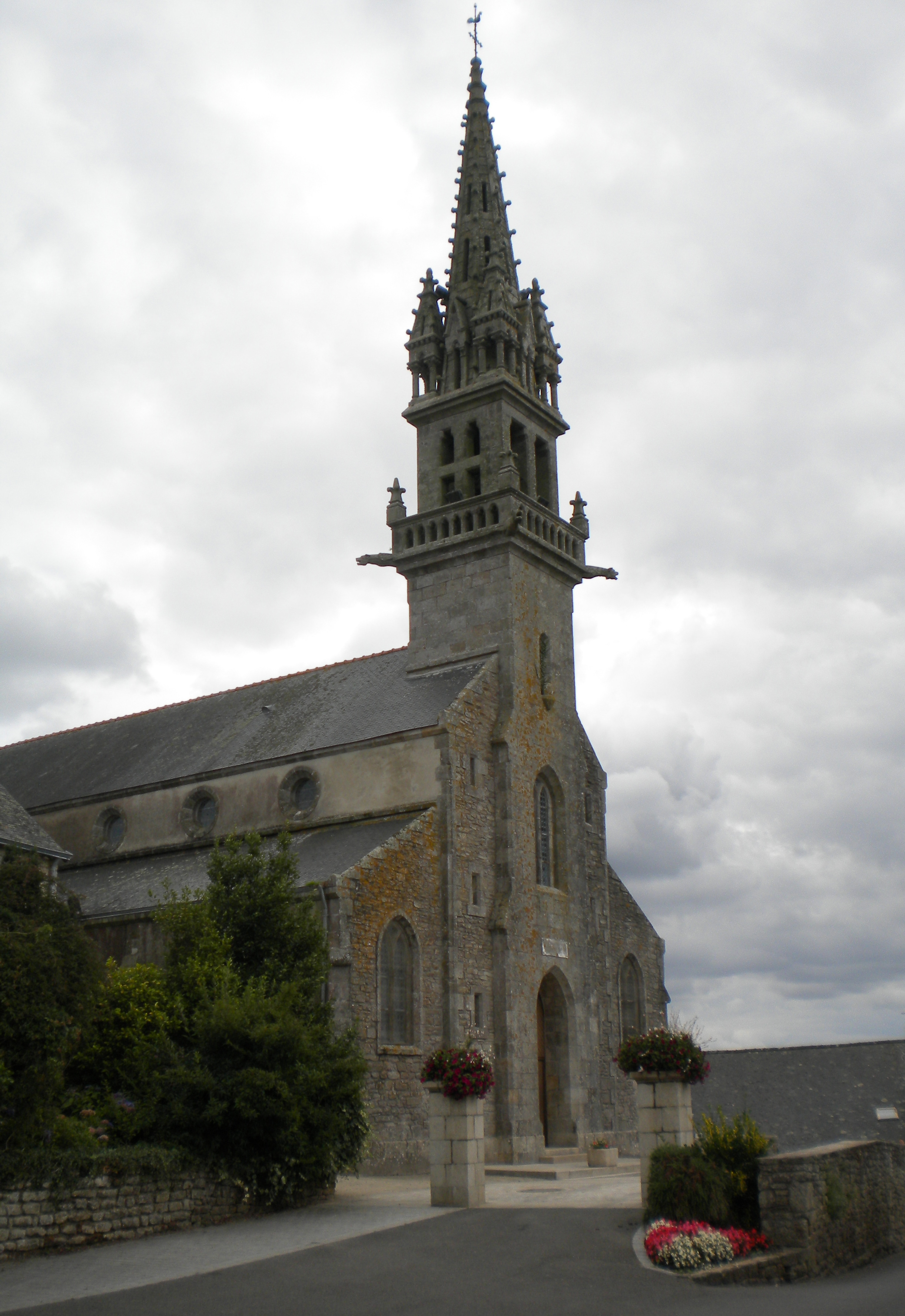
- Église Saint-Thurien in Saint-Thurien, Finistère
- Born: Brittany, France
- Residence: Dol in Brittany, France.
- Died: c. 750
- Feast: 13 July

Saint Turiaf of Dol (or Thivisiau, Thurian, Thurien, Tuien, Turian, Turiano, Turianus, Turiav, Turiave, Turiavo, Turiavus, Turien; died c. 750) was a Breton abbot and bishop of the ancient Diocese of Dol.

== Life ==
Turiaf was born in Brittany to French nobility in the 8th century. He became a monk, abbot and priest. Saint Sampson ordained him. He was appointed Bishop of Dol in Brittany, France. His feast day is 13 July.

== Monks of Ramsgate account ==
The Monks of Ramsgate wrote in their Book of Saints (1921),

Turiaf (Turianus) (St.) Bp. (July 13)
(8th cent.) A Breton Saint, successor in the Episcopate of Saint Samson of Dol. He was an energetic and courageous Pastor of souls. He entered into eternal rest about A.D. 750.

== Butler's account ==
The hagiographer Alban Butler (1710–1773) wrote in his Lives of the Fathers, Martyrs, and Other Principal Saints,

Saint Turiaf, Bishop of Dol, in Brittany

Called often Turiave, sometimes Thivisiau.

He was born in the diocess of Vannes, in the neighbourhood of the abbey of Ballon, near which Charles the Bald was defeated by the Britons in 845; in which war this monastery seems to have been destroyed. Turiaf went young to Dol, was instructed in piety and learning, and promoted to holy orders by Saint Thiarmail, abbot of Saint Samson's and bishop of Dol. This prelate afterwards appointed him his vicar and chorepiscopus, and at his death, probably in 733, our saint was placed in that episcopal chair. Admirable was the austerity of his life, his zeal, his charity, his watchfulness, his fervour in prayer, and his firmness in maintaining discipline. A powerful lord named Rivallon having committed many acts of violence, the bishop went to his castle at Lanncafrut, and by his strong remonstrances made him sensible of the enormity of his crimes. By the bishop's injunction he underwent a canonical penance during seven years, and repaired all injustices and oppressions by a sevenfold satisfaction. Saint Turiaf died on the 13th of July, probably about the year 749, though even the age is not certain. In the wars of the Normans his relics were brought to Paris and are still kept in the abbey of Saint Germain-des-Prez. The new Paris breviary mentions that dreadful fires have been sometimes miraculously extinguished by them. The life of Saint Turiaf, written in the tenth century, is a confused eulogium, in which prodigies take place of facts. The notes of the Bollandists are incomparably more valuable than the text, ad 13 Jul. p. 614.

== Sources ==
- Butler, Alban (2020), The Lives of the Fathers, Martyrs, and Other Principal Saints, vol. 7, BoD – Books on Demand, ISBN 9783752345612 This article incorporates text from this source, which is in the public domain.
- "Saint Turiaf of Dol", CatholicSaints.info
- St. Augustine's Abbey, Ramsgate (1921). The Book of saints : a dictionary of servants of God canonized by the Catholic Church. London: A. & C. Black, ltd. OCLC 671676136. This article incorporates text from this source, which is in the public domain.
