= Ancient Diocese of Dol =

Roman Catholic diocese in France (848 - 1801)

Coordinates: 48.55°N 1.76°W

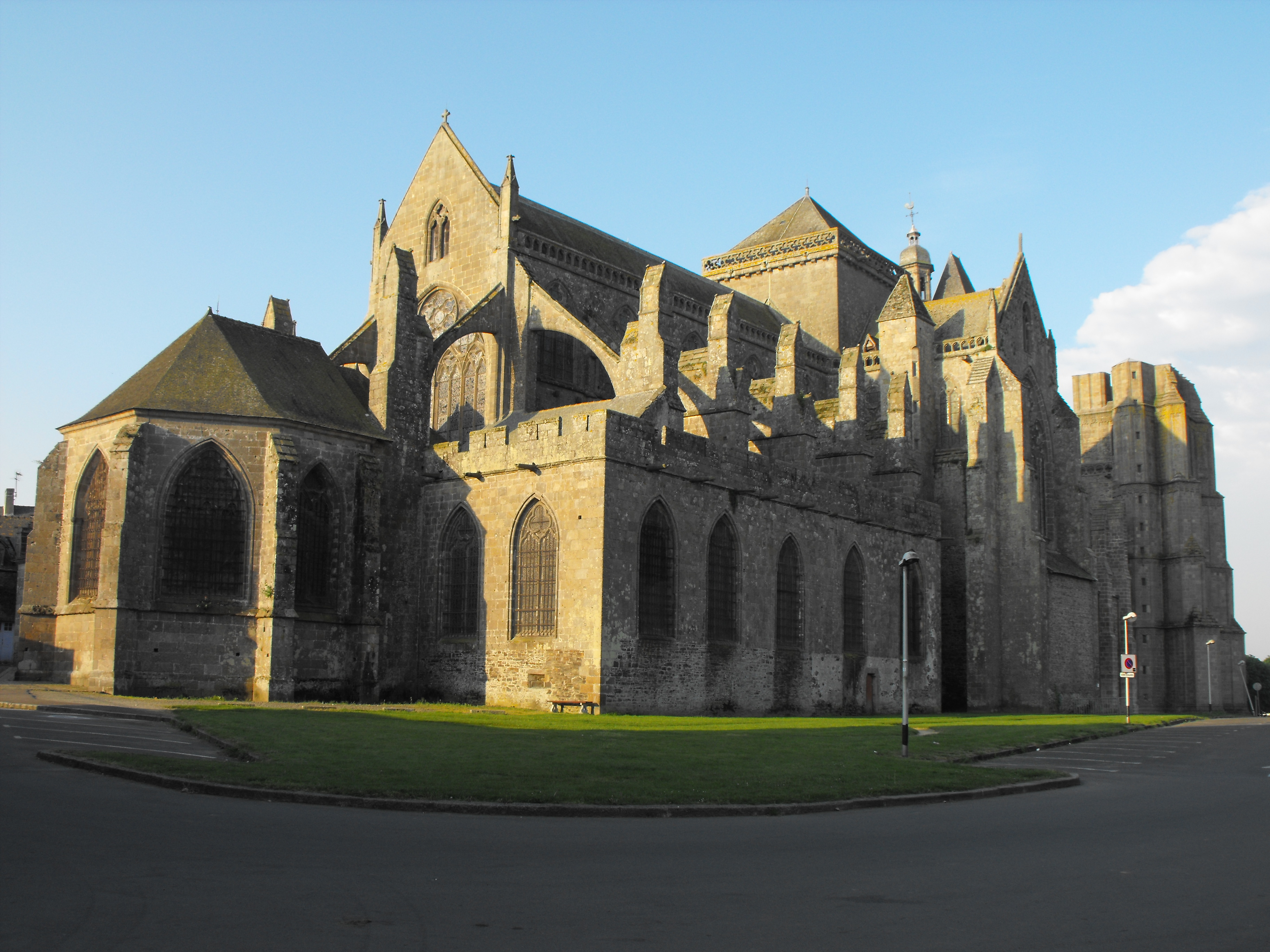
Cathedral of S. Samson, Dol

The Breton and French Catholic diocese of Dol, situated in the northern part of the department of Ille-et-Vilaine, 6 km (3.8 mi) from the English Channel coast and 22 km (14 mi) southeast of Saint-Malo, existed from 848 until the French Revolution. It was suppressed by the Concordat of 1801.

The seat of the bishop was the cathedral of Saint Samson. Its scattered territory (deriving from the holdings of the Celtic monastery, and including an enclave at the mouth of the Seine) was shared mainly by the Diocese of Rennes and the Diocese of Saint-Brieuc.

== History ==
The Life of St. Samson, which cannot be of earlier date than the seventh century, mentions the foundation of the monastery of Dol by Samson of Dol. Georges Goyau speculates that Samson was most likely already a bishop when he arrived in Armorica from Great Britain, but finds no evidence in the Life that Samson founded the See of Dol or became its first bishop.

In the twelfth century, to support its claim against the Metropolitan of Tours, the Church of Dol produced the names of a long list of archbishops: St. Samson, St. Magloire, St. Budoc, St. Génevée, St. Restoald, St. Armel, St. Jumael, St. Turian. Louis Duchesne discounted and doubted this list. He was of the opinion that the abbey of Dol may have had at its head from time to time abbots with episcopal jurisdiction, but that Dol was not the seat of a diocese.

Under Charlemagne and Louis the Pious, the Vicariate of Dol and the monastery of St. Méen were still included in the Diocese of Aleth; so that the first Bishop of Dol was Festianus (Festgen) mentioned for the first time between 851 and 857, and installed by King Nomenoë.

Among the bishops of Dol are:

- Baldric of Dol (1107–30), author of a Latin poem on the conquest of England by William the Conqueror, the Historia Hierosolymitana, 123 poems, lives of several persons, and other works. When still Abbot of Borgueil, Baldric was accused of simony by Bishop Ivo of Chartres, for having attempted to bribe his way into the bishopric of Orleans in 1096. He held a diocesan synod in 1128, attended by a papal legate, Gerard Bishop of Angoulême.
- Alain de Coëtivy (1456–74) had been Bishop of Avignon since 30 October 1437, and a cardinal since 20 December 1448. He was named bishop of Dol on 18 June 1456 by Pope Calixtus III Since he would not personally take up episcopal functions in Dol, he had Bishop Ambroise de Cameraco of Alet appointed his coadjutor. He was sent as legate of Pope Callistus to France, to persuade King Charles VII of France to participate in a crusade to assist the Greeks against the Turks who had seized Constantinople.

=== Metropolitans ===
There was a struggle from the ninth to the eleventh century to free the Church of Brittany from the Metropolitan of Tours. From a comparison made by Duchesne between the Life of St. Conwoïon, the Indiculus de episcoporum Britonum depositione, and an almost completely restored letter of Pope Leo IV, it would appear that shortly before 850, Nomenoë wishing to be anointed king, and finding opposition among the prelates of Brittany, sought to get rid of them by charging them with simony. Their only real fault was perhaps that they demanded eulogia from their priests when the latter came to synods. After listening to a deputation of Breton bishops and to St. Conwoïon, founder of the Abbey of St-Sauveur at Redon, who had been sent to Rome by Nomenoë, Leo IV declared that the charge of simony must be adjudicated by a competent tribunal of twelve bishops, and must be attested by seventy-two witnesses, thereby disputing Nomenoë's claim to a right to depose bishops. But Nomenoë did depose, and in a brutal manner, the four bishops of Vannes, Aleth, Quimper, and St. Pol de Léon, and made seven dioceses out of their four. One of the new dioceses had its seat in the abbey of Dol and became straightway an archdiocese. The other two dioceses were established in the monasteries of St. Brieuc and Tréguier (Pabu-Tutual).

In Autumn 849, the bishops of the four provinces of Tours, Sens, Reims, and Rouen, wrote a letter of reprimand to Nomenoë and threatened him with excommunication. He paid no heed to them, and died 7 March 851.

Salomon, Nomenoë's second successor, requested Pope Benedict IV to regularize the situation of the Breton hierarchy, but was unsuccessful. He tried again in 865 with Pope Nicholas I, who replied on 26 May 865 that he would not send the pallium to Bishop Festinianus of Dol, unless he could prove that it had been granted to his predecessors. In the name of the Council of Savonnières (859) the seven metropolitans of the three kingdoms of Charles the Bald, of Lothair II, and of Charles of Provence, wrote to the Bishop of Rennes and to the bishops occupying the new Sees of Dol, St. Brieuc, and Tréguier, reproaching them with lack of obedience to the Metropolitan of Tours. This letter was not sent to the Bishops of Vannes, Quimper, Aleth, and St. Pol de Léon who wrongly occupied the sees of the legitimate bishops illegally deposed by Nomenoë. It achieved nothing.

In 862 Salomon dealt directly with Pope Nicholas I, and at first tried to mislead the pope by means of false allegations and forgeries; then he restored Felix of Quimper and Liberalis of Léon to their sees, but still kept Susannus of Vannes and Salocon of Aleth in exile. Nicholas I died in 867. Pope Adrian II (867–72) and Pope John VIII (872–82) continued to uphold the rights of the Metropolitan of Tours. Following the deaths of Salomon and of Susannus, a conciliatory atmosphere developed.

==== 12th century struggle ====
There was never a formal act on the part of the Holy See recognizing Dol as a new metropolitan church. Dol never had control over Rennes or Nantes, and it was mainly over the new Sees of St. Brieuc and Tréguier that it exercised ascendancy, if not canonical authority. On 15 May 1144, Pope Lucius II issued yet another bull, "Quae iudicii veritate," in which he repeated the rulings of his predecessors Nicholas, John, Leo IX, Gregory VII, and Urban II, that Dol and all the other dioceses of Brittany must recognize Tours as their metropolitan. After the death of Bishop Roland of Dol, no bishop of Dol should aspire to the use of the pallium. Pope Lucius was generous to Bishop Gaufridus, the current bishop of Dol, however, ruling that he could keep the pallium, but that none of his successors should have it. On the same day, Lucius II issued an order to the bishops of Saint-Brieuc and Tréguier, releasing them from any obedience to the bishop of Dol, and ordering their obedience to the metropolitan of Tours. On 3 March 1154, Pope Anastasius IV made the same ruling in favor of the metropolitan of Tours.

Finally in a bull of 1 June 1199, Pope Innocent III restored the old order of things, and subordinated anew all the dioceses of Brittany to the metropolitan of Tours; he did not, however, interfere with the diocesan boundaries set up by Nomenoë, which remained in force until the Revolution. The Bishop of Dol retained until 1789 the title and insignia of an archbishop, but without an archbishop's privileges or an ecclesiastical province.

=== Concordat of Bologna ===
In 1516, following the papal loss of the Battle of Marignano, Pope Leo X signed a concordat with King Francis I of France, removing the rights of all French entities which held the right to elect to a benefice, including bishoprics, canonicates, and abbeys, and granting the kings of France the right to nominate candidates to all these benefices, provided they be suitable persons; each nominee was subject to confirmation by the pope. This concordat removed the right of cathedral chapters to elect their bishop, or even to request the pope to name a bishop. The Concordat of Bologna was strongly protested by the University of Paris and by the Parliament of Paris. The agreement was put to the test at Dol in 1522, following the deaths of Pope Leo X on 1 December 1521, and of Archbishop Geoffrey de Coetmoisan on 10 (or 24) December 1521.

The new pope, Adrian VI, was in Spain, acting as Regent for the Emperor Charles V and Grand Inquisitor, when he was elected on 9 January 1522. He did not arrive in Rome until August, where he was confronted by a raging pestilence, which kept papal business to a minimum until Spring 1523. In the consistory of 29 June 1523, he appointed Thomas le Roy to the vacant see of Dol. Thomas was a native of Messe (diocese of Rennes), and held the degree of Doctor in utroque iure; he was named archdeacon of Ploughastel (diocese of Treguier) and master of requests in the council of Brittany. He was sent by Queen Anne of France to Rome on royal business, where Pope Julius II and Pope Leo X made him a cleric of the Apostolic Chamber (Treasury), secretary of briefs, and president of apostolic letters. He was papal procurator at the Fifth Lateran Council (1512–1517). In May 1522, he received a patent of nobility from King Francis, but when the king heard about his appointment to Dol without having received the royal nomination, he refused to accept the appointment and archbishop-elect Thomas never entered the diocese. He was still in Rome on 27 July 1524, when Pope Clement VII wrote to the king, saying that he could not confirm the royal nomination of François de Laval, since Adrian VI had appointed Thomas Regis (le Roy). Thomas died shortly thereafter, never having been consecrated a bishop.

In the consistory of 26 August 1524, Pope Clement VII appointed Joannes Staphileo as archbishop of Dol, but Joannes did not receive possession of the diocese, and his bulls were not sent. He died on 22 July 1528. On 23 November 1524, sede vacante, the canons of the cathedral of Dol appointed a procurator to the Estates of Brittany. Following the death of Stephileo, in the consistory of 6 November 1528, Pope Clement appointed King Francis' nominee, François de Laval, to the post of archbishop of Dol, despite his youth and illegitimacy. He was consecrated a bishop on 10 December 1530.

=== Seminary ===
The diocesan major seminary was established by Archbishop Jean-François de Chamillart (1692–1702) in 1701. It was abolished by the National Constituent Assembly in 1790, and its property seized and sold "for the benefit of the people." The buildings survived, however, and became a hospital, staffed after the restoration, by the Dames de Saint-Thomas-de-Villeneuve.

=== French Revolution ===
Formed from the National Assembly on 9 July 1789 during the first stages of the French Revolution, the National Constituent Assembly ordered the replacement of political subdivisions of the ancien régime with subdivisions called "departments", to be characterized by a single administrative city in the center of a compact area. The decree was passed on 22 December 1789, the boundaries fixed on 26 February 1790, with the institution to be effective on 4 March 1790. The territory of Dol was assigned to the Departement d' Ille-et-Vilaine, with its administrative center at Rennes. The National Constituent Assembly then, on 6 February 1790, instructed its ecclesiastical committee to prepare a plan for the reorganization of the clergy. At the end of May, its work was presented as a draft Civil Constitution of the Clergy, which, after vigorous debate, was approved on 12 July 1790. There was to be one diocese in each department, requiring the suppression of approximately fifty dioceses. The diocese of Dol was an obvious target, given the relatively small population, its scattered territories, and its strongly royalist stance. The suppression of ecclesiastical dioceses by the state was uncanonical.

In 1801, when Pope Pius VII restored the hierarchy in France, the diocese of Dol was not restored. Its scattered territories were distributed among the dioceses of Rennes and other dioceses.

=== Modern survival ===
By a papal brief of Pope Leo XIII, dated 13 February 1880, the archbishops of Rennes were permitted to add to their title the titles of Dol and Saint-Malo.

== Bishops ==
=== To 1000 ===
- 548-565: Samson of Dol
- c. 565 -568: Magloire
- c. 568-595: Budoc
- 595-620 Geneve
- 620-630.: Leucher or Leucherus
- 630-640.: Tiernmael or Tigerinomal
- c. 640-650: Restoald
- c. 650-700: Wral
- c. 700-718: Turiau, Thuriau or Thurian
- 718-736 Geneve
- 736-754 Restoald
- 754-770 Armael
- c. 770-842: Jumel, Jumael or Junemenus
- c. 842-848: Haelrit
- c. 848-859: Salacon or Salocon
- c. 859–869: Festien or Festianus
- c. 874–878: Mohen
- Lowenan
- c. 930: Agan
- c. 950–952: Jutohen, Juthoven or Wichoen
- c. 990: Mayn II

=== 1000 to 1300 ===
- c. 1030–1032 : Jungoneus
- 1040–c. 1076 : Juhel
- c. 1076: Gilduin
- 1076–1081 : Ivon
- 1082–1092: Johannes
- c. 1093 to c. 1100: Roland (I.)
- c. 1106: Johannes (II)
- c. 1107: Ulgrin or Vulgrin
- 1107–1130 : Baldric of Dol
- 1130–1146 : Geoffroi Le Roux
- c. 1147–1154: Olivier
- 1154–1161: Hugues Le Roux
- 1161–1163: Roger du Homet
- 1163–c. 1177: Jean (III)
- 1177–c. 1187: Rolandus (II).
- c. 1187–1188: Henri I.
- 1189–1190: Jean de Vaulnoise
- 1190–1199: Jean de La Mouche
- c. 1200 (probably 1203) to 13 November 1231: Jean (VI) de Lizaunet
- 1231 to c. 1242: Clément de Coetquen
- c. 1242 to 16. November 1265: Etienne (I)
- 1266 to 13. May 1279: Jean VII. Mahé

=== 1300 to 1500 ===
- 1280 to 30. March 1301 : Thibaud I. de Pouencé
- 1301–1312 : Thibaud II. de Moréac
- 1312–1324 : Jean (VIII) du Bosc
- 1324–1328 : Guillaume (I) Meschin
- 1328–1340 : Jean (IX) d'Avaugour
- 1340– c. 1350 : Henri II. Dubois
- c. 1350– c. 1357 : Simon Le Mayre
- c. 1358– 16. March 1366 : Nicolas
- 1366 or 1367–1373: Jean X. des Pas
- 1373 or 1374 to c. 1377: Geoffroi II. de Coëtmoisan
- c. 1378–1381: Pierre
- 1381–1382: Guy de Roye
- 1382–1386: Évrart de Trémaugon
- 27 August 1386 to 2 February 1390: Guillaume II. de Brie
- 1390 to 20. May 1405: Richard de Lesmenez
- 1405 to 6. December 1429: Etienne II. Cœuvret
- 8. January 1431 to 1437: Jean XI. de Bruc
- 11. December 1437 to 24. August 1444: Alain I. L'Epervier
- 1444 to 16. April 1456: Raoul de La Moussaye
- 17 June 1456 to 22. July 1474: Cardinal Alain II. de Coëtivy
- 1474 to 14. January 1478: Christophe de Penmarch
- 1478 to 29. March 1482: Michel Guibé
- 29. March 1482 to 5. April 1504: Thomas I. James

=== From 1500 ===
- 1504–1521: Mathurin de Plédran

[1522–1524: Thomas Le Roy, Archbishop-elect]
1524–1528: Joannes Staphileus

- 1528–1556: François de Laval
- 1556–1557: Jean de Matthefélon
- 1558–1591: Charles d'Espinay

Sede vacante

1591–1603: Enemond Revol

- 1603–1629: Antoine Revol
- 1630–1644: Hector Douvrier
- 1645–1648: Antoine-Denis Cohon
- 1653–1660: Robert Cupif
- 1660–1692: Matthieu Thoreau
- 1692–1702: Jean-François de Chamillart
- 1702–1715: François Elie de Voyer de Paulmy d'Argenson
- 1715–1748: Jean-Louis du Bouchet de Sourches
- 1749–1767: Jean-François-Louis Dondel
- 1767–1790: Urbain-René de Hercé

== See also ==
- Roman Catholic Archdiocese of Rennes, Dol and Saint-Malo
- Catholic Church in France
- List of Catholic dioceses in France

== Bibliography ==
=== Reference works ===
- Gams, Pius Bonifatius (1873). Series episcoporum Ecclesiae catholicae: quotquot innotuerunt a beato Petro apostolo. Ratisbon: Typis et Sumptibus Georgii Josephi Manz. (Use with caution; obsolete)
- Eubel, Conradus, ed. (1913). Hierarchia catholica (in Latin). Vol. 1 (second ed.). Münster: Libreria Regensbergiana. p. 301.
- Eubel, Conradus, ed. (1914). Hierarchia catholica (in Latin). Vol. 2 (second ed.). Münster: Libreria Regensbergiana. p. 175.
- Eubel, Conradus, ed. (1923). Hierarchia catholica (in Latin). Vol. 3 (second ed.). Münster: Libreria Regensbergiana.
- Gauchat, Patritius (Patrice) (1935). Hierarchia catholica (in Latin). Vol. IV (1592-1667). Münster: Libraria Regensbergiana. p. 219.
- Ritzler, Remigius; Sefrin, Pirminus (1952). Hierarchia catholica medii et recentis aevi (in Latin). Vol. V (1667-1730). Patavii: Messagero di S. Antonio.
- Ritzler, Remigius; Sefrin, Pirminus (1958). Hierarchia catholica medii et recentis aevi (in Latin). Vol. VI (1730-1799). Patavii: Messagero di S. Antonio. pp. 271–272.

=== Studies ===
- Duchesne, Louis Fastes épiscopaux de l'ancienne Gaule: Vol. II: L'Aquitaine et les Lyonnaises. (in French). deuxième edition. Paris: Thorin & fils, 1899. Archived (first edition). (pp. 385–390)
- Duine, François (1914). Le Schisme breton. L'église de Dol au milieu du IXe siècle, d'après les sources. Rennes: Annales de Bretagne.
- Duine, François (1916). La Métropole de Bretagne - Chronique de Dol composée au XIe siècle et catalogues des Dignitaires jusqu'à la Révolution. Paris: Librairie Champion.
- Duine, François (1918). Memento des sources hagiographiques de l'histoire de Bretagne. (in French). Volume 1. Rennes: Bahon-Rault, 1918.
- Duine, François (1923). "Un second manuscrit de la Chronique de Dol. Les archevêques Baudry et Roland. Le catalogue des archevêques," in: Annales de Bretagne Vol. 35 (Rennes: Plihon & Hommay 1921–1923), pp. 92–99.
- Du Tems, Hugues (1774). Le clergé de France, ou tableau historique et chronologique des archevêques, évêques, abbés, abbesses et chefs des chapitres principaux du royaume, depuis la fondation des églises jusqu'à nos jours (in French). Vol. Tome premier. Paris: Delalain.
- Fawtier, R. (1925). "Saint Samson abbé de Dol," in: Annales de Bretagne vol. 35 (Rennes: Plihon & Hommay 1921–1923), pp. 137–186.
- Gautier, Toussaint (1860). Cathédrale de Dol. Histoire de sa fondation, son état ancien et son état actuel. Ouvrage composé d'après des documents inédits. (in French). Dinant: Imp. Bazough 1860.
- Hauréau, Bartholomaeus (1856). Gallia Christiana: in provincias ecclesiasticas distributa. (in Latin). Volume 14 Paris: Didot, 1856. pp. 1038–1084; "instrumenta," pp. 245–260.
- Jean, Armand (1891). Les évêques et les archevêques de France depuis 1682 jusqu'à 1801 (in French). Paris: A. Picard. p. 435.
- Morice, Pierre-Hyacinthe (1742–1746). Mémoires pour servir de preuves à l'Histoire ecclésiastique et civile de Bretagne. (in French and Latin). Paris: imprimerie de Charles Osmont. Volume I (1742); Volume II (1744); Volume 3 (1746).
- Pisani, Paul (1907). Répertoire biographique de l'épiscopat constitutionnel (1791-1802) (in French). Paris: A. Picard et fils.
- Tresvaux, François Marie (1839). L' église de Bretagne ou histoire des siéges épiscopaux, séminaires et collégiales, abbayes et autres communautés de cette province: d'après les matériaux de Dom Hyacinthe Morice de Beaubois. (in French). Paris: Mequignon, 1839. (pp. 253–305)
