= Duchy of Brittany =

Medieval feudal state in northwest France

Duchy of Brittany Dugelezh Breizh (Breton) Duché de Bretagne (French)
- 939–1547
- Top: Ducal and state flag Bottom: The Kroaz Du was the flag used by the independent duchy in the Middle Ages Coat of arms
- Motto: Kentoc'h mervel eget bezañ saotret (Breton); Potius mori quam fœdari (Latin); Plutôt la mort que la souillure (French); À ma vie (French) (variant)
- Status: Independent duchy (939–942); Vassal state of the Kingdom of the West Franks (942–987); Vassal state of the Kingdom of France (987–1491); Client state of the Kingdom of France (1491–1547)
- Capital: Nantes; Rennes; Vannes and other cities
- Common languages: Breton, Gallo, Latin, French, Poitevin
- Government: Feudal monarchy
- Duke
  - 939–952: Allan II (first)
  - 1514–1524: Claude (last)
- Legislature: Estates of Brittany; Parlement of Rennes
- History
  - Battle of Trans-la-Fôret: 1 August 939
  - Union with France: 13 August 1547
- Currency: Various
Preceded by	Succeeded by
Brittany; Viking Brittany	Kingdom of France

The Duchy of Brittany (Breton: Dugelezh Breizh [dyˈɡɛːlɛs ˈbrɛjs]; French: Duché de Bretagne) was a medieval feudal state that existed between approximately 939 (Note: This was the date of the Battle of Trans-la-Forêt) and 1547. (Note: The year the titles of King of France and Duke of Brittany were joined in one ruler, Henry II of France) Its territory covered the northwestern peninsula of France, bordered by the Bay of Biscay to the west, and the English Channel to the north. It was also less definitively bordered by the river Loire to the south, and Normandy, and other French provinces, to the east. The duchy was established after the expulsion of Viking armies from the region around 939. In the 10th and 11th centuries, it was politically unstable, with the dukes holding only limited power outside their own personal lands. The Duchy of Brittany had mixed relationships with the neighbouring Duchy of Normandy, sometimes allying itself with Normandy, and at other times, such as the Breton–Norman War, entering into open conflict.

Henry II of England invaded Brittany in the mid-12th century and became Count of Nantes in 1158 under a treaty with Duke Conan IV. Henry's son, Geoffrey, became Duke through his marriage to Constance, the hereditary Duchess. The Angevins remained in control until the collapse of their empire in northern France in 1204. The French Crown maintained its influence over the duchy for the rest of the 13th century. Monastic orders supported by the Breton aristocracy spread across the duchy in the 11th and 12th centuries, and in the 13th, the first of the mendicant orders established themselves in Brittany's major towns. A civil war broke out in the 14th century, as rival claimants for the duchy vied for power during the Breton War of Succession, with different factions supported by England and France.

The independent sovereign nature of the duchy began to come to an end upon the death of its duke, Francis II, in 1488. The Duchy was inherited by his daughter, Anne, but King Charles VIII of France had her existing marriage annulled and then married her himself. As a result, the King of France acquired the title of Duke of Brittany – jure uxoris. The Ducal crown became united with the French crown in 1532 through a vote of the Estates of Brittany, after the death of Queen Claude of France, the last sovereign duchess. Her sons Francis III, Duke of Brittany and then Henry II of France would in any case have created a personal union on the death of their father.

Following the French Revolution, and as a result of the various republican forms of French government since 1792, the duchy was replaced by the French system of départements (or departments) which continues under the Fifth Republic of France. In modern times the departments have also joined into administrative regions (Note: The creation of regions in modern France occurred pursuant to the Law of Decentralisation (2 March 1982)) although the administrative region of Brittany does not encompass the entirety of the medieval duchy. The movement for the reunification of Brittany calls for the restoration of the territorial integrity of the historic Duchy of Brittany as a region of the French Republic.

== Background ==
=== Origins ===
Brittany in the 9th century

The Duchy of Brittany that emerged in the early 10th century was influenced by several earlier polities. Prior to the expansion of the Roman Empire into the region, Gallic tribes had occupied the Armorican peninsula, dividing it into five regions that then formed the basis for the Roman administration of the area, and which survived into the period of the Duchy. These Gallic tribes – termed the Armorici in Latin – had close relationships with the Britonnes tribes in Roman Britain. Between the late 4th and the early 7th centuries, many of these Britonnes migrated to the Armorican peninsula, blending with the local people to form the later Britons, who eventually became the Bretons. The reasons for these migrations remain uncertain. (Note: Mid-20th-century historians Ferdinand Lot and Nora Kershaw Chadwick argued that this had occurred in response to hostile raids into Britain. But late 20th-century historians, including Patrick Galliou and Michael Jones, have emphasised the paucity of evidence supporting this analysis.) These migrations from Britain contributed to Brittany's name.

Brittany fragmented into small, warring regna, kingdoms, each competing for resources. The Frankish Carolingian Empire conquered the region during the 8th century, starting around 748 taking the whole of Brittany by 799. The Carolingians tried to create a unitary administration around the centres of Rennes, Nantes, and Vannes using the local rulers, but the kings of Brittany's hold on the region remained tenuous. Carolingian technology and culture began to influence Brittany, and the church in Brittany also began to emulate the Frankish model.

The greatest influence on the later Duchy, however, was the formation of a unitary Brittany kingdom in the 9th century. In 831 Louis the Pious appointed Nominoe, the Count of Vannes, ruler of the Bretons, imperial missus, at Ingelheim in 831. After the death of Louis in 840, Nominoe rose to challenge the new emperor, Charles the Bald, emboldened in part by new Viking raids on the empire. Charles the Bald created the Marches of Neustria to defend Western Francia from the Bretons and the Vikings. Erispoe fought Charles the Bald, who felt that a quick attack would successfully challenge the new Breton leader. Erispoe won a victory at the Battle of Jengland and, under their Treaty of Angers in 851, Brittany's independence was secured.

The new kingdom proved fragile and collapsed under Viking attack. In 853 the Viking Godfried left the Seine with his fleet, sailed around the Breton peninsula and sacked Nantes. Erispoe entered into an alliance with the leader of another Viking fleet, Sidroc, who betrayed him, resulting in Erispoe's defeat at the hands of the Vikings. A weakened Erispoe ruled until 857 when he was assassinated and then followed as Breton ruler by his cousin and rival, Salomon, the Count of Rennes and Nantes. Viking raids continued. Alan I successfully defeated one wave of Vikings around 900, expanding the kingdom to include not only the Breton territories of Léon, Domnonée, Cornouaille, and the Vannetais, but also the Frankish counties of Rennes, Nantes, Coutances, and Avranches, as well as the western parts of Poitou and Anjou. Alan I's military success resulted in a period of peace from Viking invasions and few raids from the Vikings were recorded from 900 through to 907.

After Alan I's death in 907, Brittany was overrun once again by Vikings. Fulk the Red, Count of Anjou, is said to have occupied Nantes from 907 to 919 when he abandoned it to the invading Vikings. In 919, the great Viking fleet of Rognvaldr landed in Nantes, quickly coming to dominate the region. This invasion accelerated the exodus of Bretons, including that of the machtierns, "the local hereditary officers upon whom the civil administration depended". Among the refugees were Mathedoi, the Count of Poher, and his son Alan Barbetorte, the grandson of Alan I; they fled to England and lived in exile in the courts of Edward the Elder and Edward's son and successor Æthelstan. The Viking occupation of Brittany lasted until about 936. Little recorded history of this period is available until Alan Barbetorte returned in 937 to expel the Vikings and reestablish a version of the former Carolingian kingdom.

== History ==
=== 10th century ===
The Duchy of Brittany emerged after Alan Barbetorte's return to the region from England in 936. Barbetorte claimed the titles of the Count of Cornouaille and Nantes and, as Alan II, reigned as the new Brittonum dux. Using a network of small, defended towns and monastic sites, Alan pushed back the Viking advances. On 1 August 939, with the aid of Judicael Berengar, Count of Rennes, and Hugh I, Count of Maine, he defeated the Vikings in the Battle of Trans-la-Forêt, completing their expulsion from Brittany. Alan's duchy was smaller than the previous Kingdom of Brittany, as, despite gaining Magues and Tiffauges in the south, the dukes no longer ruled over the regions of Cotentin, Avranchin, and Mayenne. Alan paid homage to Louis IV of France for Brittany in 942. Despite some older Celtic influences, the new duchy was in many ways similar to the other, post-Carolingian states forming across the region. Over the coming decades, a network of powerful local lords emerged across Brittany, occupying motte and bailey castles and owing a loose feudal loyalty to the duke. The east of Brittany was the first to change, but the practices spread over the next fifty years to the more remote regions of the north- and south-west.

Alan II was also allied to Theobald I of Blois, the count of Chartres. Alan II had married Theobald's sister, Adelaide, giving Theobald influence all the way to Rennes. However Alan II's death left a void in Brittany leaving it vulnerable to encroachment by either the Normans or the Angevins. In turn the recently widowed Fulk II, Count of Anjou, Theobald's ally, married Alan II's widow. (Note: Brittany was free of any royal French influence until 1123, when Louis VI of France confirmed the bishop of Nantes. See Jones, 1988, page 4.) Upon his death, Alan II was succeeded by his son Drogo. Drogo's rule set the precedent for the role of a regent during the minority of a ducal heir. Throughout his reign, Drogo was under the shared regency of his uncle the Count of Blois, Theobald I (who entrusted the administration of the duchy to Wicohen, Archbishop of Dol, and the Count of Rennes Juhel Berengar as administrators), and his stepfather, the Fulk II, Count of Anjou.

Under Drogo, the duchy continued to experience political instability and he was unable to sustain his line. Drogo died in 958. Two of Alan II's illegitimate sons, Hoël and Guerich, attempted to act as Counts of Nantes and preserve their claim to duchy but were eventually unsuccessful. In 990 Juhel Berengar's son Conan I, the grandson of Pascweten, became Duke and the title passed to the House of Rennes. Conan I ruled for only two years and died fighting against his brother-in-law Fulk III, Count of Anjou at the Battle of Conquereuil on 27 June 992. He was succeeded by his oldest son Geoffrey I. Blois threatened Conan's succession. Duke Geoffrey I, a member of the House of Nantes, entered into a dynastic alliance with Richard II, Duke of Normandy in a diplomatic double marriage between the two houses. The church-sanctioned marriage ceremonies were held at Mont Saint-Michel. Geoffrey I married Hawise of Normandy, Richard II's sister; and Richard II married Judith of Brittany, Geoffrey I's sister and Conan I's daughter.

=== 11th century ===
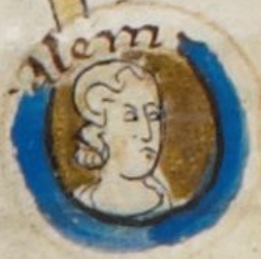
Duke Alan III

The 11th century was marked by a failed alliance with Normandy. William the Conqueror challenged the Breton dukes, and they formed an alliance with the French king. The death of Geoffrey I, in 1008, allowed Richard II to intervene directly in Brittany during the minority of his nephew, Alan III, against rebellious counts who attempted to take advantage of the youthful duke. The guardianship would be reciprocated later when Alan III was named as one of the primary guardians of William of Normandy. By designating Alan III as a guardian of William, Robert I was "involving a close family member who would not compete with his heir". In his guardianship of Duke William, Alan III was allied with Count Gilbert and Robert II, Archbishop of Rouen, William's uncles. However, when Archbishop Robert died in 1037 instability surfaced. Alan III countered the instability by reinforcing the power of the Norman ducal house providing Robert I's two youngest brothers with land and title. However, by October 1, 1040, Alan III was killed by poison while besieging a rebel castle in Vimoutiers. Tension increased in Normandy following his death, with Count Gilbert dying shortly thereafter. A rival faction in the guardianship of Normandy emerged, one that would intervene in Brittany, suppressing Alan III's heir, Conan II, from claiming his inheritance.

At around eight years of age, Conan II succeeded his father Alan III as Duke of Brittany, with the ducal regency entrusted to Alan's brother Odo, Count of Penthièvre. However, by the time Conan II reached his majority at age sixteen, around 1048, Odo refused to relinquish power. During the dynastic conflict between uncle and nephew, Hoel of Cornouaille supported Odo in suppressing Conan's inheritance. Odo was Hoèl's brother-in-law as he was married to Hoel's sister Agnes of Cornouaille. By 1057, Conan II captured and imprisoned Odo. He came to terms with Hoèl of Cornouaille later that year. Conan II faced numerous threats posed by the pro-Norman faction in Brittany, including revolts sponsored by William, Duke of Normandy for whom Conan's father had served as Guardian. William supported challengers to Conan's authority, encouraging them to rebel against the Breton duke, his cousin. William continued courting the family of Odo, who was imprisoned. In response, Conan promoted his own legitimate claim as Duke of Normandy over William, as the Catholic Church began preferring legitimate heirs born in church-sanctioned marriage over out-of-wedlock issue. This rivalry led to war between Normandy and Brittany.

The 1064–1065 war between Brittany and Normandy (the Breton-Norman War) was sparked after Duke William supported the rebellion against Conan II led by Rivallon I of Dol. In 1065, before his invasion of Anglo-Saxon England, William of Normandy warned his rivals in Brittany and Anjou to abstain from any attacks on his duchy, on the grounds that his mission bore the papal banner. However, Conan II rebuffed the warning and declared that he would press any advantage against William. While William plotted to take the English crown, Conan consolidated his authority in Brittany and planned to take advantage of William's absence to invade Normandy. First, however, he needed to neutralize Anjou, another historic rival. Once Anjou was pacified he planned to advance into Maine and then into Normandy. However, during his 1066 siege of Angers, Conan was found dead after wearing poisoned riding gloves. Duke William was widely suspected of organising the assassination.

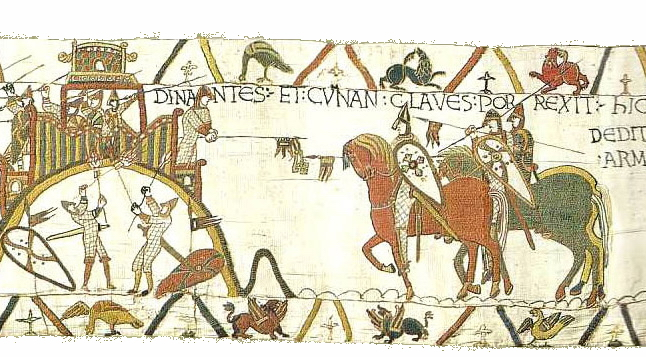
The attack on Dinan (cf. DINANTES), from the Bayeux Tapestry

William the Conqueror successfully invaded England in 1066 with an army that included some Bretons. William was able to attract Bretons into his expeditionary army for the upcoming campaign to claim the English crown., perhaps in part because the Breton commanders in Duke William's army were the second-sons of Breton lords, such as Alain Le Roux (son of Eudas of Penthièvre). The Bretons within the Conquest army represented at least three major groupings, two of which would become relevant to the long-term future of the duchy. One group was represented by Ralph de Gael, briefly the Earl of Suffolk. In 1075 he was among the leaders of a "Breton revolt". Ralph escaped returning to Brittany where he also revolted against the Breton Duke before eventually reconciling with the duchy. To the south and west of England, William granted lands to groups of Breton nobles who were more fractious than united, whether in Brittany or in England. This group had no one singular leader who could serve a unifying role . Their numbers included Herve of Leon, the viscount of Leon, who was briefly the Earl of Wiltshire. The third group were those nobles associated with the Richmond-Penthièvre family. Odo of Penthièvre was a principal antagonist of Conan II. Under William I, three of Odo of Penthièvre's sons (Alan, Stephen and Brien) were granted substantial lands in England, including the Honour of Richmond, lands in Suffolk, and the Earldoms of Richmond and Cornwall.

Also in 1066, Hawise succeeded her brother Conan II as hereditary Duchess of Brittany. She married Hoël of Cornouaille. Hoel ruled as Hoel II, Duke of Brittany and started the House of Kernev which continued to rule Brittany until 1156 (see below). Hoël inherited a divided Brittany which was split into six largely independent regions: Rennes, Panthièvre, Léon, Cornouaille, the Broërec, and Nantes. Ducal power was non-existent in Panthièvre and Léon, and even in the rest of Brittany the duke's powers did not extend beyond his own personal lands. The barons in Brittany did not feel that they were in any way vassals of the duke, owing him service in exchange for their lands, and only attended the ducal courts when they felt it was in their own interests to do so.

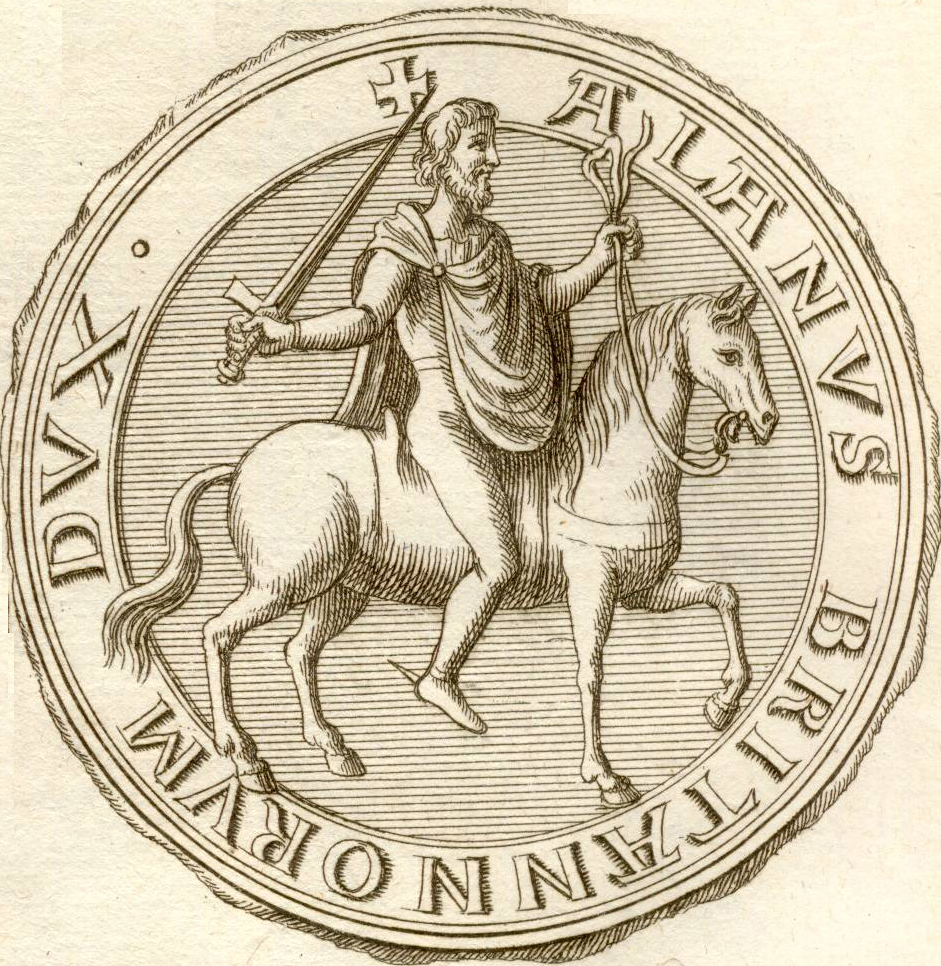
Seal of Alan IV, Duke of Brittany

However, the historic rivalry between Brittany and Normandy resurfaced at the close of the 11th century. By 1075, Hoèl returned to the traditional Breton policy of opposing Norman expansion with an alliance with the young king Philip I of France. Ralph de Gael, in exile in Brittany after the unsuccessful 1075 rebellion in England, led incursions into Normandy from his base in Dol. In 1076, King William of England retaliated by leading an army into Brittany to eject Ralph, but was met with a rare defeat by an allied army of Bretons and French forces. In the peace negotiations which followed William offered his second daughter Constance in marriage to the Breton heir Alan IV, though nothing came of the betrothal at the time.

By 1086, Alan IV was forced to abandon his duchy after an invasion launched by William I of England. However, a peace settlement was reached that same year and in the negotiations that followed Alan IV was forced into marriage with King William I's second daughter Constance of England. The marriage ceremonies may have taken place in Bayeux in Normandy. William of Malmesbury wrote that Constance was unpopular at the Breton court because of her 'severe and conservative' manner. William of Malmesbury also alleged that Alan IV had Constance poisoned to death, but this was unverified However, Orderic Vitalis wrote that as duchess, Constance did all she could to further the welfare of the Bretons, who grieved deeply at her death in 1090.

In 1092, Alan IV donated property to Redon Abbey by charter, and by 1093, married his second wife, Ermengarde of Anjou as part of a political alliance with Fulk IV, Count of Anjou to counter Anglo-Norman influence. With Ermengarde, he had a son, Geoffrey, who died young, Conan III, and a daughter Hawise. Hawise was married to count Baldwin VII of Flanders. In 1098, Alan IV joined the First Crusade, leaving Brittany under the regency of his wife Ermengarde of Anjou until his return early in the 12th century. Ermengarde ruled from Nantes rather than Rennes, as it was closer to her home county of Anjou.

=== 12th century ===
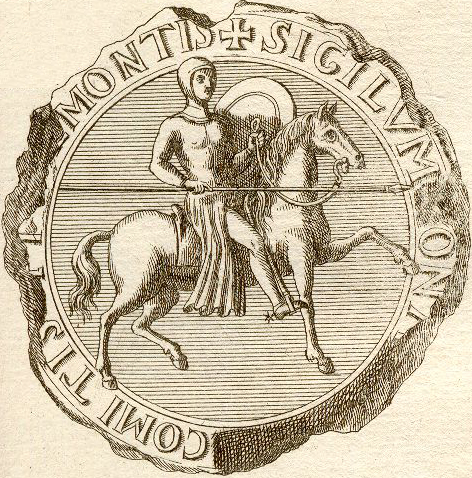
Seal of Conan IV, Duke of Brittany

Alan IV returned from Crusade in 1101. In 1112, Alan IV's son Conan III inherited Brittany on the abdication of his father, who retired to the monastery of Redon. By 1113, Conan III married Maude, an illegitimate daughter of King Henry I of England. With Maude he had three children, Hoel, Bertha, and Constance. During his reign he strengthened the rule of the duchy.

During the dynastic struggle between Stephen of England (Stephen of Blois) and the dispossessed Empress Matilda, Conan III allied himself with King Stephen. Empress Matilda's unpopular marriage with Geoffrey V of Anjou was forced upon her by her father Henry I. It reflected the historic rivalry between Brittany, Normandy, and Anjou.

Conan III sought to counter Angevin influence and preserve Breton independence. In his alliance with Stephen, Conan III looked for greater influence with Stephen, who needed allies on the continent to out-flank Matilda. Matilda was able to consolidate power in Normandy and Anjou. Brittany's position to the west of the Angevin controlled territory exposed a wide frontier for Stephen to exploit against Matilda.

In 1138, Conan III's daughter, Bertha, was married to Alan of Penthièvre, a supporter of King Stephen. For his support, Stephan created Conan's son-in-law Alan as 1st Earl of Richmond in the second creation, a title previously held by Alan's uncle Alain Le Roux. Later, when Alan died in 1146, Bertha returned home to Brittany from England. On his death-bed in 1148, Conan III disinherited his son Hoel, Count of Nantes from succession to the duchy. With this surprise move, Bertha became his heiress and successor as hereditary Duchess of Brittany. However, Hoel was to retain the county of Nantes.

Duchess Bertha, as dowager countess of Richmond, continued Brittany's alliance with Stephen's England against the Angevins. However this strategy became untenable after 1153, when Stephen's son Eustace died suddenly. Eustace's death provided an opportunity for Matilda's son, Henry FitzEmpress, to land an invasion army in England and press for his mother's claims. In the Treaty of Wallingford, Stephen was forced to recognize Henry FitzEmpress as his heir, with Matilda abdicating her claim in her son's favour. The treaty exposed Brittany to retaliatory incursions from Henry FitzEmpress and his brother Geoffery FitzEmpress.

On the death of Bertha in early 1156, her son, Conan IV, expected to inherit the ducal throne. However, he was denied his inheritance by his stepfather Odo, Viscount of Porhoët (also known as Odo II), Bertha's second husband; Odo II refused to relinquish his authority over Brittany. To consolidate his hold on power, Odo II entered into a pact with the disinherited Hoel, Count of Nantes, to divide Brittany between them. But at the same time, Hoel was under threat of rebellion in Nantes, sponsored by Geoffrey Fitzempress, and he could not send any aid to Eudas. Conan IV landed in Brittany and took Rennes, while his ally Raoul de Fougères captured and imprisoned Eudas. Conan IV was formally enthroned as Duke of Brittany in Rennes. While Conan IV was consolidating his inheritance in 1156, Geoffrey FitzEmpress successfully took Nantes from Hoel.

Upon Geoffrey's death in 1158, Conan IV seized Nantes, reuniting the Duchy once again. However, Henry II, now King of England, seized the Earldom of Richmond, Conan's paternal inheritance. Henry demanded the return of Nantes, and when he obtained control of it from Conan IV, became the Count of Nantes, without obligation to the Duke of Brittany (later dukes would eventually reunite Nantes to Brittany).

Henry II of England continued to stoke revolts and rebellions in Brittany against Conan IV. In response, Conan IV took the Breton counties of Tréguier and Guingamp from his uncle Count Henri, a supporter of Henry II of England. Richmond was returned to Conan IV later that year in an agreement reached with Henry II of England. By 1160 Conan was forced to yield to Henry. In the peace negotiations which followed, Conan was obliged to marry Henry's cousin, Margaret of Scotland, in 1160.

Later, Conan IV was faced with additional revolts from barons, possibly sponsored by Henry II. Conan appealed to Henry II for aid to end the revolts. For his aid Henry II insisted on the betrothal of Conan's only daughter and heiress Constance to Henry's son Geoffrey Plantagenet, continuing the policy of interweaving the Breton succession with the Plantagenet's succession.

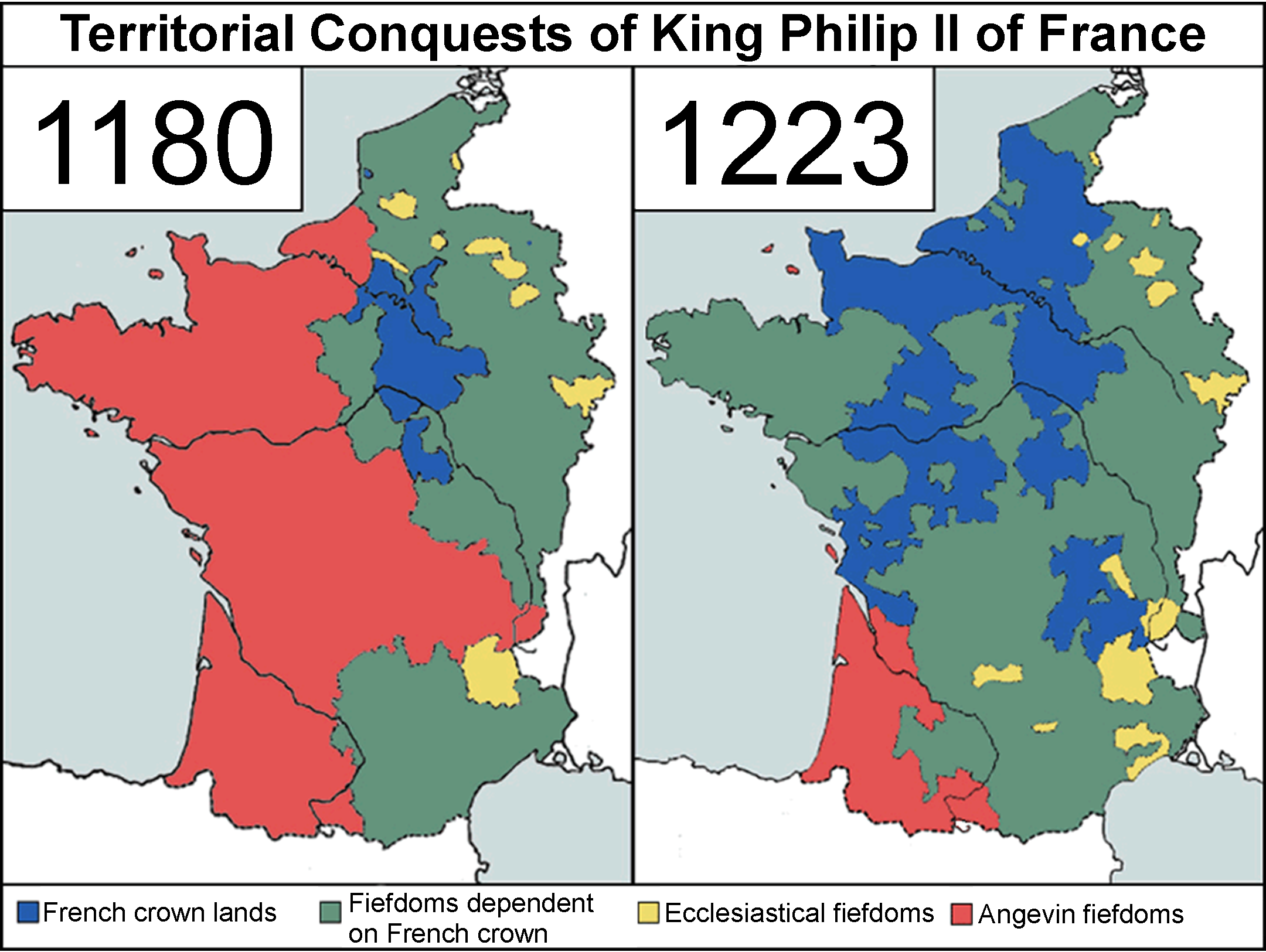
France's influence grows under Philip II

Upon her father's abdication in 1166, Constance became duchess, although Henry II held the Duchy until Constance married Geoffrey. Geoffrey and Constance ruled jointly until 1186, when Geoffrey was stamped to death in a riding accident during a tournament in Paris. Constance thereafter ruled the Duchy on her own. Henry II of England next arranged for Constance to marry Ranulph de Blondeville, 6th Earl of Chester on 3 February 1188 or 1189. Henry II died in 1189 and was succeeded by Richard I as King of England. Lacking a male heir, King Richard I of England officially proclaimed his nephew, Constance's son, Arthur I of Brittany, as his heir presumptive in a treaty signed with Philip Augustus and Tancred of Sicily.

To promote her son's position and inheritance, Constance, Duchess of Brittany included Arthur in the government of Brittany in 1196. The same year, Constance's marriage with Ranulph deteriorated, with Ranulph imprisoning Constance. Her imprisonment sparked rebellion across Brittany on her behalf. Ranulph bowed to growing pressure and had the Duchess released in 1198. Once back in Brittany, Constance had her marriage to Ranulph annulled in 1199 (there was no issue from this marriage). Later that year, Constance took Guy of Thouars as her 'second' husband at Angers. Throughout these years, Constance advised her son Arthur towards a French alliance, pursuing the policy of her late husband Geoffrey II, despite his designation as Richard I's heir. In Constance bore Guy of Thouars two or three daughters. (Note: The existence of Constance and Guy's third daughter is still disputed.) The first born, Alix of Thouars, was followed by Catherine of Thouars (1201-c. 1240) and maybe Margaret of Thouars (1201-c. 1216/1220). Constance died due to complications during the delivery.

=== 13th century ===
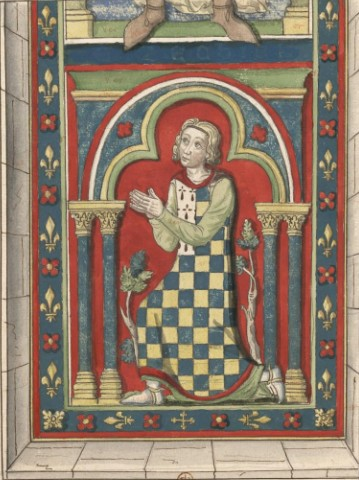
Pierre Mauclerc: Duke of Brittany jure uxoris with Alix, and Regent to his son John I

In the 13th century England's alliance with Brittany collapsed under King John of England. When Richard I died in 1199, Philip agreed to recognize Arthur of Brittany as count of Anjou, Maine, and Poitou, in exchange for Arthur swearing fealty to him, and thereby becoming a direct vassal of France. However, in 1202, 15-year-old Arthur was captured by the English while besieging Mirebeau. By 1203, the imprisoned Arthur was transferred to Rouen, under the charge of William de Braose, the court favorite of King John. Arthur vanished mysteriously in April 1203. Arthur's legal successor was Eleanor of Brittany, who was however imprisoned by John at Corfe Castle in Dorset; the request of Philip II for her release was neglected.

Recognizing that John of England could have Eleanor married to a vassal loyal to England, who would rule Brittany through her, Philip II formally recognized Constance's infant daughter Alix as hereditary Duchess of Brittany. Initially Alix's father Guy of Thouars acted as regent. Philip II of France was maneuvering to keep Brittany within his sphere of influence. The marriage of the infant Alix to Capetian cadet Pierre Mauclerc in 1213, began the new House of Dreux. After Guy of Thouars' regency, Alix ruled as nominal duchess with her husband Pierre as Duke jure uxoris. In 1214, King John sent an expedition into France, in part to establish Eleanor as his puppet duchess, but after his defeat also recognized Alix and Peter as rulers of the Duchy. Eleanor was kept captive in England until her death in 1241, ending the line of Geoffrey II.

In 1235, the stage was set for the next century's Breton War of Succession when Peter I dispossessed the heir of the Penthièvre Dynasty in order to give the countship of Penthièvre to his second child, Yolande.

Beginning in the 13th century, the Duchy of Brittany experienced nearly a century of peace. Peter I continued as Regent for a time for his son John I. When John I reached his majority, Peter I ceded him the Ducal crown and left Brittany on Crusade. John I married Blanche of Navarre. Upon the death of his sister Yolande of Brittany, John I seized the countship of Penthièvre for himself. John I in turn was succeeded by his son John II. John II married Beatrice of England and ruled until 1305.

=== 14th century ===
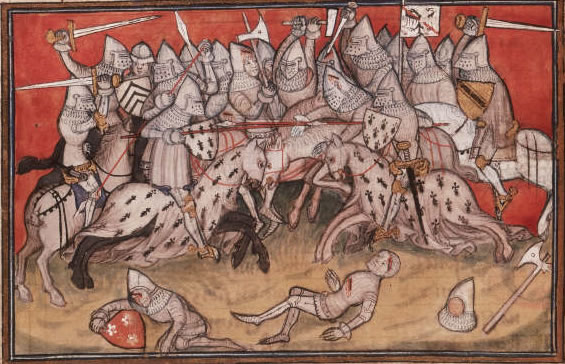
The Battle of Auray in 1364 resulting in victory for the House of Montfort in the Breton War of Succession

In the 14th century, the Breton War of Succession ensued; the title of Duke passed to the House of Montfort. John II died in 1305 and was succeeded by this son, Arthur II as Duke. Arthur II ruled independently of the French crown. His reign included several administrative innovations including the creation of several "battles" or districts meant to provide a stronger defense, and the creation of the Estates of Brittany, marking a critical step towards a parliamentary form of government. Arthur II's reign is also distinguished by his two marriages, the first to Mary of Limoges and the second to Yolande of Dreux, Queen of Scotland.

Arthur II's son by Mary of Limoges, John III became Duke but failed to produce a living heir, despite three marriages. John III's succession efforts were focused on his attempts to deny his half brother, John of Montfort from inheriting the Ducal Crown. He attempted to name the King of France as heir in an act that defied all precedents to maintain Brittany as an independent sovereign state. The Breton nobles predictably rejected the attempt and Brittany's independence continued. John III died in 1341 without a succession plan.

John III's half-brother, John of Montfort, claimed the title of Duke, but his claim was rejected by the King of France who favored the competing claims of Joan of Penthièvre (Note: Joan of Penthièvre was John of Montfort's half-niece by his half brother, Guy. John III, Guy and John of Montfort were all sons of Arthur II.) and her husband Charles of Blois, who also claimed the Ducal title. The Breton War of Succession between the claimants ensued when John of Montfort refused to cede his rights in their favor. The Breton War of Succession was fought from 1341 to 1364 between these two Breton houses, the House of Blois Châtillon and the House of Montfort.

Charles of Blois Châtillon claimed the title Duke of Brittany from 1341 to his death.

During the war, John of Montfort was imprisoned in Paris. Hostilities abated for a short time, and he was freed under the Treaty of Malestroit in 1341. He died in 1345, leaving his son John as the Montfort claimant to the ducal title. John's widowed Duchess Consort, Joanna of Flanders, acted as regent for her son John and continued the war in his name. The House of Montfort emerged victorious with substantial help from English allies (Note: At the beginning of the conflict when John de Montfort was nearly routed by Charles of Blois, John's wife Joanna of Flanders was able to successfully defend Brest and turn the tide of the war with the assistance of the English naval forces led by Walter de Manny, 1st Baron Manny. When Jean de Montfort's son launched his attack on the forces of Charles de Blois, his British allies were led by John Chandos. Years after the Breton Civil War, John IV returned from exile in England a second time with British allies led by Thomas Woodstock.) Under the terms of their surrender, Joan was allowed to keep Penthièvre and retained the title Duchess of Brittany for life. Under the Treaties of Guerande, semi-Salic succession was agreed under which, if the reigning member of the House of Montfort died without legitimate male issue, the eldest direct legitimate male descendant of Joan would inherit the Ducal crown of Brittany. John IV, Duke of Brittany ruled with difficulty after the Breton civil war, and was forced into exile in England for a second time in 1373 where he lived in the court of Edward III.

The House of Montfort's victory strengthened the position of England in Brittany. One of the effects of the Breton War of Succession was to intensify the rivalries between England and France with Brittany as the contested prize. The Houses of Penthièvre and Montfort were united in the sense of their opposition to the attempted annexation of Brittany by Charles V of France as a consequence of this Breton civil war. The French king sent the Constable of France, Bertrand de Guesclin, into Brittany with the goal of uniting it to the French crown. When the Breton nobles rebelled against this proposed unification, John IV was able to return from England, assisted once again by a strong army including his English ally, and was able to re-establish his rule. (Note: John IV relied on two English military leaders to execute his two military campaigns to regain the Duchy, John Chandos and Thomas Woodstock.) The deposed Joan of Penthièvre joined in the efforts to return John IV to Brittany to defend the Duchy against the advances of Charles V. John IV had three wives but only his third wife, Joan of Navarre, Queen of England, bore him children. John IV died on 1 November 1399. Joan remained a widow for four years acting as a regent for her son John V. (Note: According to the Encyclopædia Britannica, affection developed between Joanna and Henry Bolingbroke (the future King Henry IV) while he resided at the Breton court during his banishment from England. In 1403, Joan became the second wife of Henry IV of England.) The House of Montfort's difficulties in maintaining the Ducal crown continued when John V, Duke of Brittany succeeded his father. By 1417, the Duke of Brittany were styled "rulers by the Grace of God".

=== 15th century ===
Hundred Years' War evolution. French English Burgundian England and France competed for influence over the Duchy of Brittany during the war.

The intrigues and contests between the House of Montfort and the House of Penthièvre continued well after the Breton War of Succession. John IV's successor, John V, Duke of Brittany, was kidnapped by the grandson of Joan of Penthièvre. He was freed through the efforts of his wife the Duchess of Brittany, Joan of France and the remaining wealth of the Penthièvre family was confiscated. John V was succeeded first by his son Francis I. Since Francis I had no male heir, he was followed by a younger son of John V, Peter II. When Peter II died without issue, the Ducal Crown passed to his uncle Arthur III. He was, in turn, succeeded by his nephew Francis II.

The reign of Francis II was notable in many respects including two wars against Charles VIII of France, both of which were lost, the establishment of the Parlement of Rennes, and the death of all of his children save for his daughter Anne of Brittany. Francis II's rule as Duke was also marked by continued intrigues with the House of Penthièvre. Joan of Penthièvre's later descendants, the Brosse line of the House of Penthièvre through Jean de Brosse, were denied their claims to the Ducal Crown in the 15th century, possibly as an alteration of the rules of inheritance by the then Duke of Brittany Francis II. The wars with France eventually cost Ducal Brittany its independence, while the Parlement ensured a degree of autonomy that would continue through the reign of Louis XIV. That Francis II's sole heir was his daughter Anne assured an inheritance contest on his death that would pit the power of the House of Montfort against conflicting treaty obligations to the House of Penthièvre in Brittany, and the House of Valois in France, and would also be a test of the Breton tradition of semi-Salic law in which a daughter could be the principal inheritor. The position of the King of France dominated these events through two wars. After the first war, under the Treaty of Verger, the marriage of Francis II's sole surviving issue, Anne, would need to be approved by the King of France.

Francis II worked to seek a husband for Anne who would be strong enough to defend Brittany from further influence from the French Crown. Duchesse Anne of Brittany was initially betrothed to Edward, Prince of Wales, the son of Edward IV, but upon the king's death his son disappeared and the English throne passed to Richard III of England. Anne was then married to Maximillian I of Austria.

However, relations between Brittany and France deteriorated and Francis II was forced into the last Franco-Breton war, which he lost. At the end of the second war between Francis II and Charles VIII of France, the so-called Mad War, Anne of Brittany's first marriage to Maximillian was declared illegal on the basis that the French King had not approved it under the terms of the Treaty of Verger. Anne was married to Charles VIII of France in a ceremony that was validated by Pope Innocent VIII. Once they were married, Charles did not allow Anne to use the title Duchess of Brittany. However, upon his death, Anne returned to Brittany and took steps to return the Duchy to independent rule under herself as Duchess. The children of Charles and Anne did not reach adulthood and this presented a new Breton succession problem as well as one for France. Both succession issues were solved upon Anne's marriage to Louis XII but at the cost of restoring and furthering the independence of Brittany.

In 1499, the birth of Anne of Brittany's sole heir with Louis XII of France, her daughter Claude of France, introduced a new succession issue in Brittany and France. In Brittany, with the provisions of the Treaty of Guerande set aside by the Estates of Brittany, Claude could claim to be Duchess of Brittany in her own right, as several Duchesses by right of inheritance had done over the centuries. France, however operated under strict Salic law, requiring a male heir. The French requirement was solved upon Claude's marriage to Francis I of France. The birth of Claude's sons Francis (who became Francis III, Duke of Brittany, as well as the Dauphin of France) and Henry II of France represented a resolution to these contrasting succession issues but accelerated the loss of Brittany's independence and the eventual disappearance of the Ducal title as an independent sovereign Ducal crown.

=== 16th century ===
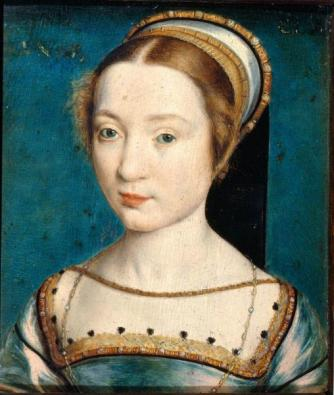
Claude, Duchess of Brittany

Anne of Brittany's second marriage making her Queen Consort of France continued into the 16th century; and she died in 1514. Queen Claude of France, reigned as duchess of Brittany from 1514, but under her husband king Francis was not able to maintain an independent government in the Duchy of Brittany. Claude's son Francis I was invested as duke of Brittany. But this act meant next to nothing to advance Breton independence. Some members of the House of Penthièvre were appointed as royal governors of Brittany by the French. Their failure to reassert their Ducal rights successfully hastened the merger of the Ducal crown into the Kingdom of France. At this time the title Duke of Brittany began to lose independent sovereign status and began to become only titular in character; the Breton region lost independence and became a province of France.

During the Middle Ages, the Kings of France considered that the Duchy of Brittany was feudally a part of their Kingdom of France (i.e. it was within the traditional borders of the realm, and the King of France was deemed to be overlord of the Duchy). In practice, however, the Duchy of Brittany was a largely independent sovereign state.

The independent sovereign nature of the Duchy began to come to an end upon the death of Francis II, Duke of Brittany. The Duchy was inherited by his daughter, Anne, but King Charles VIII of France, determined to bring the territory under royal control, had her marriage annulled and then forced her to marry him in a series of actions that were acknowledged by the Pope. As a result, the Kingdom of France and the Duchy of Brittany were placed in the personal union of their marriage, and the King of France also held the title of Duke of Brittany jure uxoris. During their marriage, Charles VIII prohibited Anne of Brittany from using the title Duchess of Brittany, and imposed a Royal Governor from the House of Penthièvre on the Duchy.

Legally, however, the Duchy remained separate from France proper; the two titles were linked only by the marriage of the King and Queen and, in 1498 when Charles VIII died childless, the title Duke of Brittany remained with Anne, rather than passing to the heir of France, Louis XII. Anne of Brittany returned to Brittany and began to re-establish an independent sovereign rule. However, the new French king, Louis XII married Anne himself, and so the King of France was once more Duke of Brittany jure uxoris. Legally, Brittany still remained distinct, and its future remained dependent on the Ducal bloodline, now held by the House of Montfort. When Anne died, Brittany passed to her daughter and heiress, Claude, rather than remaining with the King of France, her father.

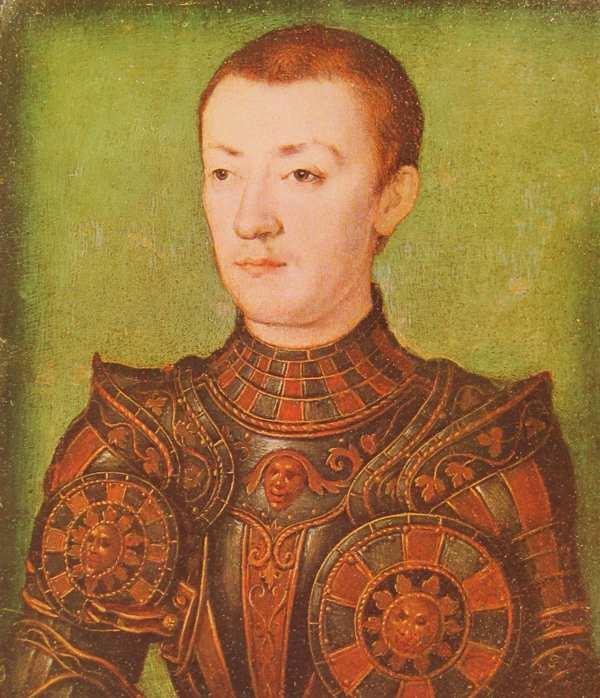
Francis III, Duke of Brittany

Claude married the future King of France, Francis I. By this marriage, and through the succession to the French crown, the King of France became Duke of Brittany jure uxoris once more. Claude's death in 1524 separated the Duchy from the crown again, and (it would transpire) for the final time. Because Claude, like her mother, was sovereign Duchess, the title of 'Duke' did not remain with her husband, but instead passed to her son, Francis III of Brittany, who was also Dauphin of France. Legally, the Crown and Duchy were again separate, but the Duke was a child, and the Duchy had been governed as an integral part of France for years; the King had little trouble in maintaining royal control over the Duchy. Breton independence was effectively ended when in 1532 the Estates of Brittany proclaimed the perpetual union of Brittany with the French crown. Legally, the Duchy was part of France.

Francis III remained Duke of Brittany, but died without attaining the French crown in 1536. He was succeeded by his brother Henry, who was the first person to become both King of France and Duke of Brittany in his own right. Any trace of Breton independence ended with the ascension of Henry, as Henry II of France, to the French throne. The French Crown and Breton Duchy were now united by inheritance, and the merging of Brittany into France was thus completed. Henry II was not crowned separately as Duke of Brittany. However Henry attempted to create a separate legal status for Brittany vis-a-vis the Kingdom of France similar to the position of the Duchy of Cornwall to the Kingdom of Great Britain. In some histories it is meant to be a ducal territory he would attempt to preserve for himself and his heirs if he were to lose the French Crown. This attempt at legal separation did not survive his reign.

When Henry III (last direct male from Claude of France) died, Brittany passed as part of the Crown to the next heir of France, Henry of Navarre, rather than to Claude's most senior heirs (either Henry II, Duke of Lorraine or Infanta Isabella Clara Eugenia). While these nobles were technically Henry's heirs, there were problems with both claimants to the Ducal crown. The most important issue was that the crown, as a Sovereign Duke, could not be separated from that of the French Crown. Meanwhile, the French Crown and the Spanish Crown had been permanently separated beginning with the reign of Philip of Spain.

In 1582, Henry III of France, last living male-line grandson of Claude, Duchess of Brittany, made Philippe Emmanuel, Duke of Mercœur, his brother-in-law and a leader of Catholic League, governor of Brittany. Invoking the hereditary rights of his wife Marie de Luxembourg, he endeavoured to make himself independent in that province from 1589 onward, and organized a government at Nantes, proclaiming their young son Philippe Louis de Lorraine-Mercœur "prince and duke of Brittany". (Infanta Isabella was the eldest daughter of the eldest sister of Henry III but being female weakened her status, and her position as Infanta all but blocked inheritance to the Breton Duchy.) Through maternal ancestry he was the direct primogenitural heir of Duchess Joan, of the House of Penthièvre, wife of Charles of Blois. Mercœur organized a government at Nantes, supported by the Spaniards. He prevented Henry IV's attempts to subjugate Brittany until 20 March 1598, when Mercœur was forced to surrender. Henry IV then had one of his own illegitimate sons marry the young daughter of the Mercœurs, and thereby assured direct French control of the province. Mercœur subsequently went in exile to Hungary.

The title Duke of Brittany largely ceased to be used as a title of the King of France. When it appeared the title was bestowed by the King of France to one of his direct descendants, and was in any event titular in status. From 1534 on the place is effectively the Province of Brittany.

=== 17th and 18th centuries ===
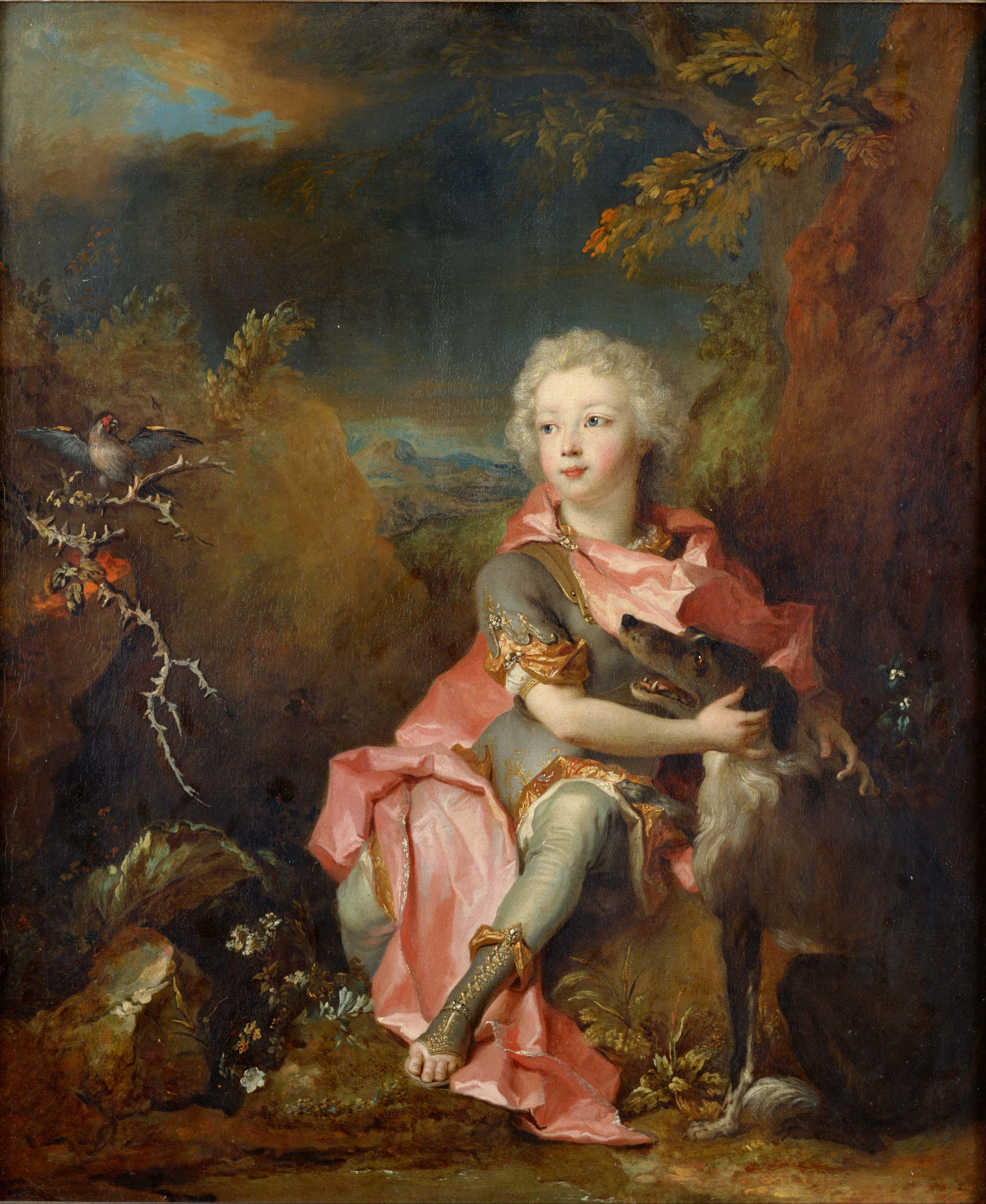
Louis, the last Duke of Brittany, who died aged five

Under the Kings of France the nobles of Brittany continued to enjoy the privileges that had been accorded them by the various independent Dukes of Brittany. Brittany's Celtic legal traditions were maintained, to a degree, and the Estates of Brittany and the Parlement of Rennes were kept separate from the French parliamentary system in Paris. The Breton noble privileges protected in this parliamentary system included exemption from taxes, representation in the Breton Parlement, and the maintenance of Breton titles in the tradition of the Duchy rather than that of France, including, in theory, the application of Brittany's form of semi-Salic, rather than pure Salic Law to the succession issues.

After Henry II, the title Duke of Brittany was not used for over 200 years. The title Duke of Brittany reappeared when a great-grandson of Louis XIV was named Louis, Duke of Brittany; He was the last holder of the title prior to the French Revolution and did not live to inherit the French throne. At his death at age 5, the title in essence became defunct.

Claims on the titular Ducal title by Spanish nobles at various times were not to be considered legitimate by the French, and its use by Louis XIV demonstrated that as the title had merged into the crown of France only the King could assert the title himself or bestow it on another. Louis XIV's actions with regard to the Ducal title also underscored the fact that the Spanish or cadet branch of the House of Bourbon had relinquished all French claims and inheritance rights as a condition of gaining the crown of Spain under the Treaty of Utrecht.

Shortly before the French Revolution the leaders of the Parlement of Rennes issued Remonstrances to Louis XVI, in part to remind the King of his duties as Duke and to preserve the privileges of the Breton people under the Treaty of Union. The King's response was to close the Breton Parlement. The Remonstrances were delivered to the King by Members of the Breton Parlement led by the Comte de Saisy de Kerampuil, and others.

When French King Louis XVI dissolved the Breton Parlement he did so to strengthen his claims as an absolute monarch (where a representative parliament was not necessary). He also did this to advance a centralized federal form of government, but in so doing preserved the nature of the Brittany's autonomy by acknowledging its nobles' traditional privileges, and acted as the Duke of Brittany.

The Breton Parlement has not met since this event. During the French Revolution, the legal state of Brittany was dissolved by the French National Assembly. The province of Brittany was divided and replaced by the 5 départmentes that have continued in the modern French Republic.

== Society, culture and governance ==
=== Economy ===
The north and western parts of the territory relied on a pastoral farming economy; the south-east enjoyed warmer weather and conducted mixed-arable and pastoral farming, based around small holdings. The region enjoyed a strong and diverse maritime economy including active ports of trade and fishing. Over the time of the Duchy, many currencies were present, and the Dukes of Brittany sometimes minted their own coins. Gold and silver were also used for trade.

=== Folklore and legends ===
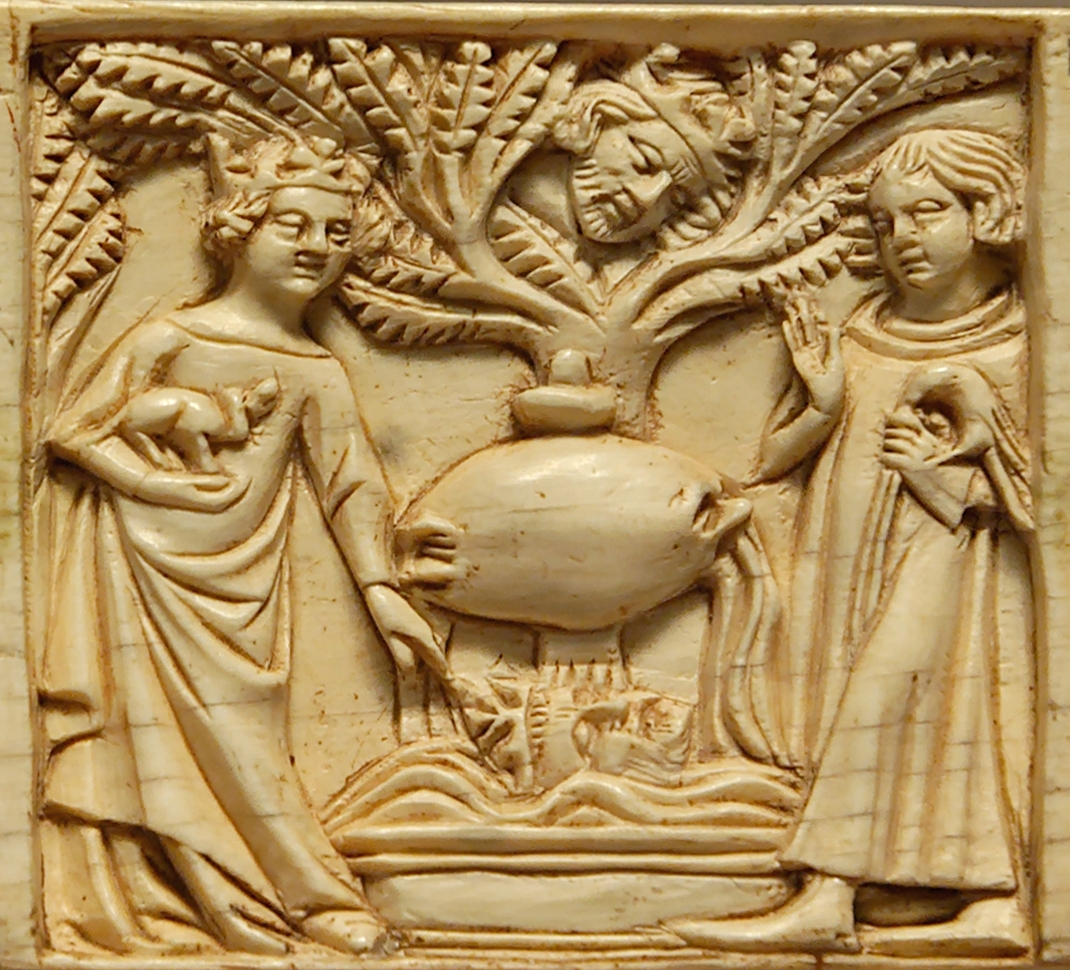
14th-century depiction of the Breton romance Tristan and Iseult

In the 12th century, legends of Conan Meriadoc became popular in North-West Europe. By the 18th century these accounts had been described as mythical.

A reference is made by the chronicler Jordanes to a commander named Riothamus – the Celtic for "supreme leader" – fighting in the region on behalf of the Roman emperor around 470 but little other evidence exists for this period.

The chroniclers of Viking raids in Brittany and Normandy recounted that St Olaf raided the northern coast of Brittany in the area of the town of Dol.

=== Role of the Catholic Church ===
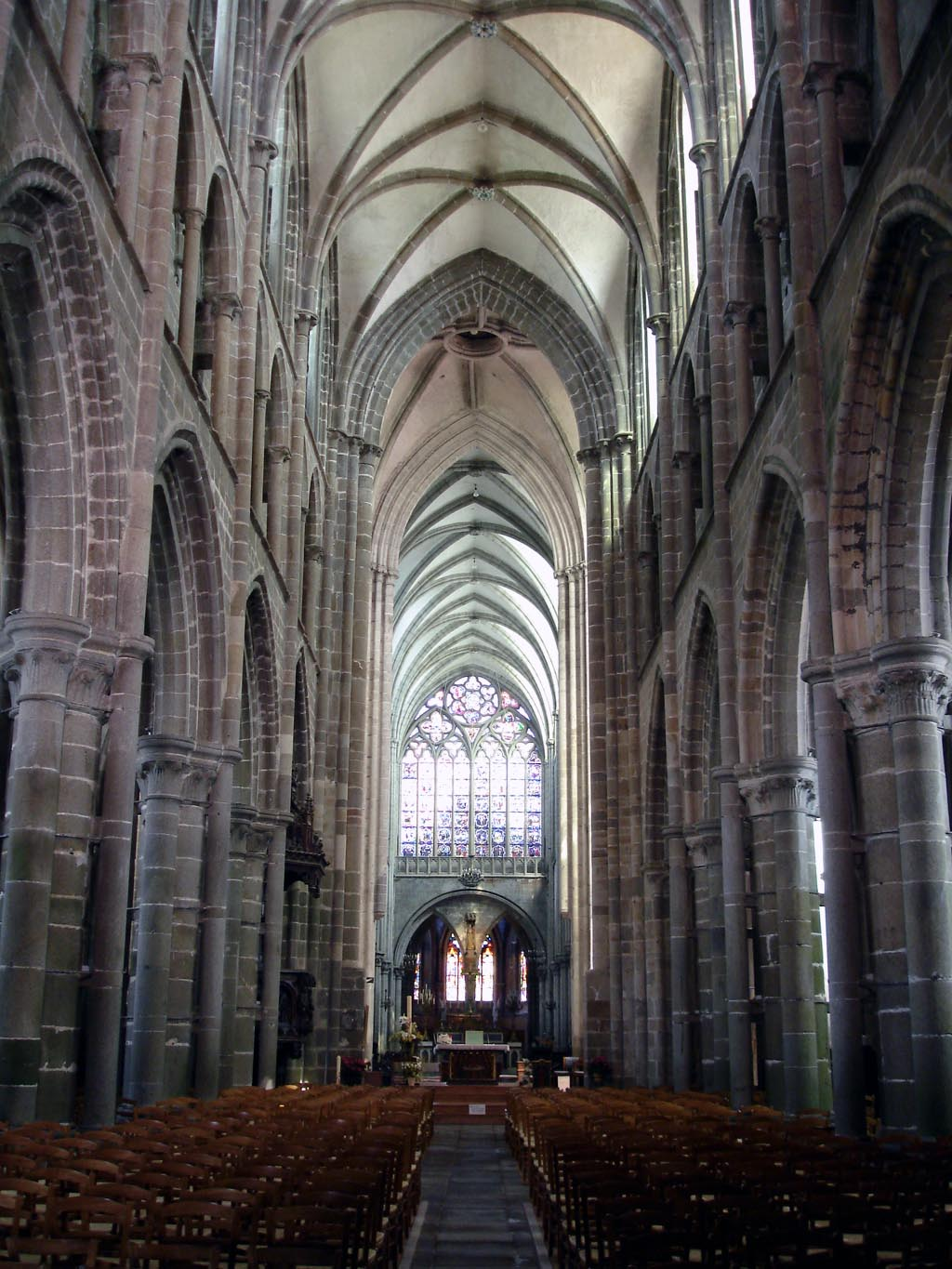
Interior of Dol Cathedral, Seat of the Ancient Archbishopric of Dol, dedicated to St Samson

The Duchy was influenced by the growth of the major monastic orders in the wake of the Gregorian reforms of the 11th century. Backed by the Breton aristocracy, new churches and priories were built and the Church administration became more active. In the 13th century, the new mendicant orders spread across the towns of the Duchy, again with support of the lords who controlled the urban centres. These mendicant orders were popular, and became more so in the 15th century. Relics of local saints remained popular, but relics associated with central Catholic figures such as the Virgin Mary and John the Apostle became increasingly popular in the 13th and 14th centuries.

=== Customs and laws ===
The Duchy that formed in the 10th and the 11th centuries was a feudal society, with laws and customs run through a hierarchy of Breton lords, from the numerous holders of local castles through to the handful of counts and the Duke in the urban centres. This reliance on the mass of local lords was a break with the former Celtic and Carolingian polities in the region. The aristocracy in Breton were, as historians Galliou and Jones describe, "conservative and tenancious" in their outlook, but heavily influenced by French society and culture, which sometimes produced tensions with older, more local traditions and customs.

=== Rise of parliamentary government ===
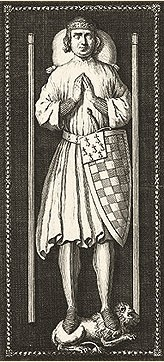
Arthur II

The Estates of Brittany were founded by Arthur II who was considered completely independent of the Kingdom of France. He convoked the first Estates of Brittany in 1309. In addition to creating a parliamentary body, Arthur II added the innovation of including the Third Estate.

These parliamentary bodies figured prominently in the Breton War of Succession and helped to resolve the Ducal Claims of the House of Penthièvre in favor of the House of Montfort. The Estates of Brittany acted during the reign of Francis II, of the House of Montfort, to nullify provisions of the Treaty of Guerande and to confirm that Anne was Francis II's sole and legal Ducal heir. The action in favor of Anne, Duchess of Brittany effectively ended the Ducal claims of the House of Penthièvre.

The Parlement of Rennes was founded in 1485 by Francis II and first met in Vannes. Later the Parlement was moved to Rennes where the Parlement building remains in use to today as a Court of Justice. Initially the Parlement of Rennes functioned as a sovereign court of justice and was designed, among other things, to protect the ancient rights of the Breton nobles. Many of its members were also members of the Estates of Brittany.

After the Duchy of Brittany was merged into the Crown of France, the Parlement of Rennes took on greater responsibility to manage and preserve the rights of the Duchy as separate from the Kingdom of France. While Henry II of France held all rights as Duke of Brittany he was neither frequently present in the Duchy nor entirely inclined to preserve the independent actions of its parliament. As the Kings of France moved to greater centralized authority under Louis XIV, Louis XV, and Louis XVI, tensions between the Kingdom and the Duchy grew. In September 1771, the Parlement was closed by order of Louis XVI; the National Assembly subsequently issued a French law to close the Parlement in 1790. The Parlement of Rennes met and they established that these actions had no force of law based on the Breton laws and traditions on which the Parliament had been founded. Notwithstanding this claim, the Parlement of Rennes has not met since 1790.

=== Richmondshire ===
Nobles from the Breton Ducal family who fought for William the Conqueror in 1066 were the first Lords of Richmond, and eventually the first in a series of Earls of Richmond in England. Alan Rufus was among William's Earls and built Richmond Castle. Conan III allied himself with Stephen of England in his war against the dispossessed Empress Matilda. For his support, Stephen created Conan's son-in-law Alan 1st Earl of Richmond.

Arthur III of Brittany (August 24, 1393 – December 26, 1458), was known as Arthur de Richemont, and was the titular Earl of Richmond. For eleven months at the very end of his life, Arthur was both Duke of Brittany and Count of Montfort, after inheriting those titles upon the death of his nephew. After the death of Arthur's father, John V of Brittany, the English refused to recognize his heirs as earls. Nevertheless, the Breton Dukes continued to style themselves "Count of Richmond", while the English title was given to John of Lancaster (1389–1435) in 1414.

Francis II was host to Henry Tudor, the future Henry VII of England when he fled England to seek safety from Richard III of England. Brittany's possessions in Richmond passed indisputably to England when Francis II, Duke of Brittany, surrendered his rights to Henry, thereby permitting him to take the title Earl of Richmond.

== Legacy ==
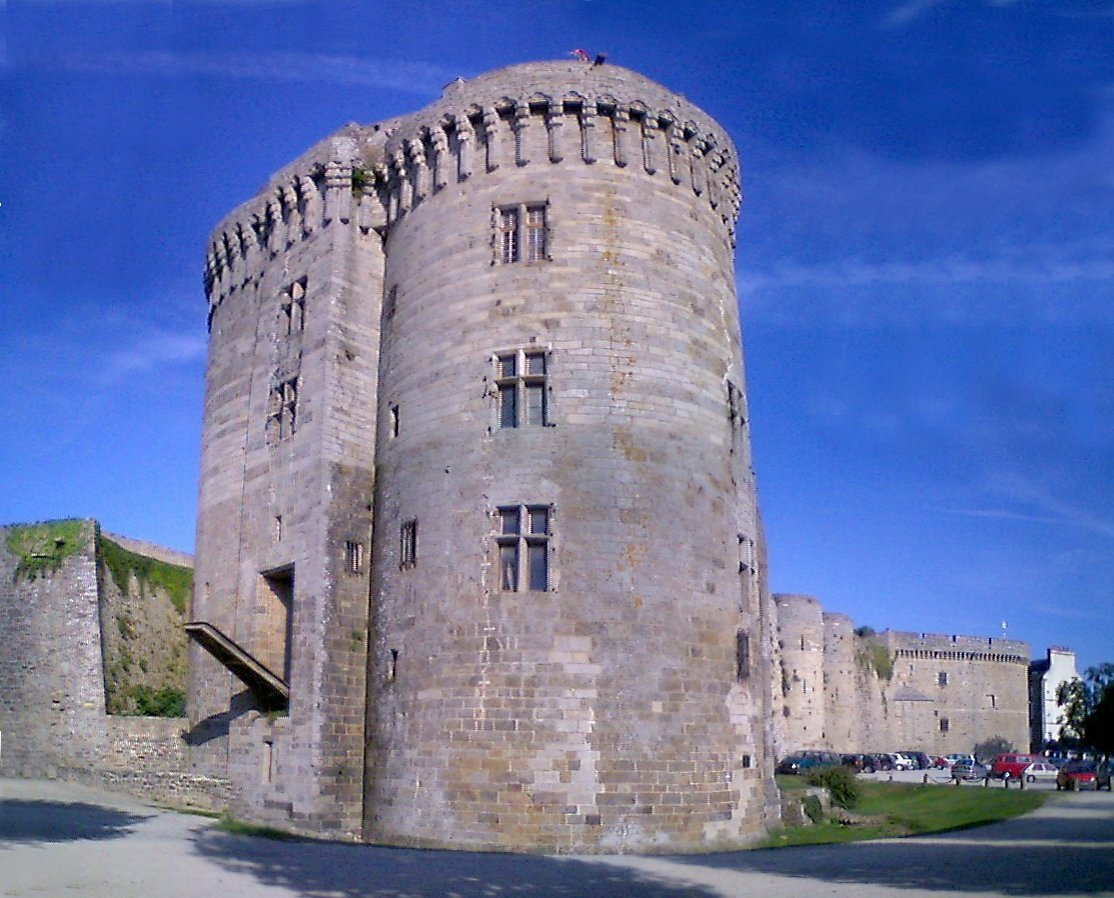
The 14th-century Château de Dinan, the Keep of the Duchesse Anne

There is no modern-day Duchy of Brittany. The Duchy of Brittany and the sovereign title and role of the Duke of Brittany no longer exist in the modern 5th Republic of France. The Breton Parlement no longer exists. Its seat was in Rennes. It was disbanded by Louis XIV but the Parlement voted to ignore the King's order of dissolution upon the claim it alone had the authority to dissolve this legislative and judicial body. Since 1956, there does exist the administrative Region of Brittany – which, however, includes only 80 percent of the former Duchy of Brittany. The remaining 20 percent of the former Duchy is the Loire-Atlantique department which now lies inside the Pays de la Loire region, whose capital, Nantes, was the historical capital of the Duchy of Brittany.

== See also ==
- Charles de Blois Châtillon, the Blessed
- Château des ducs de Bretagne (Castle of the Dukes of Brittany) in Nantes
- Dukes of Brittany family tree
- List of religious figures of Brittany
- List of rulers of Brittany
- List of consorts of Brittany
- Union between Brittany and France

== Bibliography ==
- Bachrach, Bernard S. (1993). Fulk Nerra the Neo-Roman Consul, 987-1040: A Political Biography of the Angevin Count. University of California Press. ISBN 0-520-07996-5.
- Booton, Diane E. (2010). Manuscripts, Market and the Transition to Print in Late Medieval Brittany. Ashgate Publishing. ISBN 9780754666233.
- Bradbury, Jim (2000). The Capetians: Kings of France, 987-1328. London: Hambledon Continuum. ISBN 978-1-85285-528-4.
- The Columbia Encyclopedia in One Volume. Morningside Heights, New York City, New York, USA: Columbia University Press, Clarke F Ansley, Editor in Chief. 1935.
- Crouch, David (2002). The Normans: The History of a Dynasty. London: Hambledon. ISBN 978-1-85285-595-6.
- Delumeau, Jean (1969). Histoire de la Bretagne. Toulouse, France: Edouard Privat editeur; Jean Delumeau, directeur, with contributing authors P-R Giot, J L'Helgouach, J Briard, J-B Colbert de Beaulieu, L Pape, P Rache, G Devailly, H Touchard, J Meyer, A Mussat, and G Le Guen (chapters do not specify individual authors).
- Everard, Judith A. (2000). Brittany and the Angevins: Province and Empire 1158–1203. Cambridge, UK: Cambridge University Press. ISBN 978-0-521-66071-6.
- Frélaut, Bertrand (2000). Histoire de Vannes. Éditions Jean-Paul Gisserot. ISBN 2-87747-527-1.
- Galliou, Patrick; Jones, Michael (1991). The Bretons. Oxford, England and Cambridge, US: Blackwells. ISBN 9780631164067.
- Hallam, Elizabeth M.; Everard, Judith A. (2001). Capetian France, 987–1328 (2nd ed.). Harlow, England: Longman. ISBN 978-0-582-40428-1.
- Hjardar, Kim; Vike, Vegard (2016). Vikings at War. Casemate Publishers.
- Howarth, David (2008). 1066: The Year of the Conquest. Paw Prints. ISBN 978-1-4395-1242-5.
- Jones, Michael (1988). The Creation of Brittany: A Late Medieval State. London: Hambledon Press. ISBN 0-907628-80-X.
- Keats-Rohan (1992). "The Bretons and Normans of England 1066–1154" Nottingham Medieval Studies (PDF). Archived from the original (PDF) on 2011-07-24.
- Nouailhat, Yves Henri (1979). Bretagne: écologie, économie, art, littérature, langue, histoire, traditions populaires, in vol. 16. d'Encyclopédies régionales. France: Le Puy, C Bonneton editor.
- Patterson, Benton Rain (2004). Harold and William; The Battle for England, A.D. 1064–1066. The History Press. ISBN 978-0-7524-2984-7.
- Price, Neil S. (1989). The Vikings in Brittany. Viking Society for Northern Research, University College London. ISBN 978-0-903521-22-2.
- Small, Graeme (2009). Late Medieval France. Palgrave Macmillan. ISBN 9781137102157.
- Smith, Julia M. H. (1992). Province and Empire: Brittany and the Carolingians. Cambridge, UK: Cambridge University Press. ISBN 978-0-521-38285-4.
