= Bourgueil Abbey =

Abbey in Indre-et-Loire, France

- Abbaye Saint-Pierre de Bourgueil-en-Vallée
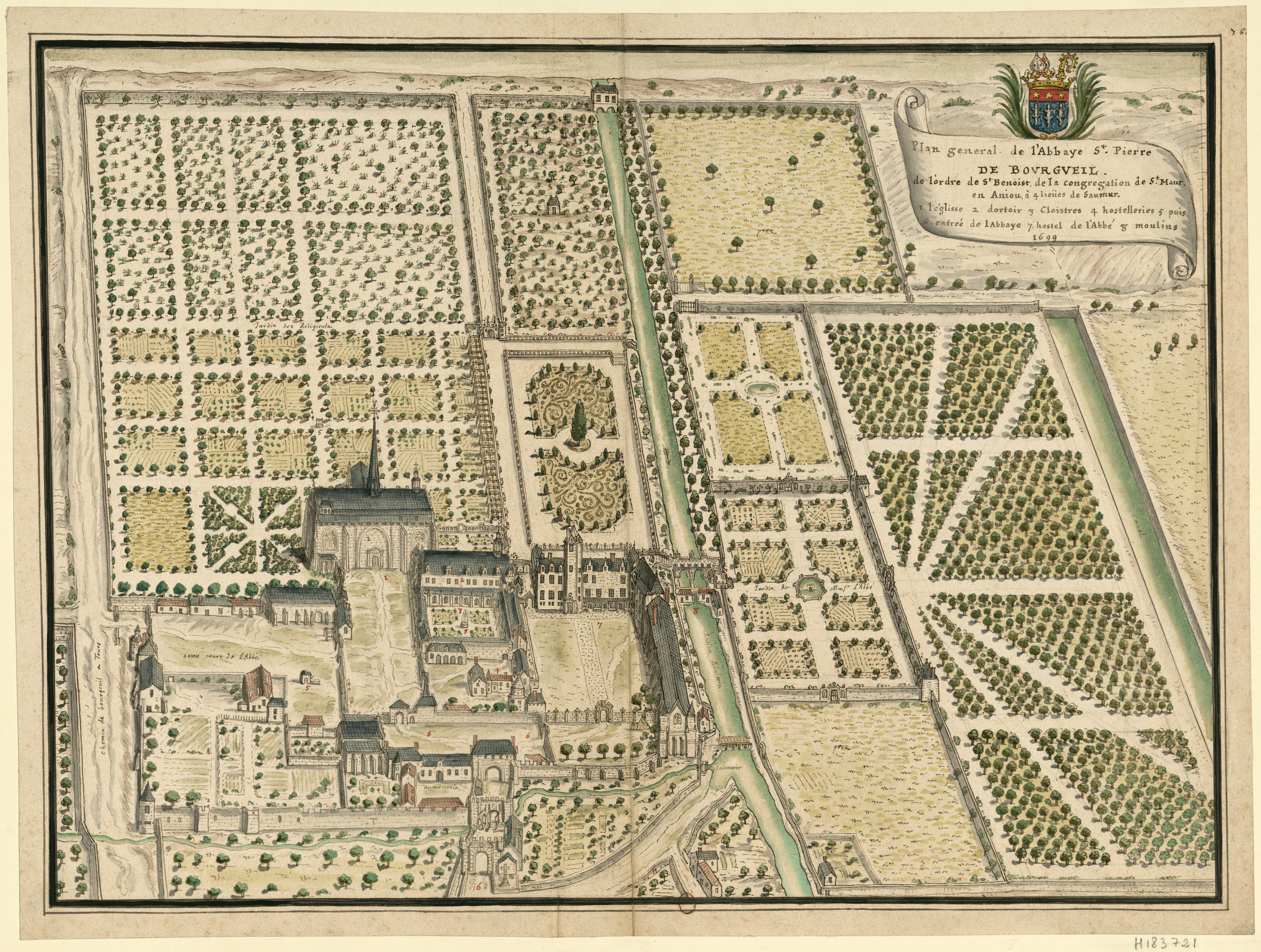
- Plan of Bourgueil Abbey, c. 1600

- Location within France

Site
- Location: Bourgueil, France
- Coordinates: 47°16′46″N 0°10′18″E

Bourgueil Abbey (French: Abbaye Saint-Pierre de Bourgueil-en-Vallée) was a Benedictine monastery located at Bourgueil, historically in Anjou, currently in Indre-et-Loire and the diocese of Angers. The founder was Emma of Blois, daughter of Theobald I of Blois, and by her marriage, duchess of Aquitaine.

== History ==
Bourgueil was formerly a mansio known as Burgolium set up on the Roman main road from Angers to Tours, at a point where other Roman routes converged. Before 977, these lands belonged to Theobald I of Blois. He gave them as dowry for his daughter Emma. At this point a priory already existed at Bourgueil.

Emma of Blois, tired of her philandering husband William IV of Aquitaine (935-995), and particularly of his liaison with Aldéarde of Thouars, wife of Herbert I of Thouars, had her rival beaten up and raped. Emma then fled with her young son, the future William V of Aquitaine, to her brother Odo I, Count of Blois, at the château de Chinon. The penitent Emma founded the abbey, in the town of Bourgeuil, in 990. The family was pious and Odo was a lay abbot of St. Martin's Abbey, Tours, and Marmoutier Abbey. There were also political reasons, in the Loire region, for the family to stand up to Hugh Capet.

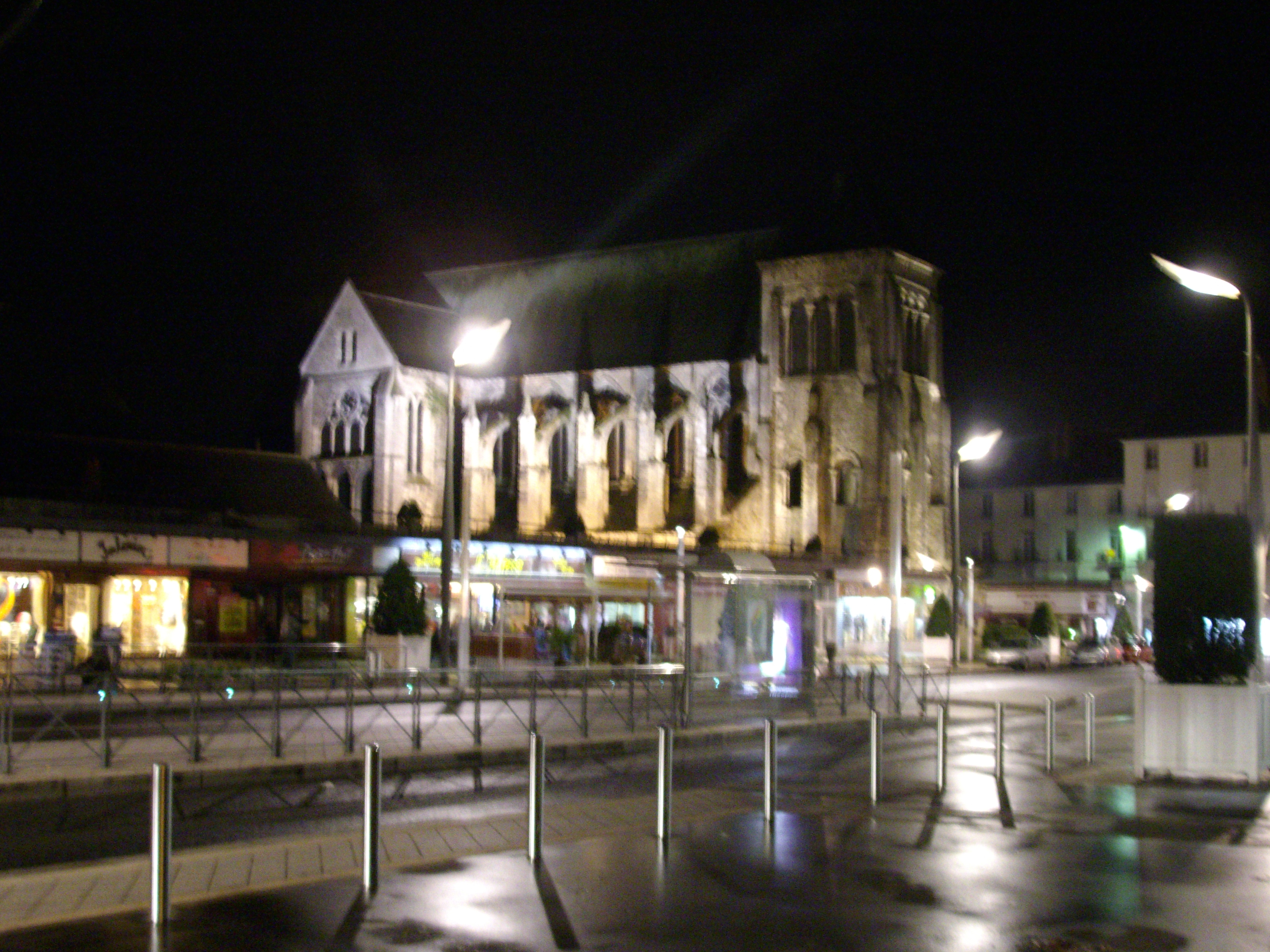
The founding group of monks came from St. Julian's Abbey, Tours

The abbey's rich endowment likely came from several sources, principally Emma's uncle Herbert III of Omois, but also her husband's estate, which included Brolium, Longua-Aqua, Oziacum and Vendeia: Le Breuil, Longève, Gazais and La Vendée in Poitou. William V also contributed. The possessions - land and a large forest, and feudal and seigneurial rights down to the waters of the Loire - were later counted as a barony.

From the 12th century, the abbey acquired 42 dependent priories and 64 parishes in the Angoumois, Île-de-France. Abbot Breton is credited with introducing winegrowing to the area while the abbot Baudry de Bourgueil was a poet who praised in verse the wine cultivated locally by the monks.

In 1630 it was attached to the Congregation of Saint-Maur.

In the 20th century, the Abbey was home to a community of nuns.

Today, it comprises 13th and 18th-century buildings, together with 10th century ruins. It houses a cinema open to the public while some of the cloisters, infirmary refectory with original wooden panelling and the interesting ornamental staircase are open for tours, together with the old monks' cells which now house a museum of arts and local traditions.
