= Drogo of Brittany =

Drogo was the count of Vannes and Nantes and duke of Brittany from 952, when he succeeded his father, Alan Wrybeard, until his death in 958.

Drogo was a minor throughout his reign, and so he was under a Regency. Drogo's Regents were his uncle the Count of Blois, Theobald I (who entrusted the administration of the Duchy to Wicohen, Archbishop of Dol, and the Count of Rennes, Juhel Berengar) and his stepfather the Count of Anjou, Fulk II, who married the Wrybeard's widow.

The Chronique de Nantes suggests that Drogo was murdered on the orders of Fulk II, Count of Anjou.

== Sources ==
- Hagger, Mark S. (2017). Norman Rule in Normandy, 911-1144. The Boydell Press.

== See also ==
- Dukes of Brittany family tree

Regnal titles
Preceded by Alan II	Duke of Brittany; 952–958	Succeeded by Hoël I
