= Fulk II of Anjou =

Count of Anjou from 942 to 960

- Count of Anjou
- Born: c. 905
- Died: 960; Tours
- Noble family: Ingelger
- Spouses: Gerberge; Widow of Alan II
- Issue Detail: Geoffrey I, Count of Anjou; Adelaide-Blanche of Anjou
- Father: Fulk I of Anjou
- Mother: Roscille de Lochar

Fulk II of Anjou (c. 905 – 960), called le Bon ("the Good"), was Count of Anjou from 942 to his death.

== Life ==
Fulk II, born c. 905, was a son of Fulk the Red and his wife Roscilla de Loches, daughter of Warnerius, Seigneur de Villentrois. He succeeded his father in 942 as the second Count of Anjou, and remained in power until 960.

By this time, the Angevins, Fulk II included, had become particularly adept at establishing marriage alliances that furthered their goals. His father, Fulk the Red, had arranged his marriage to Gerberga, daughter of Geoffrey of Nevers and Aba. (Note: The assumption of Bernard S. Bachrach, stating Gerberga was a daughter of Ratburnus I, Viscount of Vienne, is not consistent.) Among other things, this alliance enabled Fulk to open the doors towards Aquitaine for his daughter, Adelaide-Blanche, to marry a future king of France and for his son Guy to become Bishop of le Puy.

After Gerberga's death c. 952, Fulk made another astute political marriage to the widow of Alan II, Duke of Brittany. Alan II had also been Count of Nantes and through this marriage Fulk gained influence in, and possibly control of, Nantes. His second wife was also the sister of Theobald I, Count of Blois, which permitted Fulk II to form an alliance with the House of Blois. He is said to have ordered the murder of Drogo, Duke of Brittany, Alan II's son with the latter, according to the Chronique de Nantes.

== Family ==
Fulk and Gerberge had:

- Adelaide-Blanche of Anjou, married Stephen count of Gevaudan and Forez
- Geoffrey I, Count of Anjou, married Adelaide of Vermandois
- Bouchard, Count of Vendome.
- Guy of Anjou, Bishop of le Puy
- Humbert d'Anjou, mentioned 957.

Fulk II had no known issue with his second wife.

== Death ==
Fulk died in 960. He was succeeded by his son Geoffrey Greymantle.

== Sources ==
- Bachrach, Bernard S. (1978). "The Idea of the Angevin Empire". Albion: A Quarterly Journal Concerned with British Studies. 10 (4 (Winter)).
- Bachrach, Bernard S. (1993). Fulk Nerra the Neo-Roman Consul, 987-1040. University of California Press.
- Bradbury, Jim (2007). The Capetians: Kings of France, 987-1328. Hambledon Continuum.
- Keats-Rohan, K.S.B. (1997). Family Trees and the Root of Politics; A Prosopography of Britain and France from the Tenth to the Twelfth Century. The Boydell Press.
- Riché, Pierre (1993). The Carolingians; A Family Who Forged Europe. Translated by Allen, Michael Idomir. University of Pennsylvania Press.
- Settipani, Christian (1997). "Les comtes d'Anjou et leurs alliances aux Xe et XIe siècles". In Keats-Rohan, K.S.B. (ed.). Family trees and the Roots of Politics. The Boydell Press. pp. 211–268.

Fulk II of Anjou Angevins Died: 958
Preceded by Fulk I	Count of Anjou; 942–958	Succeeded by Geoffrey I
