= Odo I of Blois =

Count of Blois (c. 950 – 996)

Odo I, Count of Blois
- Born: c. 950
- Died: 12 March 996; Marmoutier monastery in Tours
- Noble family: House of Blois
- Spouse: Bertha of Burgundy
- Issue: Theobald II of Blois; Odo II, Count of Blois
- Father: Theobald I of Blois
- Mother: Luitgard

Odo I (also spelled Eudes) (c. 950 – 12 March 996), Count of Blois, Chartres, Reims, Châteaudun and Omois, lord of Provins, was the son of Theobald I of Blois and Luitgard, daughter of Herbert II of Vermandois. He received the title of count palatine from King Lothair of West Francia.

Like his relations, the counts of Vermandois, he remained faithful to the Carolingians against the Capetians. Following the war between his father and Odalric, Archbishop of Reims, over the castle of Coucy, he received the castle to hold it from the archbishop.

In the 970s, in the wars for control of Brittany, he subjugated the county of Rennes and Count Conan I affirmed the rights of his family in the region. Around 977, his father died and he succeeded in the counties his father held at the time of his death.

In 987, Odo supported Charles of Lorraine against Hugh Capet. In June 991, he took Melun. Hugh Capet, Bouchard of Vendome, Richard I of Normandy and Fulk Nerra, assembled against him and retook Melun in late 991.

Near 995, he entered into a war against Fulk, who was already at war with Geoffrey I of Brittany. Odo allied with his brother-in-law William IV of Aquitaine and Baldwin IV of Flanders. Even his old enemy, Richard of Normandy joined in the war on Fulk. In the winter of 995 – 996, they besieged Langeais, however Odo became ill and was taken to the monastery of Marmoutier at Tours where he died on 12 March 996.

== Family ==
Odo married Bertha of Burgundy, daughter of King Conrad of Burgundy and Matilda of France. Their children were:

- Theobald II (d. 1004)
- Odo II (c. 983–1037)
- Heloise
- Agnes, married Viscount Geoffrey II of Thouars
- Robert (died between 980 and 996)

== Sources ==
- Abel, Mickey (2012). "Emma of Blois as Arbiter of Peace and the Politics". In Martin, Therese (ed.). Reassessing the Roles of Women as 'Makers' of Medieval Art and Architecture. Vol. 1. Brill.
- Bachrach, Bernard S. (1993). Fulk Nerra, the Neo-Roman Consul, 987-1040: A Political Biography of the Angevin Count. University of California Press.
- Bennett, Matthew; Bradbury, Jim; DeVries, Kelly; Dickie, Iain; Jestice, Phyllis, eds. (2005). Fighting Techniques of the Medieval World: Equipment, Combat Skills and Tactics. St. Martin's Press.
- Bourchard, Constance Brittain (1999). "Burgundy and Provence 879-1032". In Reuter, Timothy (ed.). The New Cambridge Medieval History. Vol. III. Cambridge University Press.
- Bradbury, Jim (2007). The Capetians: The History of a Dynasty. Hambledon Continuum.
- Dunbabin, Jean (1985). France in the Making, 843-1180. Oxford University Press.
- Mews, Constant J. (2006). "Negotiating the Boundaries of Gender in Religious Life: Robert of Arbrissel and Hersende, Abelard and Heloise". Viator: Medieval and Renaissance Studies. 37. Brepols Publishers: 113–148.
- Weinfurter, Stefan (1999). The Salian Century: Main Currents in an Age of Transition. Translated by Bowlus, Barbara M. University of Pennsylvania Press.

Odo I of Blois House of Blois Born: c. 950 Died: 12 March 996
Preceded by Theobald I	Count of Blois; 975–995	Succeeded by Theobald II
