= Emma of Blois =

Duchess of Aquitaine (c. 950 – 1003)

Duchess of Aquitaine
- Born: c. 950
- Died: 27 December 1004/5
- Burial: Centre-Val de Loire
- Spouse: William IV, Duke of Aquitaine
- Issue: William V, Duke of Aquitaine; Ebles
- House: House of Blois
- Father: Theobald I, Count of Blois
- Mother: Luitgarde of Vermandois

Emma of Blois (c. 950 – 27 December 1004/5) was Duchess of Aquitaine by marriage to William IV, Duke of Aquitaine. She ruled Aquitaine as regent for her son, William V, Duke of Aquitaine, from 996 until 1004.

== Life ==
Born c. 950, Emma was the daughter of Theobald I, Count of Blois and Luitgarde of Vermandois. In 968, she married William IV, Duke of Aquitaine. His overindulging in hunting and women offended her greatly. Around 990, he retired to a monastery. During the course of her marriage, she founded the monastery of Saint Peter in Bourgueil and the abbey of Maillezais. Emma then ruled Aquitaine as regent for their son William V.

Emma died sometime after 27 December 1004/5.

== See also ==
- Dukes of Aquitaine family tree
