= Theobald II of Blois =

Count of Blois (d.1004)

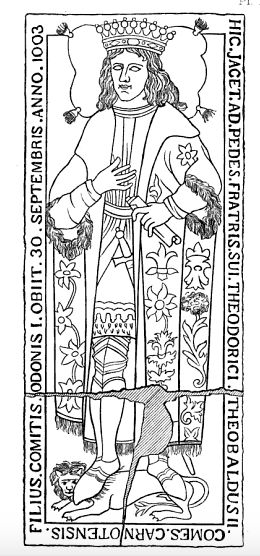
Non-contemporary slab marking the tomb of Theobald II in the Abbey of Saint-Père-en-Vallée

Theobald II, Count of Blois (Thibaut II; d. 1004) was the eldest son and heir of Odo I, Count of Blois, and Bertha of Burgundy.

The stepson of Robert II of France, he became Count of Blois, Châteaudun, Chartres and Reims after the death of his father in 996. Theobald II left no heirs; on his death, he was succeeded by his younger brother, Odo II, Count of Blois.

Preceded by Odo I	Count of Blois; 995–1004	Succeeded by Odo II
