= Theobald the Elder =

French noble

Theobald le Vieux of Blois
- Born: c. 890
- Died: c. 940
- Noble family: House of Blois (founder)
- Spouse: Richildis
- Issue: Theobald I, Count of Blois

Theobald the Elder (in French: Théobald le Vieux or Thibaud l'Ancien, c. 890 – c. 940) was a Viscount of Tours and Blois in West Francia. He is the first known member of the House of Blois.

== Biography ==
Theobald the Elder, from 908 on, was Viscount of Tours. He replaced Warnegald as Viscount of Blois before 920. He was a faithful of the Marquis of Neustria, Robert I then Hugh the Great. In the first half of the 920s, Robertian power entered Aquitaine at Saint-Aignan, Vierzon and Aix-d'Angillon. A charter of the Cartulary of Vierzon shows that King Rudolph and Hugh the Great relied on Thibaud.

He was well known for being the father of Theobald I, Count of Blois who fought against Richard I in 960.

== Family ==
Theobald the Elder and Richildis had:

- Theobald I, Count of Blois (before 913–c.977)
- Richard of Blois, Archbishop of Bourges (d.969)

And may also have had

- Daughter (name unknown) married Alan II, Duke of Brittany

== Sources ==
- Devailly, Guy (1973). Le Berry du X siecle au milieu du XIII (in French). Mouton & Co.
- LoPrete, Kimberly A. (2007). Adela of Blois: Countess and Lord (c.1067-1137). Four Courts Press.
