= Mathuedoï I of Poher =

Mathuedoï I (circa 875 - 930) was a Count of Poher. He was the son - in - law of Alan I, King of Brittany, known as Alan the Great through his marriage to Hawise of Vannes. (Note: His mother Orequen is understood to have married Alain de Poher but the written histories to support this claim are sparse.) He obtained his countship at Alan's death circa 907. He is listed in several ecclesiastical records at Redon Abbey.

== Life ==
At Alan I's death the rule of Brittany became fractured even as the region faced Viking invasions. Mathuedoï and his cousin Gourmaelon, the Count of Cornouailles, stood in line to succeed Alan I as ruler of Brittany. Mathuedoï renounced his claim as Viking invasions of Brittany increased. Subsequent to the invasion of the Loire Viking fleet led by Rognvaldr, he exiled himself and his son Alan Barbecorte to England in 924.

According to the Chronicle of Nantes:

Fugit autem tunc temporis Mathuedoi, comes de Poher, ad regem Anglorum Adelstanum cum ingenti multitudine Britonum, ducens secum filium suum, nomine Alanum, qui postea cognominatus est Barbatorta, quem Alanum ex filia Alani Magni, Britonum ducis, genuerat, et quem ipse rex Angliae Adelstannus jam prius ex lavaero sancto susceperat. Ipse rex pro familiaritate et amicitia hujus regenerationis magnam in eo fidem habebat. (Chronicle of Nantes, chapter 27)	"... Among the nobles who fled for fear for the Danes, Mathuedoi, the count of Poher, put to sea with a great multitude of Bretons, and went to Athelstan, king of the English, taking with him his son, called Alan, who was afterwards surnamed "Crooked Beard". He had had this Alan by the daughter of Alan the Great, duke of the Bretons, and the same Athelstan, king of England, had lifted him from the holy font. This king had great trust in him because of this friendship and the alliance of this baptism."

While Mathuedoï would remain in England, his son Alan returned to Brittany about 12 years later, and with Athelstan's assistance would expel the Vikings.

== Bibliography ==
- Price, Neil S. (1989). The Vikings of Brittany. Saga-Book XXII 6. ISBN 978 0 903521 22 2.

== Other reading ==
- André Chédeville & Hubert Guillotel La Bretagne des saints et des rois Ve-Xe siècle. Éditions Ouest France (1984) ISBN 2858826137
