= Luitgarde of Vermandois =

10th-century French noblewoman

- Born: c. 914
- Died: 9 February 978
- Noble family: Herbertian dynasty
- Spouses: William I of Normandy; Theobald I of Blois
- Issue: Hugh, Archbishop of Borges; Emma of Blois; Odo I, Count of Blois
- Father: Herbert II, Count of Vermandois
- Mother: Adele of France

Luitgarde of Vermandois (c. 914 – 9 February 978) was a noblewoman from the Herbertian dynasty who lived in West Francia. She was a countess consort of Rouen and Normandy by her first marriage, and a countess consort of Blois and Chartres by her second. She was a daughter of Herbert II of Vermandois, and Adele, daughter of Robert I of France. She first married William I of Normandy before 940. As a widow, following his death in 942, she married Theobald I of Blois in 943 or 944.

She had at least three children from her second marriage:

- Hugh, Archbishop of Bourges (d. 985)
- Odo (d. 996), count of Blois
- Emma (d. 1003), married William IV of Aquitaine

== Sources ==
- Fanning, Steven; Bachrach, Bernard S., eds. (2011). The Annals of Flodoard of Reims, 916–966. University of Toronto Press.
- McKitterick, Rosamond (1999). The Frankish Kingdoms under the Carolingians, 751-987. Longman.

Luitgarde of Vermandois Herbertian dynasty Born: c. 914 Died: 9 February 978
Preceded by Poppa of Bayeux	Countess consort of Normandy; 940–942	Succeeded by Emma of Paris
New title	Countess consort of Blois and Chartres; 944–978	Succeeded by Bertha of Burgundy
