= Trans-la-Forêt =

Trans-la-Forêt Treant-ar-C'hoad (Breton)
- Commune
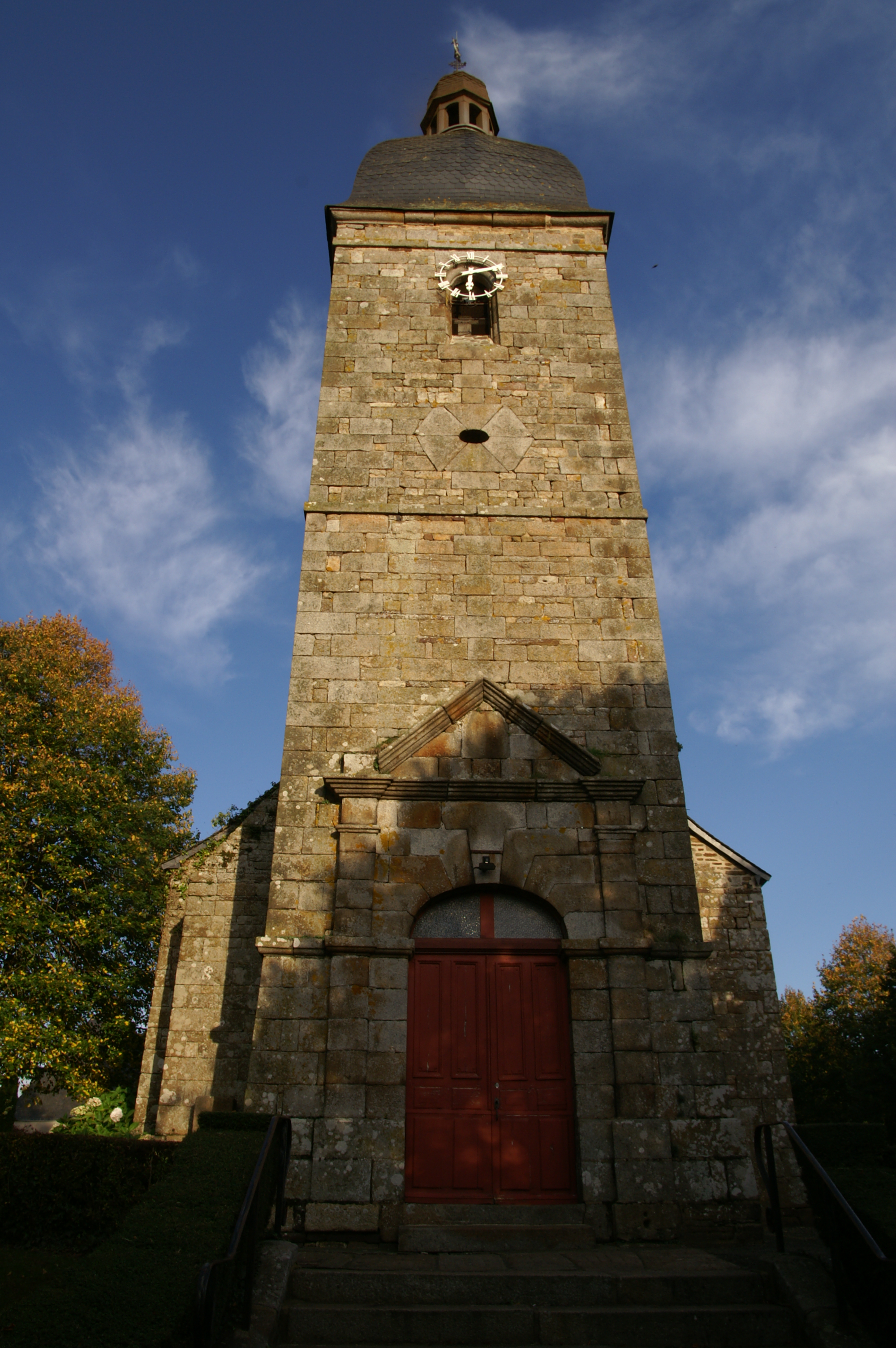
- The church in Trans-la-Forêt
- Location of Trans-la-Forêt
- Location within France Location within Brittany
- Coordinates: 48°29′51″N 1°35′15″W
- Country: France
- Region: Brittany
- Department: Ille-et-Vilaine
- Arrondissement: Saint-Malo
- Canton: Dol-de-Bretagne

Government
  - Mayor (2020–2026): Jeannine Lejanvre
- Area^{1}: 14.83 km^{2} (5.73 sq mi)
- Highest elevation: 117 m (384 ft)
- Lowest elevation: 33 m (108 ft)
- Population (2023): 634
  - Density: 42.8/km^{2} (111/sq mi)
- Time zone: UTC+01:00 (CET)
  - Summer (DST): UTC+02:00 (CEST)
- INSEE/Postal code: 35339 /35610
- ^{1} French Land Register data, which excludes lakes, ponds, glaciers > 1 km^{2} (0.386 sq mi or 247 acres) and river estuaries.

Trans-la-Forêt (before 1996: Trans; Breton: Treant-ar-C'hoad, before 2014: Treant-Felger) is a commune in the department of Ille-et-Vilaine, Brittany, northwestern France.

It is the site of the 939 AD Battle of Trans-la-Forêt.

== Population ==
Historical population
Year	Pop.	±% p.a.
1968	747	—
1975	670	−1.54%
1982	637	−0.72%
1990	594	−0.87%
1999	583	−0.21%
2007	571	−0.26%
2012	541	−1.07%
2017	583	+1.51%
2023	634	+1.41%
Source: INSEE

== See also ==
- Communes of the Ille-et-Vilaine department
