= Alan II of Brittany =

Duke of Brittany from 938 to 952

Alan II
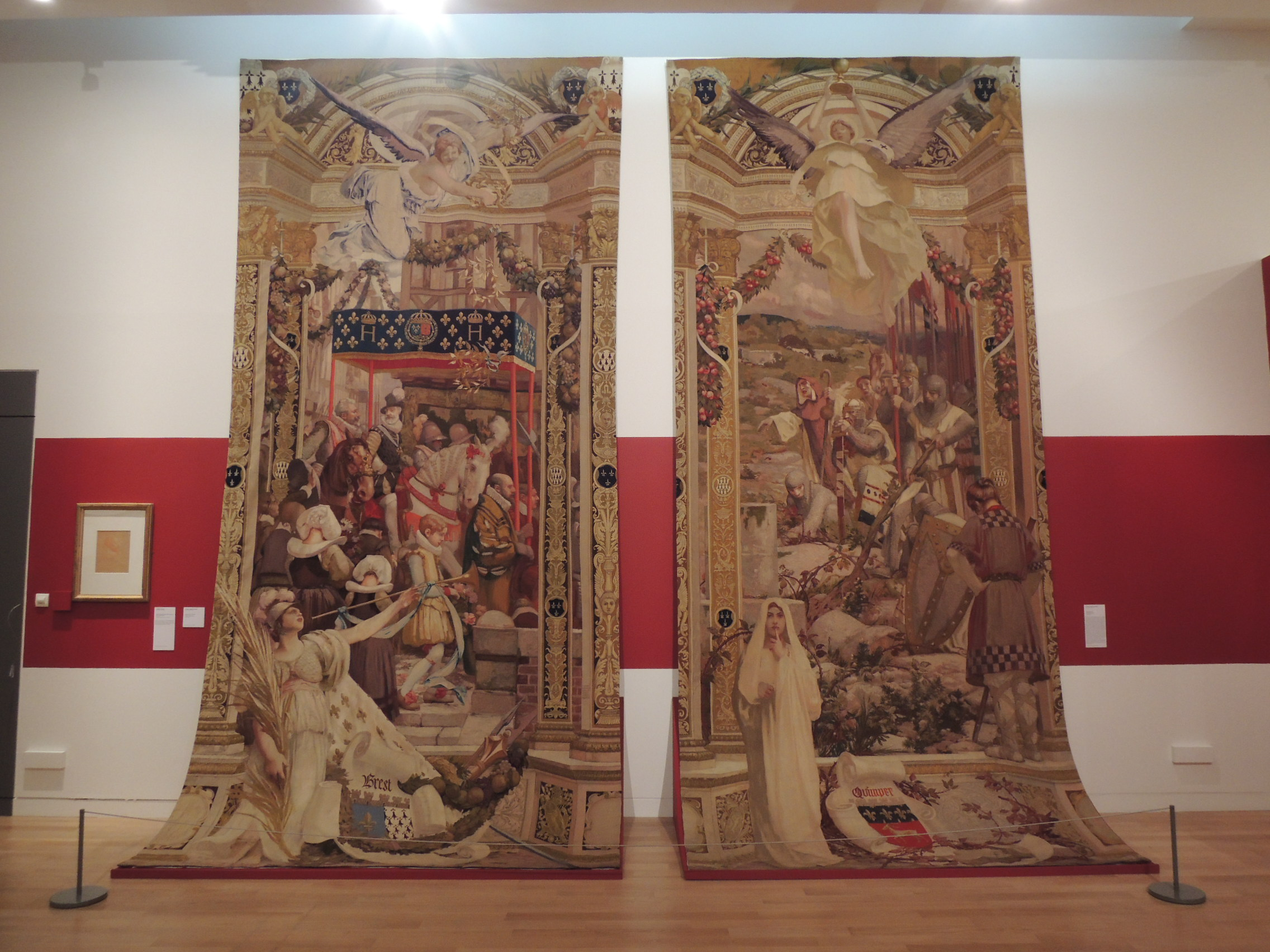
- Tapestries depicting Henry IV of France and Duke Alan II

Duke of Brittany
- Reign: 938–952
- Successor: Drogo
- Born: c. 900
- Died: 952; Nantes
- Issue: Drogo, Duke of Brittany; Guerech, Duke of Brittany; Hoël I, Duke of Brittany
- House: House of Nantes
- Father: Mathuedoï I, Count of Poher
- Mother: daughter of Alan I (name unknown)

Alan II (c. 900 – 952), nicknamed Wrybeard or Twistedbeard, Alan Varvek in Breton, was Count of Vannes, Poher and Nantes, and Duke of Brittany from 938 to his death. He was the grandson of King Alan the Great by Alan's daughter and her husband Mathuedoï I, Count of Poher. He expelled the Vikings/Norsemen from Brittany after an occupation that lasted from 907 to about 939.

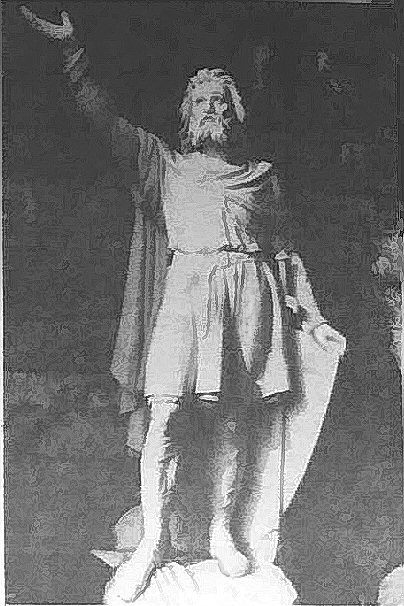
Statue of Alan Twistedbeard, work of Amédée Ménard, in the courtyard of the castle of the Dukes of Brittany in Nantes (1976)

== The Vikings ==
=== Refuge in Britain ===
Alan had to take refuge, along with his father Mathuedoi I, with King Æthelstan of England because the Norsemen had invaded Armorica. The Chronicle of Nantes reports:

Fugit autem tunc temporis Mathuedoi, comes de Poher, ad regem Anglorum Adelstanum cum ingenti multitudine Britonum, ducens secum filium suum, nomine Alanum, qui postea cognominatus est Barbatorta, quem Alanum ex filia Alani Magni, Britonum ducis, genuerat, et quem ipse rex Angliae Adelstannus jam prius ex lavaero sancto susceperat. Ipse rex pro familiaritate et amicitia hujus regenerationis magnam in eo fidem habebat. (Chronicle of Nantes, chapter 27)	"... Among the nobles who fled for fear for the Danes, Mathuedoi, the count of Poher, put to sea with a great multitude of Bretons, and went to Æthelstan, king of the English, taking with him his son, called Alan, who was afterwards surnamed "Crooked Beard". He had had this Alan by the daughter of Alan the Great, duke of the Bretons, and the same Æthelstan, king of England, had lifted him from the holy font. This king had great trust in him because of this friendship and the alliance of this baptism."

Alan became ruler of Brittany at the end of a 33-year interregnum after the death of his maternal grandfather, Duke Alan the Great.

=== Return to Brittany ===
Alan landed at Dol in 936, at the invitation of a monk, Jean de Landévennec, and with the aid of Æthelstan. By 937 Alan was master of most of Brittany, having forced the Norsemen back to the Loire.

Sique civitas Namnetico per plures annos derelicta, vastata et vepribus spinisque occupata remansit, donec Alanus Barbatorta, Alani Magnus nepos, surrexit et hos Normannos ab omni regione Britannien et a fluvio Ligeris, qui illis erat nutrimentum magnum, omnino depulsos dejecit. Iste vero Alanus cum rege Anglorum Adelstano ab infantia fuit nutritus, corpore validus et fortitur audax, apros et ursos in silva minime curans eos cum ferro occidere nisi cum lignis silvae. Congregata navium parvitate, cum his Brttannis, qui libidem adhue superstites erant, venit per licentiam régis revisere Britanniam. (Chronicle of Nantes, chapter 29)	"... The city of Nantes remained for many years deserted, devastated and overgrown with briars and thorns, until Alan Crooked Beard, grandson of Alan the Great, arose and cast out those Norsemen from the whole region of Brittany and from the river Loire, which was a great support for them. This Alan was brought up from infancy with Athelstan, king of the Anglo-Saxons, and was strong in body and very courageous, and did not care to kill wild boars and bears in the forest with an iron weapon, but with a wooden staff. He collected a few ships and came by the king's permission with those Bretons who were still living there, to revisit Brittany."

In 938, Alan was elected Brittonum dux. On 1 August 939, with the aid of Judicael (Berengar), count of Rennes, and Hugh I, Count of Maine, his victory was made complete by defeating the Norse at the Battle of Trans-la-Forêt. Alan declared that date a national holiday.

== Louis IV of France and other alliances ==
Alan II was closely allied with King Louis IV of West Francia, as both were exiles in England together at the court of Edward the Elder and Edward's son and successor Æthelstan. Alan renounced the Cotentin, Avranchin and Mayenne and paid homage to Louis IV in 942. He was also allied to Theobald the Old, the count of Chartres.

== Family ==
Alan II was the grandson of Alan I, King of Brittany and the great-grandson of Ridoreth, Count of Vannes. He was the grand-nephew of Pascweten.

His wife was a sister or a daughter of Count Theobald I of Blois. Their son, and Alan's immediate successor, was Drogo, Duke of Brittany.

He also had at least two illegitimate sons, Hoël and Guerech, who would each succeed Drogo during the fractured rule of Brittany after Drogo's death.

== Death ==
Alan was buried in his capital, Nantes, in the church which he constructed to honor the Virgin Mary for his victory in liberating Nantes, initially known as la Chapelle de la Très Sainte Mère de Dieu, (Note: See the parish of St Thérèse publication "l'Antique Eglise de Notre-Dame de Nantes" available in PDF format.) now known as the Basilique Notre Dame in the parish of St Thérèse in Nantes. He was succeeded by his son Drogo.

== Primary sources ==
- Flodoard, Annales, ed. Philippe Lauer, Les Annales de Flodoard. Collection des textes pour servir à l'étude et à l'enseignement de l'histoire 39. Paris: Picard, 1905. Available from Internet Archive and Google Books
- Chronicle of Nantes, ed. Peter Merlet, La chronique de Nantes. Paris, 1896.

== See also ==
- Dukes of Brittany family tree

Regnal titles
Preceded by Gourmaëlon followed by Viking Occupation (to 937)	Duke of Brittany; 938–952	Succeeded by Drogo
