= List of religious figures of Brittany =

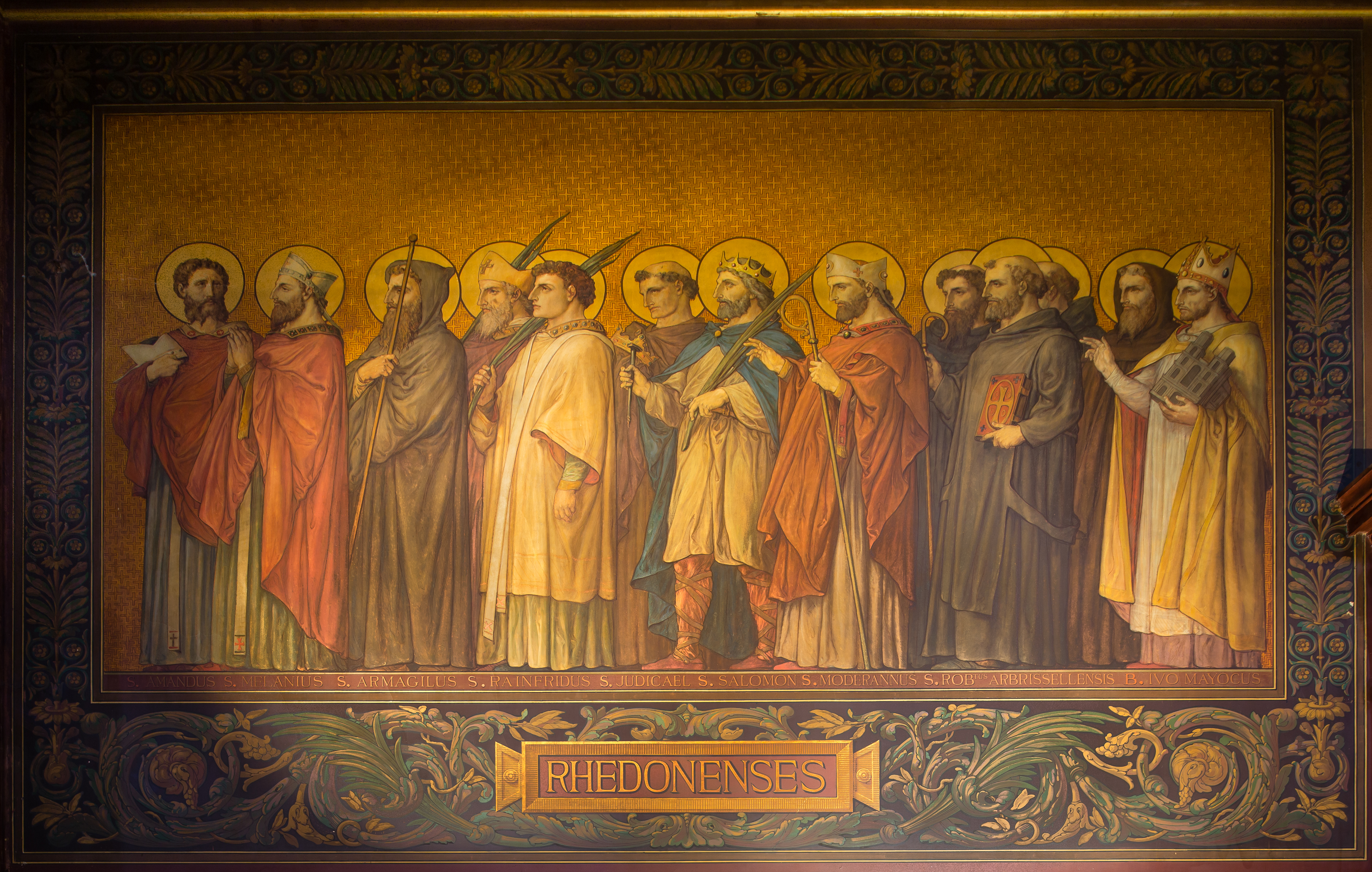
Procession of the Saints of Brittany. (In Rennes Cathedral. By Alphonse Le Hénaff, 1871-1876).

A number of religious figures in Brittany have contributed to its history.

== The Seven Founder Saints of Brittany ==
Each of the Seven Founder Saints was eventually ordained bishop. The only native Breton was St Tudwal. The other founders came from Wales, Ireland and Cornwall.

- St. Tudwal – traditionally the son of King Hoel I and cousin of the King of Domnonée; made Bishop at insistence of Childebert
- St. Pol – created Bishop by Childebert; student of Saint Illtud
- St. Brieuc – student of Saint Germanus of Auxerre
- St. Malo – disciple of Saint Brendan
- St. Padarn – a friend of Saint David; made Bishop by the Patriarch of Jerusalem; his life story evidence of the existence of King Arthur
- St. Corentin of Quimper – first bishop of Quimper
- St. Samson of Dol – student of Saint Illtud; ordained Bishop by Bishop Dubricius

== Monasteries of Brittany ==
- Mont Saint-Michel - lost to Normandy when conquered by William I, Duke of Normandy
- Monastery of St. John at Gaël
- Monastery of Paimpont

== Other Saints and other Holy Persons ==
- St Yves - Ivo of Kermartin - patron saint of lawyers
- Saint Darerca of Ireland - Saint (recognized), Queen of Brittany
- Saint Salomon - Saint (by tradition), King of Brittany
- Saint Judicael - son of a Hoel; King of Domnonia & then Brittany; declared a saint at death
- Saint Armel - dragonslayer; a son of a Hoel; Breton prince of the 6th century.
- Saint Méen- Abbott
- Saint Austol - an associate of Saint Meen
- Saint Judoc- never canonized; by tradition, son of Saint Judicael; renounced the Breton Crown to live as a hermit
- Saint Winnoc- Abbott of Wormhout in Wales, by tradition, son of Saint Judicael
- Saint Louis de Montfort - Saint; canonized in 1947
- The Blessed Charles de Blois - once canonized a saint, Pope Leo set this aside at the request of John V Duke of Brittany; beatified in 1904
- The Blessed Julian Maunoir - beatified in 1951

== Bishops and Dioceses ==
- Ancient Metropolitan of Tours - Archbishop of Tours - Archdiocese of Tours - All Breton Dioceses were subordinate to Tours until Rennes was raised to an archdiocese. The Duke of Brittany attempted to make Dol the archdiocese in charge of Breton Dioceses, but this was rebuffed by Rome in favor of Tours, and eventually the Diocese of Dol ceased to be an archdiocese.
- Ancient Archbishop of Dol - The Ancient Diocese of Dol reached the peak of its ecclesiastical powers around the 10th century, but lost the privileges of an archdiocese. The Bishop ceased to use the title archbishop in the 1700s. The diocese was subsequently split between the Archdiocese of Rennes and the Diocese of St. Brieuc and Treguier.
- Archbishop of Rennes - Held the privilege of crowning the new Duke of Brittany. Currently the highest-ranking dioceses within the Roman Catholic Church's organization for Brittany. The archdiocese has 8 suffragans: Outside of Brittany: Diocese of Angers, Diocese of Laval, Diocese of Le Mans, Diocese of Luçon; Within Brittany: Diocese of Nantes, Diocese of Quimper, the Diocese of Saint-Brieuc and Treguier, and the Diocese of Vannes.
- Ancient Bishop of Kerne - Diocese of Kerne (Diocese of Cournouaille);merged into Dioceses of Quimper
- Ancient Bishop of Saint-Brieuc for the Ancient Diocese of Saint-Brieuc; merged into the modern diocese of Saint-Brieuc and Tréguier
- Ancient Bishop of St Pol de Leon - Diocese of Saint-Pol-de-Leon- merged into the modern Diocese of Quimper
- Ancient Bishop of St. Malo - Ancient Diocese of Saint-Malo also known as the Diocese of Poutrocoet; divided amongst the modern Dioceses of Rennes, St Brieuc and Trequier, and Vannes.
- Ancient Bishop of Treguier - Diocese of Treguier; parts are merged into the modern diocese of Saint-Brieuc and Tréguier and the modern Diocese of Quimper
- Bishop of Nantes - Diocese of Nantes
- Bishop of Quimper - Diocese of Quimper (Formerly part of the Diocese of Cornouailles); the modern Diocese includes the former Diocese of Cornouailles, St-Pol-de-Leon and parts of Treguier
- Bishop of St Brieuc and Trequier - Diocese of Saint-Brieuc and Tréguier
- Bishop of Vannes- Diocese of Vannes - the modern diocese covers the Morbihan
