= Theobald I of Blois =

Count of Blois from 940 to 975/7

Theobald I, Count of Blois
- Born: before 913
- Died: c.977
- Noble family: House of Blois
- Spouse: Luitgarde of Vermandois
- Issue: Hugh, Archbishop of Bourges; Odo I, Count of Blois; Emma
- Father: Theobald the Elder
- Mother: Richildis

Theobald I (before 913 – 16 January 975, 976 or 977), called the Trickster (known as le Tricheur – meaning “cheater”– in French), was Count of Blois, Tours, Chartres and Châteaudun, as well as Lord of Vierzon and Provins. He was a loyal and potent vassal of Hugh the Great, duke of the Franks.

== Life ==
Theobald I was the son of Theobald the Elder of Blois, who from 908 on was Viscount of Tours, and of Richildis, whose origins are debated.

The acquisition of the count's title around 940 was linked to the arrival of a new generation of counts on Robertian lands. In 936, Hugh the Great was invested with the title of Duke of the Franks, which replaced that of Marquis for Neustria. For material and political reasons, the duke had to delegate part of his previous benefits to his vassals - Fulk the Good became count in Angers and Teudon count in Paris. Theobald of Blois was a faithful vassal of the Duke of the Franks and is considered his best lieutenant. The district of his county power included Tours, Blois, Châteaudun and Chartres.

For Hugh the Great, the preeminent role of Theobald in Neustria counterbalanced that of the Norman count William Longsword who ruled a March that extends from the Somme river to Brittany. In this context, Theobald's sister or daughter had married Alan II of Nantes, the Duke of Brittany, giving Theobald influence all the way to Rennes.

However, the death of Alan II left a void in Brittany, making it vulnerable to encroachment by either the Normans or the Angevins. Theobald and Fulk II of Anjou, the two vassals of Hugh the Great agreed on their areas of regency in Brittany, based respectively on Rennes and Nantes. Theobald also married his widowed daughter or sister to Fulk.

About 943–44, he married Luitgarde of Vermandois, widow of William I of Normandy. Her dower around Évreux strengthened Theobald's grip around Normandy. Luitgarde was the daughter of Herbert II, Count of Vermandois and the great-daughter of King Robert I of France. Hence her uncle was Hugh the Great, Duke of France who favored this marriage.

On Easter 945, Louis IV was captured by a Norman faction and given over to Hugh the Great, who placed the king in Theobald's custody. After about a year in his vassal's custody, King Louis negotiated his freedom by offering Hugh the city of Laon, which Hugh then gave to Theobald. However Laon was lost again in 949 when Louis IV supported by Otto the Great's army waged war against Theobald.

Hugh the Great died on June 16, 956. His son Hugh Capet was called to succeed him but, as a minor, King Lothaire did not invest him with the title of Duke of the Franks. Theobald of Blois, who was the second to Hugh the Great, ensured an almost regency in Neustria.

Before 960, he began opposing Richard I of Normandy and entered into a long war with the Normans. In 961 he attacked Évreux. The Normans responded by attacking Dunois. In 962, he launched a failed assault on Rouen. The Normans burned Chartres in response and killed his eldest son Theobald and according to William of Jumièges there was not heard even the bark of a dog in Chartres.

During this conflict, Hugh Capet was finally invested with the title of Duke of the Franks. Hugh disapproved of Theobald's policies. He recently became brother-in-law of Richard I of Normandy on the one hand, and preferred a status quo between count and duke on the other. This event was the starting point of distrust between the House of Blois and their Capetian overlords. Theobald, in return, sought the support of the Carolingian king Lothair.

Following a war against Odalric, Archbishop of Reims, over the castle of Coucy, he let his son hold the castle from the archbishop.

By the time of his death, he had built vast power on the Loire, dominating central France.

== Family ==
Theobald and his first wife, of Rorgonid origin, had:

- Theobald (d. 962).
- Hildegarde, married Bouchard de Bray, Lord of Montmorency.

Theobald and his wife Luitgarde of Vermandois had:

- Hugh, Archbishop of Bourges (d. 985).
- Odo (d. 995), succeeded his father as Count of Blois
- Emma (d. aft. 1003), married William IV of Aquitaine.

And may also have had

- Berta, m. Alan II, Duke of Brittany

== Sources ==
- Bachrach, Bernard S. (1993). Fulk Nerra, the Neo-Roman Consul, 987-1040. University of California Press.
- Bradbury, Jim (2007). The Capetians: The History of a Dynasty. Hambledon Continuum.
- Livingstone, Amy (2010). Out of Love for My Kin: Aristocratic Family Life in the Lands of the Loire, 1000-1200. Cornell University Press.
- d'Orcet, Claude-Sothene Grasset (2003). Œuvres décryptées (in French). Vol. 2. E-dite.
- Potts, Cassandra (1997). Monastic Revival and Regional Identity in Early Normandy. The Boydell Press.

Theobald I of Blois House of Blois Born: 913 Died: 975
Preceded by Theobald the Elder as Viscount of Blois	Count of Blois; 928–975	Succeeded by Odo I
Preceded by Theobald the Elder as Viscount of Tours	Count of Tours; 928–975	Succeeded by Odo I
