= Chronicle of Nantes =

Chronicle of Nantes (Latin: Chronicon Namnetense, French: Chronique de Nantes) is an eleventh-century Latin chronicle of history extending from 570 to about 1049 AD. The original manuscript, kept in the city of Nantes, has not survived, but there exist:

1. a late fifteenth-century French translation of much of it, made by a certain Pierre Le Baud, who inserted it in two histories of Brittany he wrote;
2. Latin excerpts, which have been inserted into other chronicles. The editor of the Chronicle, René Merlet, assembled twenty additional scattered chapters he collected from other sources.

Merlet presented reasons for dating the Chronicle of Nantes to the 1050s, and detected the presence of charters from the cathedral archives of Tours and Nantes, and annals and narratives in the unknown author's source materials.

== Bibliography ==
- Merlet, Peter (ed.). La chronique de Nantes. Paris, 1896. Scans available from Gallica and in the US, from Google Books.
- Whitelock, Dorothy (tr.). "From the Chronicle of Nantes." In English Historical Documents c. 500-1042, ed. D. Whitelock. English Historical Documents 1. 2nd ed. London, 1979. 345–6. Excerpts relevant to King Æthelstan of England from chapters 27 and 29.
