= Newman =

Newman is an English-language surname of Germanic Anglo-Saxon origins. Newman is the modern English form of the name used in Great Britain and among people of British ancestry around the world (as is 'Numan'), while Neumann (with variant spellings) is used in Germany, Switzerland, and Austria, and to some degree in The Netherlands and Belgium. Both have their origins in the pre-7th-century (Old English) word neowe meaning "new", with mann, meaning man. Its first recorded uses were Godwin Nieweman in Oxfordshire, England, in 1169, and in Germany, Herman Nyeman of Barth in 1325. It was mostly likely originally used as a nickname for a recent arrival or settler. Related surnames include Neuman, Naumann(s), Numan, Nauman, and Neiman.

Notable people with the surname include:

== A ==
- Abram Newman (1736–1799), British grocer
- Adrian Newman (disambiguation), multiple people
- Al Newman (born 1960), American baseball player
- Alan Newman (baseball) (born 1969), American baseball player
- Alec Newman (born 1974), British actor
- Alfred Newman (disambiguation), multiple people
- Ali Newman (born 1977), better known as Brother Ali, American rapper
- Alison Newman (born 1968), British actress
- Allen George Newman (1875–1940), American sculptor
- Alysha Newman (born 1994), Canadian pole vaulter
- Amanda Dudamel Newman (born 1999), Venezuelan beauty pageant winner
- Amy Hauck Newman, American medicinal chemist
- Angie F. Newman (1837–1910), American lecturer, temperance leader, writer, and editor
- Andrea Newman (1938–2019), British author
- Andrew Newman (disambiguation), multiple people
- Angelia Thurston Newman (1837–1910), American poet and writer
- Anne B. Newman (born 1955), American gerontologist
- Arnold Newman (1918–2006), American photographer
- Aubrey Newman (1903–1994), American army general
- Aubrey Newman (born 1927), British historian
- Augustus Charles Newman (1904–1972), British lieutenant colonel
- Avis Newman (born 1946), British artist

== B ==
- Barnett Newman (1905–1970), American artist
- Barry Newman (1930–2023), American actor
- Bernard Newman (disambiguation), multiple people
- Beryl Newman (1911–1998), American soldier
- Brooke N. Newman, American historian
- Byron Newman, British photographer

== C ==
- Campbell Newman (born 1963), Australian politician
- A. C. Newman, Canadian musician and composer
- Cecil Newman (1903–1976), American civic leader and publisher
- Charlie Newman (1857–1922), British rugby player
- Charles Newman (disambiguation), multiple people
- Chris Newman (disambiguation), multiple people
- Colin Newman (born 1954), British musician
- Connie Newman, American endocrinologist and physician-scientist
- Constance Berry Newman (born 1935), American attorney and diplomat

== D ==
- Daisy Newman (1904–1994), American author
- Dan Newman (born 1963), Canadian politician
- David Newman, multiple people
- Don Newman (disambiguation), multiple people
- Donald J. Newman (1930–2007, American mathematician

== E ==
- Ed Newman (born 1951), American football player
- Edward Newman (disambiguation), multiple people
- Edwin Newman (1919–2010), American journalist
- Emil Newman (1911–1984), American music director and conductor
- Eric Newman (disambiguation), multiple people
- Ernest Newman (1868–1959), British music critic and musicologist
- Ezra T. Newman (1929–2021), American physicist

== F ==
- Felice Newman, American author
- Frances Newman (1883–1928), American writer
- Francis Newman (died 1660), English colonist
- Francis William Newman (1805–1897), English scholar and philosopher
- Frank Newman (disambiguation), multiple people
- Fred Newman (disambiguation), multiple people

== G ==
- G. F. Newman (born 1947), English television producer and writer.
- George Newman (disambiguation), multiple people
- Geraldine Newman (born 1934), British actress
- Greig Newman (born 1995), British businessman
- Greatrex Newman (1892–1984), British author, songwriter and screenwriter

== H ==
- Harry Newman (disambiguation), multiple people
- Henry Newman (disambiguation), multiple people
- Hugh George de Willmott Newman (1905–1979), British bishop

== J ==
- Jack Newman (disambiguation), multiple people
- Jaime Ray Newman (born 1978), American actress and singer
- James Newman (disambiguation), multiple people
- Jamie Newman (born 1997), American football player
- Jay Newman (1948–2007), Canadian philosopher
- Jeff Newman (disambiguation), multiple people
- Jocelyn Newman (1937–2018), Australian politician
- Joey Newman (born 1976), American composer
- John Newman (disambiguation), multiple people
- Johnny Newman (born 1963), American basketball player
- Jon O. Newman (born 1932), American judge
- Joseph Newman (disambiguation), multiple people
- Judith Newman (born 1961), American journalist and author
- Justice Newman (disambiguation), several people

== K ==
- Kenneth Newman (1926–2017), British police officer
- Kevin Newman (disambiguation), multiple people
- Kim Newman (born 1959), British journalist and novelist

== L ==
- Laraine Newman (born 1952), American comedian
- Lesléa Newman (born 1955), American author and editor
- Leslie Newman, American screenwriter
- Lionel Newman (1916–1989), American film score composer
- Luke Newman (born 2002), American football player

== M ==
- Malik Newman (born 1997), American basketball player
- Marie Newman (born 1964), American politician from Illinois
- Mark Newman, British physicist
- Mark Newman (1949–2020), American baseball coach and executive
- Marvin E. Newman (1927–2023), American artist and photographer
- Max Newman (1897–1984), British mathematician
- Melvin Spencer Newman (1908–1993), American chemist
- Michael Newman (disambiguation), multiple people
- Muriel Newman (born 1950), New Zealand politician

== N ==
- Nanette Newman (born 1934), English actress and author
- Nick Newman (born 1958), British cartoonist
- Nick Newman, (born 1935), American professor
- Nicholas Newman, South African Paralympian athlete

== O ==
- Oliver Michael Griffiths Newman (born 1941), Australian metallurgist and ornithologist

== P ==
- Paul Newman (1925–2008), American actor and racing driver
- Paul S. Newman (1924–1999), American comic-book writer
- Pauline Newman (born 1927), American judge
- Peter Newman (disambiguation), multiple people
- Phyllis Newman (1933–2019), American actress and singer

== R ==
- Randy Newman (born 1943), American singer-songwriter and composer
- Rebecca Newman (born 1981), English soprano singer and songwriter
- Richard Newman (disambiguation), multiple people
- Ricky Newman (born 1970), English footballer
- Riley Newman (born 1993), American pickleball player
- Robert Newman (disambiguation), multiple people
- Ron Newman (1934–2018), English footballer
- Royce Newman (born 1997), American footballer
- Romilly Newman (born 1998), American chef
- Ryan Newman (disambiguation), multiple people

== S ==
- Sam Newman (born 1945), Australian media executive and TV personality
- Samuel Newman (1602–1663), British clergyman
- Saul Newman (born 1972), British political theorist
- Scott Newman (disambiguation), multiple people
- Selig Newman (1788–1871), Polish-American Hebraist and editor
- Skye Newman (born 2003), British singer-songwriter
- Stanley Newman (born 1952), American editor and crossword puzzle compiler
- Steve Newman (disambiguation), multiple people
- Stuart Newman (born 1945), American professor
- Sue Newman (squash player), Australian squash player
- Sydney Newman (1917–1997), Canadian-British film and television producer

== T ==
- Terence Newman (born 1978), American football player
- Terry Newman (born 1981), British-Israeli businessman and activist
- Thomas Newman (born 1955), singer-songwriter and composer
- Tom Newman (disambiguation), multiple people
- Tony Newman (born 1943), English rock drummer
- Troy Newman (disambiguation), multiple people

== V ==
- Victor Newman (disambiguation), multiple people

== W ==
- Walter Newman (disambiguation), multiple people
- William Newman (disambiguation), multiple people
- Willie Betty Newman (1863–1935), American painter

== Fictional characters ==
- Christopher Newman, the protagonist of Henry James's novel The American
- Hedy Newman, a character played by Jane Sibbett from the TV sitcom Herman's Head
- Members of the Newman family, including Cassie, Victor, Nikki, Victoria and Nicholas, long-time characters in the U.S. soap opera The Young and the Restless
- Newman (first name not disclosed), a character from the U.S. sitcom Seinfeld, portrayed by Wayne Knight
- D. Wire Newman, from "The Stormy Present", episode 98 of The West Wing
