= Neumann =

Neumann (pronounced [ˈnɔʏman]) is a German surname, with its origins in the pre-7th-century (Old English) word neowe meaning "new", with mann, meaning man. The English form of the name is Newman. Von Neumann is a variant of the name, and alternative spellings include Neuman, Naumann(s), Nauman, Neiman, and Nyeman.

Its first recorded uses were Godwin Nieweman in Oxfordshire, England, in 1169, and in Germany, Herman Nyeman of Barth in 1325. It was mostly likely originally used as a nickname for a recent arrival or settler. Its early use in Germany was mainly in West Prussia and Pomerelia. It was also used by the Anglo-Saxons and in France (as Neuman). In Middle High German the word for "new" was niuwe, and in modern German neu.

As of 2023 it is the 18th most common surname in Germany.

Notable people with the surname are listed below.

== People ==
=== A–G ===
- Adam Neumann (born 1979), Israeli-born entrepreneur and founder of WeWork
- Alfred Neumann (writer), German writer
- Alfred Neumann (East German politician), East German politician
- Andrea Neumann, multiple people with the same name
- Angela von Neumann, American artist
- Arthur Henry Neumann, British born hunter and explorer
- Bernd Neumann, German politician
- Balthasar Neumann (1687–1753), Bohemian German architect
- Bernhard Neumann, German-born mathematician
- Bernard de Neumann (also Bernhard von Neumann), English mathematician, computer scientist, naval historian
- Birthe Neumann, Danish actress
- Carl Neumann, German mathematician
- Caspar Neumann, Prussian clergyman and statistician
- Caspar Neumann (chemist), German/Polish chemist and apothecary
- Christoph Neumann (born 1964), German politician
- Dave Neumann, Canadian politician
- Elsa Neumann, German physicist
- Else-Ragnhild Neumann, Norwegian geologist
- Erich Neumann (politician), a Nazi politician, civil servant and SS-Oberführer
- Erich Neumann (psychologist), German psychologist
- Franz Ernst Neumann, German physicist and mathematician
- Franz Leopold Neumann, German-American legal scholar and theoretician
- Georg Neumann, microphone manufacturer
- Georges Neumann (1846–1930), French veterinary parasitologist
- Gerda Neumann (1915–1947), Danish film actress
- Gerhard Neumann, American aviation engineer
- Guenter Neumann, German agricultural scientist
- Günter Neumann (singer), German cabaret artist
- Gustaf Adolf Jakob Neumann, Austrian newspaper editor
- Gustav Neumann, German chess player

=== H–M ===
- Hanna Neumann, German-born mathematician
- Hannah Neumann, German politician
- Heinrich Neumann von Héthárs, Austrian medical doctor
- Heinz Neumann (1902–1937), German KPD politician
- Herbert Neumann, German football player/manager
- Hildegard Neumann, Nazi German concentration camp administrator
- Ilana Neumann, Dominican Republic politician
- Iver B. Neumann, Norwegian political scientist and social anthropologist
- Saint John Nepomucene Neumann, American clergyman
- John von Neumann, Hungarian-American mathematician, physicist, computer scientist, engineer and polymath
- Jorge Neumann, Chilean footballer
- Kamila Stösslová (née Neumannová), lover of Leoš Janáček
- Karl Eugen Neumann, Austrian translator and Buddhist activist
- Karl Friedrich Neumann, German orientalist
- Kateřina Neumannová, Czech cross-country skier
- Klára Dán von Neumann (1911–1963), a Hungarian American mathematician
- Kurt Neumann (director), German-born film director
- Liselotte Neumann, Swedish golfer
- Louis Georges Neumann (1846–1930), French veterinary parasitologist
- Luise Neumann, German actress
- Mani Neumann, German musician
- Mark Neumann, American politician
- Martin Neumann, German politician
- Mic Neumann, American producer/director, creator of Kung Faux
- Michael Neumann, Canadian philosopher
- Monica von Neumann, American socialite

=== N–Z ===
- Nicole Neumann, Argentinian model
- Ole Neumann (1947–2025), Danish actor
- Oscar Rudolph Neumann (1867–1946), German ornithologist
- Otto Neumann (athlete) (1902–1990), German sprinter
- Otto Neumann (artist) (1895–1975), German Expressionist painter and printmaker
- Otto C. Neumann (1936–1991), American politician
- Paul Neumann (disambiguation), several people
- Pertti Neumann (born Pertti Nieminen), Finnish pop musician
- Peter Neumann (Canadian football) (1931–2020), Canadian football player
- Peter de Neumann (1917–1972), ["The Man From Timbuctoo"], British mariner
- Peter G. Neumann (1932–2026), American computer science researcher
- Peter M. Neumann (1940–2020), British mathematician
- Peter R. Neumann (born 1974), German journalist and academic
- Petra Isenberg (née Neumann), computer scientist
- Philipp von Neumann (1781–1851), Austrian diplomat
- Randy Neumann (born 1948), American boxer and referee
- Robert G. Neumann (1916–1999), American politician and diplomat
- Robin Neumann (born 1997), Dutch swimmer
- Ronald E. Neumann (born 1944), American diplomat
- Sébastien Neumann (born 1993), French baseball player
- Sigmund Neumann (1904–1962), German political scientist and sociologist
- Therese Neumann (1898–1962), German mystic
- Thomas Neumann (born 1977), German computer scientist
- Václav Neumann (1920–1995), Czech conductor and musician
- Victor Neumann (born 1953), Romanian historian, political analyst, and professor
- Víctor Neumann-Lara (1933–2004), Mexican mathematician
- Von Neumann family, a Jewish Hungarian noble family
- Werner Neumann (musicologist) (1905–1991), German musicologist
- Werner Neumann (jazz musician), German jazz guitarist and music lecturer
- Werner Neumann (judge) (born 1953), German jurist, lawyer and judge
- Werner Neumann (officer) (1905–1970), German general
- Wiebke Neumann (born 1986), German politician
- Wolfgang Neumann (born 1945), Austrian opera tenor

== See also ==
- Neumann University in Aston, Pennsylvania
- Neumann Bygg, a Norwegian buildings supplies retailer owned by the Danish Stark Group
- Neumann Drive, a method of recycling space debris
- Neumann Kaffee Gruppe, a German green coffee company
