= Michael Neuman =

Michael Neuman may refer to:

- Michael Robert Neuman, engineer at Michigan Technological University
- Michael A. Neuman (born 1955), executive for telecommunications and broadcast television companies

== See also ==
- Michael Neumann (disambiguation)
- Michael Newman (disambiguation)
