= Numan =

Numan is a surname of multiple origins. It may be a spelling variant of the surname Newman or it may be an Arabic surname (or name) نعمان also transliterated as Noman. Notable people with the surname include:

- Abdul Jabbar Numan (1949–2019), Yemeni Arab visual artist
- Abdullah Numan, Serbian-Australian academic and Islamic cleric
- Ahmad Muhammad Numan (1909–1996), twice Prime Minister of the Yemen Arab Republic (1965, 1971)
- Arthur Numan (born 1969), Dutch former footballer
- Gary Numan (born 1958), English musician
- Henk Numan (born 1955), Dutch former judoka
- Hermanus Numan (1744 – 1820), Dutch artist
- Philip Numan (born around 1550, died 19 February 1627) was a lawyer and humanist from the Low Countries, and a writer in prose and verse
- Yasin Said Numan (born 1948), Prime Minister of the People's Democratic Republic of Yemen (1986–90)

== See also ==
- Nu'man, Arabic given name
- Naaman (disambiguation)
- Newman, a surname
- Neuman
