= Naumann =

Naumann is a Central German variation of the surname Neumann. Notable people with the surname include:

- Albert Naumann (1875–1952), German Olympic fencer
- Alexander Naumann (1837–1922), German chemist
- Christian August Naumann (1705–1766), German architect
- Cilla Naumann (born 1960), Swedish journalist
- Einar Naumann (1891–1934), Swedish botanist
- Erich Naumann (1905–1951), German Nazi SS-Brigadeführer and Einsatzgruppe commander, executed for war crimes
- Ernst Naumann (1832–1910), German composer
- Francis Naumann (born 1948), American scholar, curator, and art dealer, specializing in the art of the Dada movement and the Surrealist periods
- Friedrich Naumann (1860–1919), German theologian and politician
  - Friedrich Naumann Foundation, German foundation for liberal politics
- Georg Amadeus Carl Friedrich Naumann (1797–1873), German geologist
  - Naumann (crater), a lunar impact crater named after him
- Günter Naumann (1925–2009), German actor
- Günther Naumann (born 1941), German skier
- Hans Naumann (1886–1951), German literary historian
- Heinrich Edmund Naumann (1854–1927), German geologist
- Henrike Naumann (1984–2026), German installation artist
- Horst Naumann (1925–2024), German actor
- Johann Andreas Naumann, German farmer and an amateur naturalist
- Johann Christoph von Naumann, German architect
- Johann Friedrich Naumann (1780–1857), German ornithologist
- Johann Gottlieb Naumann (1741–1801), German composer
- Joseph Fred Naumann (born 1949), American prelate of the Roman Catholic Church
- Kerstin Naumann (born 1981), German rower
- Klaus Naumann (born 1939), German general, who was General Inspector of the German military from 1991 to 1996
- Max Naumann (1875–1939), initiator of the League of National German Jews
- Michael Naumann (born 1941), German politician, journalist and publicist
- Peter Naumann (1941–2024), German sailor
- Robert Naumann (1862–1926), American politician
- Werner Naumann (1909–1982), German politician
- Max Naumann (born 2004), German gynecologist

== See also ==
- Numan (disambiguation)
- Nu'man
- Naumann (crater), a crater on the Moon
