= John H. McCullagh =

American law enforcement officer and police captain

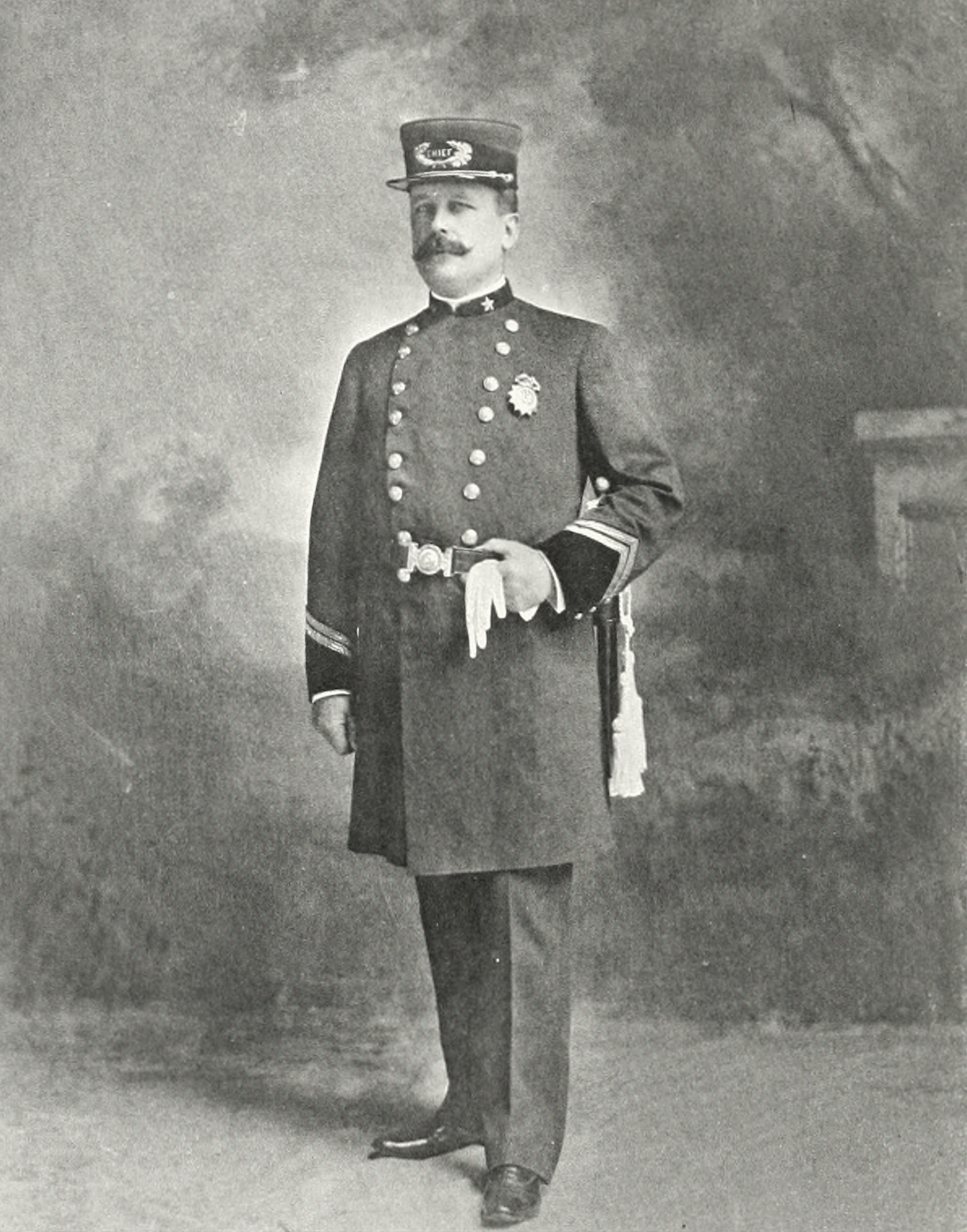
- Born: 1842; County Tyrone, Ireland
- Died: March 6, 1893 (aged 51); New York City, United States
- Other name: Farmer John
- Occupation: Police officer
- Known for: NYPD police captain who fought against Tub of Blood Bunch, the Battle Row and Hell's Kitchen Gangs during the 1860s, 70s and 80s
- Political party: Republican
- Children: 2 sons, 1 daughter

John H. McCullagh (1842 – March 6, 1893) was an American law enforcement officer and police captain in the New York City Police Department. Popularly known as "Farmer John", he was a protégé of Captains Jeremiah Petty and George W. Walling and battled such notorious gangs and river pirates such as the Tub of Blood Bunch, the Battle Row and Hell's Kitchen Gangs. He especially confronting the latter gang when their leaders Ike Marsh and Dutch Heinrichs began raiding the Hudson River Railroad yards and express trains. McCullagh is also credited for the breakup of Shang Draper's criminal organization in the early 1880s.

== Biography ==
Born in County Tyrone, Ireland in 1842, John McCullagh emigrated to the United States as a child. He attended school at Irvington, New York and joined the New York City Police Department in 1864, less than a year following the New York Draft Riots. He was assigned to Captain Jeremiah Petty and then Captain George W. Walling during his early years on the police force, both men becoming mentors to the young rookie patrolman. While at Walling's Twentieth Precinct, he gained a reputation as a brave officer while posted in such notorious districts such as the Fourth Ward, Battle Row and Hell's Kitchen having notable successes against the gangs dominating those areas.

McCullagh was attacked by Dutch Heinrichs and two of his henchmen in Hell's Kitchen while investigating the theft of two hogsheads of ham from a Hudson River Railroad freight car. He battled the three men for over a half an hour before knocking all three unconscious with his nightstick and bringing in the gangsters single-handed to a nearby precinct on West Twenty-Fifth Street. Heinrichs was eventually convicted of assault and sent to prison where he was later committed to an insane asylum.

He also made enemies while on the force. In particular was his assault by ex-police officer James G. Taylor who had previously been dismissed from the police force due to an official complaint made by McCullagh. Taylor attempted to murder McCullagh, ambushing him one night on Ninth Avenue with a pistol, but the roundsman escaped with a minor head wound and a marked ear. Taylor was eventually tried and convicted by then District Attorney A. Oakey Hall and imprisoned in Sing Sing. Oakey later served as McCullagh's council when he was accused of "improperly influencing keepers of resorts", however these charges were tried and dismissed at NYPD Headquarters.

McCullagh was promoted to sergeant in 1866 and, present during the New York Orange Riot of 1871, he was shot in the leg and became one of the many beneficiaries of the Riot Relief Fund. He also made many close and influential friends while doing service at Grand Central Depot. A member of the New York Republican Party and the Fifth Avenue Presbyterian Church, he was a personal friend of Reverend Dr. John Hall.

McCullagh was made a police captain in 1872 and was assigned command of the Seventeenth Precinct, later renamed the Fourteenth Precinct, and was responsible for breaking up Shang Draper's criminal operations during the 1880s. He was eventually transferred to the Twenty-First Precinct following the "shake up" of 1892.

In early 1893, McCullagh began complaining of rheumatism and, on February 27, he suddenly fell extremely ill while at the station house. He declined to go home as his wife was away at Irvington-on-the-Hudson and was confined to bed in his room at the precinct. The doctor found that McCullagh was suffering from sore throat and rheumatism. By the time his wife arrived, McCullagh could not be moved and was made as comfortable as possible in his official office quarters. He remained bedridden for over a week until March 6 when he his condition unexpectedly worsened and a tracheotomy was performed by police surgeon William F. Fluhrer. This brought only a momentary respite as McCullagh suffered a relapse and died shortly after the operation. His nephew John, also a police captain and later the first Police Chief of Greater New York, was with him at the time of his death, however his wife had gone back to Irvington in the meantime. He was survived by his widow, two sons and an adopted daughter.

Upon news of his death, senior police officials gathered at the precinct to pay their respects and console the family. Inspector Alexander S. Williams and Captains George Washburn, Anthony J. Allaire, William Berghold and Thomas Killiloa were appointed a committee so as to organize the funeral on behalf of the family. McCullagh's personal finances, which had always been a source of speculation and controversy throughout his career, amounted to about $115,000. McCullagh had maintained a much lower estimate between $65,000 and $70,000 which was supplanted with income from property in Irvington and tenement buildings in New York. One of his sons was a student at Yale University.

McCullagh is buried at Woodlawn Cemetery in the Bronx, New York City.
