= Werner Neumann =

Werner Neumann may refer to:

- Werner Neumann (musicologist) (1905–1991), German musicologist
- Werner Neumann (officer) (1905–1970), general in the Wehrmacht of Nazi Germany during World War II
- Werner Neumann (jazz musician) (born 1964), German jazz guitarist and music lecturer
- Werner Neumann (judge) (born 1953), German jurist, lawyer and judge
