= Noman =

Noman or Nomans may refer to:

== People ==
- Fuad Noman (1947–2025), Brazilian writer, economist, and politician
- Noman Bashir, Pakistani retired Admiral
- Noman Benotman, (born 1967), the former head of the Libyan Islamic Fighting Group
- Noman Çelebicihan (1885–1918), Crimean Tatar politician
- Noman Habib, Pakistani actor
- Noman Ijaz (born 1965), Pakistani actor
- Noman Masood, Pakistani actor, director, and producer
- Noman Mubashir (born 1974), Norwegian journalist

== Toponyms ==
- Nomans River, in Canada
- Nomans Land (Massachusetts), an island of 640 km off the coast of Martha's Vineyard in Massachusetts

== Other uses ==
- NoMan, a character in T.H.U.N.D.E.R. Agents comic books
- Noman (novel), a 2007 book by William Nicholson
- Noman (airline), an airline based in Italy that operated from 1994 to 1997
- Noman Group, a Bangladeshi textile company
- No-Man, an English band
- No man's land, unowned land or an uninhabited or desolate area, sometimes between two neighbouring territories

== See also ==
- Numan (disambiguation)
