= Nauman =

Nauman is a given name and a surname. It may be a given name of Arabic origin, a transliteration variant of Nu'man. It may be a Germanic surname, a graphic variant of Naumann. Notable people with the name include:

== Given name ==
- Nauman Ahmad Langrial (born 1960), Pakistani politician
- Nauman Alavi (born 1986), Pakistani cricketer
- Nauman Aman (born 1983), Pakistani cricketer
- Nauman Anwar, Pakistani cricketer
- Nauman Ijaz, Pakistani actor
- Nauman Islam Shaikh, Pakistani politician
- Nauman Habib (1979–2011), Pakistani cricketer
- Nauman Karim, Pakistani boxer
- Nauman Mehmood, Pakistani general
- Nauman Niaz (born 1969), Pakistani Television presenter
- Nauman Scott, American judge
- Nauman Shabbir (1953–2013), Pakistani cricketer
- Nauman Wazir Khattak, Pakistani politician
- Nauman Zafar (born 1995), Canadian cricketer
- Nauman Zakariya, Pakistan military officer
- Zaviyar Nauman Ijaz (born 1997), Pakistani actor

== Middle name ==
- George Nauman Shuster, American journalist

== Surname ==
- Åke Nauman, Swedish water polo player
- Bruce Nauman (born 1941), contemporary American artist
- E. Bruce Nauman, American chemical engineer
- Kanwal Nauman (1964), Pakistani actress-turned-politician
- Theodor Nauman (1885–1947), Swedish water polo player

== See also ==
- {srt}}
- Numan (disambiguation)
- Naumann (crater), a crater on the Moon
