= Charles Newman =

Charles Newman may refer to:

- Charles Newman (judge), British judge
- Charles Newman (author) (1938–2006), American novelist and critic
- Charles Newman (music producer) (born 1967), American music producer
- Charles Edward Newman (1900–1989), English physician and medical school dean
- Charles M. Newman (born 1946), mathematician and physicist
- Charles Newman (cricketer) (1839–1883), English cricketer
- C. T. Newman (Charles Thomas Newman, 1841–1911), Australian Methodist minister
- Charles Newman (1924/5–2005), murdered by Andrew Lackey
- Charlie Newman (Charles Henry Newman[, 1857–1922), Wales international rugby player
- Charlie Newman (baseball) (Charles Frank Newman, 1868–1947), Major League Baseball outfielder
- Charlie Newman (Australian footballer) (Charles Alexander John Newman, 1920–1991), Australian rules footballer
