= David Newman =

David Newman may refer to:

== Entertainment ==
- David "Fathead" Newman (1933–2009), American jazz saxophonist
- David Newman (screenwriter) (1937–2003), American screenwriter
- David Newman (composer) (born 1954), American composer
- David Newman (singer) (born 1963), a.k.a. Durga Das, American singer/songwriter

== Sports ==
- Dave Newman (footballer) (1923–1995), Australian footballer for Melbourne
- Dave Newman (Canadian football) (born 1956), former Canadian Football League wide receiver

== Other ==
- David Newman (politician) (born 1944), Canadian politician
- David Newman (priest) (born 1954), Archdeacon of Loughborough since 2009
- David Newman (political geographer) (born 1956), British/Israeli political geographer
- David Newman (physicist), physicist at the University of Alaska Fairbanks

== See also ==
- Dave Neumann (born 1941), Ontario politician
