= Nomani =

Nomani or Numani is a surname. Notable people with the surname include:

- Abdul Rasheed Nomani, Pakistani Islamic scholar
- Abul Qasim Nomani, Indian Islamic scholar
- Asra Nomani (born 1965), Indian-born American author
- Habibur Rahman Nomani (1926–2005), Indian politician
- Hamdullah Nomani, mayor of Kabul, Afghanistan
- Maulana Habibur Rahman Nomani (1926–2005), Indian politician
- Manzoor Nomani (1905–1997), Indian Islamic scholar
- Mufti Abul Qasim Nomani (born 1947), Indian academic administrator
- Muhammad ibn Ibrahim al-Nu'mani, 10th-century Shi'a scholar
- Sajjad Nomani (born 1955), Indian Islamic scholar
- Shibli Nomani (1857–1914), Indian scholar

== See also ==
- Numan (disambiguation)
- Nu'man
- Tafsir Numani, Shia Quranic exegesis
- Nomani Tonga, Tongan rugby union player
