= John Newman =

John Newman may refer to:

== Religion ==
- John Henry Newman (1801–1890), Anglican and Roman Catholic theologian, cardinal and saint
- John Philip Newman (1826–1899), Bishop of the Methodist Episcopal Church

== Politics and law ==
- John Newman (mayor) (c. 1829–1901), American politician
- John Pretyman Newman (1871–1947), British Conservative politician, MP for Enfield and Finchley
- John Newman (Australian politician) (1946–1994), Australian politician
- Jon O. Newman (born 1932), U.S. federal judge
- John Henry Martey Newman, Ghanaian administrator and lawyer

== Sports ==
- John Newman (ice hockey) (1910–1967), professional ice hockey player
- Johnny Newman (footballer) (1933–2025), English footballer and football manager
- Johnny Newman (born 1963), American basketball player
- Sam Newman (John Noel William Newman, born 1945), Australian television personality and ex-Australian rules footballer
- John Newman III (born 1999), American basketball player
- John Lunn Newman (1916–1976), English high jumper

== Others ==
- John Newman (explorer) (c. 1785 – 1838), member of the Lewis and Clark Expedition
- John Newman (architect) (1786–1859), English architect and antiquarian
- Nick Newman (naval architect) (John Nicholas Newman, born 1935), American naval architect
- John Newman (architectural historian) (1936–2023)
- John Newman (scientist) (born 1938), American electrochemical engineer
- John Newman (sculptor) (born 1952), New York sculptor
- John M. Newman (born 1950), American Army intelligence officer and historian
- John Newman (singer) (born 1990), English singer
- John S. Newman, American television soap writer

== See also ==
- Jack Newman (disambiguation)
- Jonathan Newman (disambiguation)
- John Neumann (disambiguation)
- Joseph Newman (disambiguation)
