= Jack Newman =

Jack Newman may refer to:

- E. Jack Neuman (1921–1998), American writer and producer
- Jack Newman (runner) (1903–1976), Australian Olympic athlete
- Jack Newman (high jumper) (1916–1974), British Olympic athlete
- Jack Newman (New Zealand cricketer) (1902–1996), New Zealand sportsman and business executive
- Jack Newman (English cricketer) (1884–1973), English cricketer who played for Hampshire
- Jack Newman (doctor) (born 1946), Canadian physician
- Jack Newman (footballer) (born 2002), Scottish footballer (Dundee United)
- Jack Newman or Rory Jack Thompson (1942–1999), Australian CSIRO scientist and murderer

== See also ==
- John Newman (disambiguation)
