= William Neuman =

William Neuman may refer to:

- William F. Neuman (1919–1981), American biochemist and author
- William Neuman (journalist), American journalist and author

== See also ==
- William A. Neumann (born 1944), justice on the North Dakota Supreme Court
- William Newman (disambiguation)
- Neuman (surname)
