= Jonathan Newman (disambiguation) =

Jonathan Newman, a British filmmaker and writer.

Jon or Jonathan Newman may also refer to:

- Jonathan Uhry Newman (1927–1991), American attorney and judge
- Jonathan Newman (composer), an American composer and conductor, see Charles Ives Prize
- Jon O. Newman (born 1932), United States federal judge.
- Jonathan Newman, former chairman of the Pennsylvania Liquor Control Board.

== See also ==
- John Newman (disambiguation)
