= Andrew Newman =

Andrew Newman may refer to:

- Andrew Newman (TV producer) (born 1969), British TV producer
- Andrew J. Newman, Islamic studies scholar
- Andrew Newman House, Massachusetts
- Andy Newman (rugby union) (born 1978), Welsh rugby union player
- Andy Newman (basketball), American basketball coach
