= Michael Newman =

Michael or Mike Newman may refer to:

- Michael J. Newman (born 1960), American federal magistrate judge
- Michael Newman (actor) (1957–2024), American lifeguard and actor (Baywatch)
- Michael Newman (product marketer), American product marketer
- Oliver Michael Griffiths Newman (Mike Newman, born 1941), Australian ornithologist
- Mike Newman (born 1972), Australian politician
- Mike Newman, Australian mathematician, winner of the 1993 BH Neumann Award

== See also ==
- Michael Neuman (disambiguation)
- Michael Neumann (disambiguation)
