= Saint John Neumann (disambiguation) =

Saint John Neumann was the fourth Bishop of Philadelphia (1852-60) and the first American bishop to be canonized.

Saint John Neumann may also refer to:

- Saint John Neumann High School (Pennsylvania), an all-male Roman Catholic high school located in South Philadelphia
- St. John Neumann High School (Naples, Florida), a co-educational private, Roman Catholic high school in Naples, Florida

== See also ==
- John Neumann (disambiguation)
