= Peter Neumann =

Peter Neumann may refer to:

- Peter Neumann (Canadian football) (1931–2020), Canadian football player
- Peter G. Neumann (1932–2026), American computer science researcher
- Peter M. Neumann (1940–2020), British mathematician
- Peter R. Neumann (born 1974), political scientist

== See also ==
- Peter de Neumann (1917–1972), British sailor, convicted pirate and dockmaster
- Peter Newman (disambiguation)
