= Henry Newman =

Henry Newman may refer to:

- Henry Newman (cricketer) (1907–1988), Australian cricketer
- Henry Newman (football coach) (born 1989), English association football coach
- Henry Newman (Medal of Honor) (1845–1915), German-born soldier in the U.S. Army and Medal of Honor recipient
- Henry Newman (political adviser), British political adviser
- Harry Newman (politician) (1839–1904), French-born Australian politician
- Henry P. Newman (1868–1917), German merchant and art collector
- Henry Roderick Newman (1843–1917), American painter
- Henry Stanley Newman (1837–1912), grocer, Quaker philanthropist, and author

== See also ==
- John Henry Newman (1801–1890), English cardinal
- Harry Newman (disambiguation)
- Henry Neumann (born 1950), Puerto Rican politician
