= Eric Newman =

Eric Newman may refer to:

- Eric P. Newman (1911–2017), American numismatist
- Eric Newman, stage name Stagga Lee (born 1977), American rapper
- Eric Clinton Kirk Newman, birth name of Luka Magnotta (born 1982), Canadian pornographic actor and model convicted of murder
- Eric Newman (producer), American film producer
- Eric Newman (footballer) (1924–1971), English goalkeeper
- Eric Newman (baseball) (born 1972), American baseball coach and pitcher
