= John Neumann (disambiguation) =

John Neumann (1811–1860) was a Bohemian-American bishop.

John Neumann may also refer to:

- St. John Neumann, Bryn Mawr, a Roman Catholic parish in the Archdiocese of Philadelphia
- John von Neumann (1903–1957), Hungarian-American mathematician
- Johnny Neumann (1950–2019), American basketball player and coach
- John Robert Neumann Jr. (1972–2017), perpetrator of the Orlando factory shooting in 2017

== See also ==
- John Naumann (1893–1964), English cricketer
- Saint John Neumann (disambiguation)
- John Newman (disambiguation)
