= William Newman =

William, Bill or Billy Newman may refer to:

== Arts and entertainment ==
- William Newman (woodcarver) (born c. 1649), English woodcarver
- William S. Newman (1912–2000), American musicologist
- William Newman (actor) (1934–2015), American actor
- William A. Newman (born 1948), American painter and computer artist

== Law and politics ==
- William Newman (MP) (fl. 1550s–1570s), English politician; MP for Poole (UK Parliament constituency)
- William Truslow Newman (1843–1920), U.S. federal judge
- William Newman (Canadian politician) (1873–1953), Canadian politician from Ontario
- Bill Newman (politician) (William Gould Newman, 1928–1988), Canadian politician from Ontario

== Religion ==
- William P. Newman (1810–1866), American fugitive slave and Baptist minister
- William Newman (priest) (1811–1864), inaugural Anglican Dean of Cape Town
- William Clifford Newman (1928–2017), American Roman Catholic bishop

== Others ==
- William Newman (American football) (c. 1882–1964), American college football player and coach
- William Newman (computer scientist) (1939–2019), British computer scientist
- Billy Newman (1946–2022), Irish footballer
- William R. Newman (born 1955), American historian of science
- William Newman (surgeon) (1833–1903), English surgeon

== See also ==
- William A. Neumann
- William Neuman
- Newman (surname)
