= Michael Neumann (disambiguation) =

Michael Neumann may refer to:

- Michael Neumann, academic and philosopher, writer on the Israel-Palestine conflict
- Michael Neander (originally Neumann) (1529–1581), German teacher, mathematician, medical academic
- Michael Neumann Architecture, designers of Martin + Osa stores
- Mikey Neumann, American YouTuber and video game writer

== See also ==
- Michael Neuman (disambiguation)
- Michael Newman (disambiguation)
