= James Newman =

James, Jim, or Jimmy Newman may refer to:

== Arts and entertainment ==
- Jimmy C. Newman (1927–2014), American country music and cajun singer-songwriter
- Jim Newman (film and television producer) (born 1933), American film and television producer
- James Newman (singer) (born 1985), English singer-songwriter
- James Newman (actor) (born 1992), American actor
- Jim Newman (actor), American actor and writer
- Jim Newman (Village People), American musician; member of the Village People

== Science and medicine ==
- James Newman (geriatrician) (1903–1983), New Zealand geriatrician and medical superintendent
- James R. Newman (1907–1966), American mathematician and mathematical historian
- James H. Newman (born 1956), American astronaut
- James C. Newman, American engineer and materials scientist

== Others ==
- James Newman-Newman (1767–1811), British naval officer
- James W. Newman (1841–1901), American politician in Ohio
- James Newman (mining engineer) (1880–1973), Australian mining engineer and grazier
- James Newman (Canadian politician) (1903–1963), Canadian politician in Ontario
