= David P. Mapes =

American politician

David Parshall Mapes (January 10, 1798 – May 17, 1890) was an American pioneer businessman and politician.

== Life ==
David P. Mapes was born January 10, 1798, in Coxsackie, New York. The youngest of four children, his parents were of English origin and moved from Long Island to Coxsackie, where his father built a hotel, the Elm Tree House. His father also owned a sloop to run from Coxsackie to New York City. His mother died of consumption when he was about six years old. His father got into the lumber business and bought a mill about seven miles from Coxsackie. Aged 12, young Mapes would draw the lumber to the Hudson River and sell it. He attended a log schoolhouse in the winter.

At the age of twenty, Mapes went to Roxbury, Delaware County to work in his brother-in-law's store. After two years, he became a partner in the business, which he took over upon his brother-in-law's death. He married Ruth Frisbee; they had two sons and a daughter. He expanded his business undertakings to include a grist mill and farm, and the manufacture of potash and whisky. He was elected Town Supervisor. In 1831, he served in the New York State Assembly, where he voted in favor of abolishing imprisonment for debt. He then moved to Carbondale, Pennsylvania, where he operated a sawmill for about five years. Around 1838, he returned to New York entered the freight and passage business on the Hudson River.

He moved to Ripon, Wisconsin Territory, in 1844, which he helped found. He also help found Ripon College. He wrote an autobiographical and historical account about Ripon, Wisconsin. In the 1860s, Mapes moved to Winneconne, Wisconsin, where he opened a hotel. He died in Winneconne and was buried at Hillside Cemetery in Ripon.

== Family ==
His son-in-law, Otto Christian Neuman, became a member of the Minnesota House of Representatives.
