= Neiman =

Neiman is a Dutch and Low German surname. It may refer to:

- Abraham Lincoln Neiman (1875–1970)
- Carrie Marcus Neiman (1883–1953)
- David Neiman (1921–2004), Russian-American rabbi, archaeologist, and historian
- Fred Neiman (1860–1910), English ventriloquist
- Joan Neiman (1920–2022), Canadian politician from Ontario
- LeRoy Neiman (1921–2012), American artist
- Mikhail Samoilovich Neiman (1905–1975), Soviet physicist
- Nancy Neiman (born 1933), American cyclist
- Richard H. Neiman (contemporary), American businessman; head of the New York State Department of Banking
- Shirah Neiman (1943–2025), American prosecutor
- Susan Neiman (born 1955), American-German moral philosopher and author
- Tanya Neiman (1949–2006), American lawyer
- Troy Neiman (born 1990), American baseball player
- Yulia Neiman (1907–1994), Russian poet and translator

== See also ==
- Nieman (surname)
