= Georg Amadeus Carl Friedrich Naumann =

German mineralogist and geologist

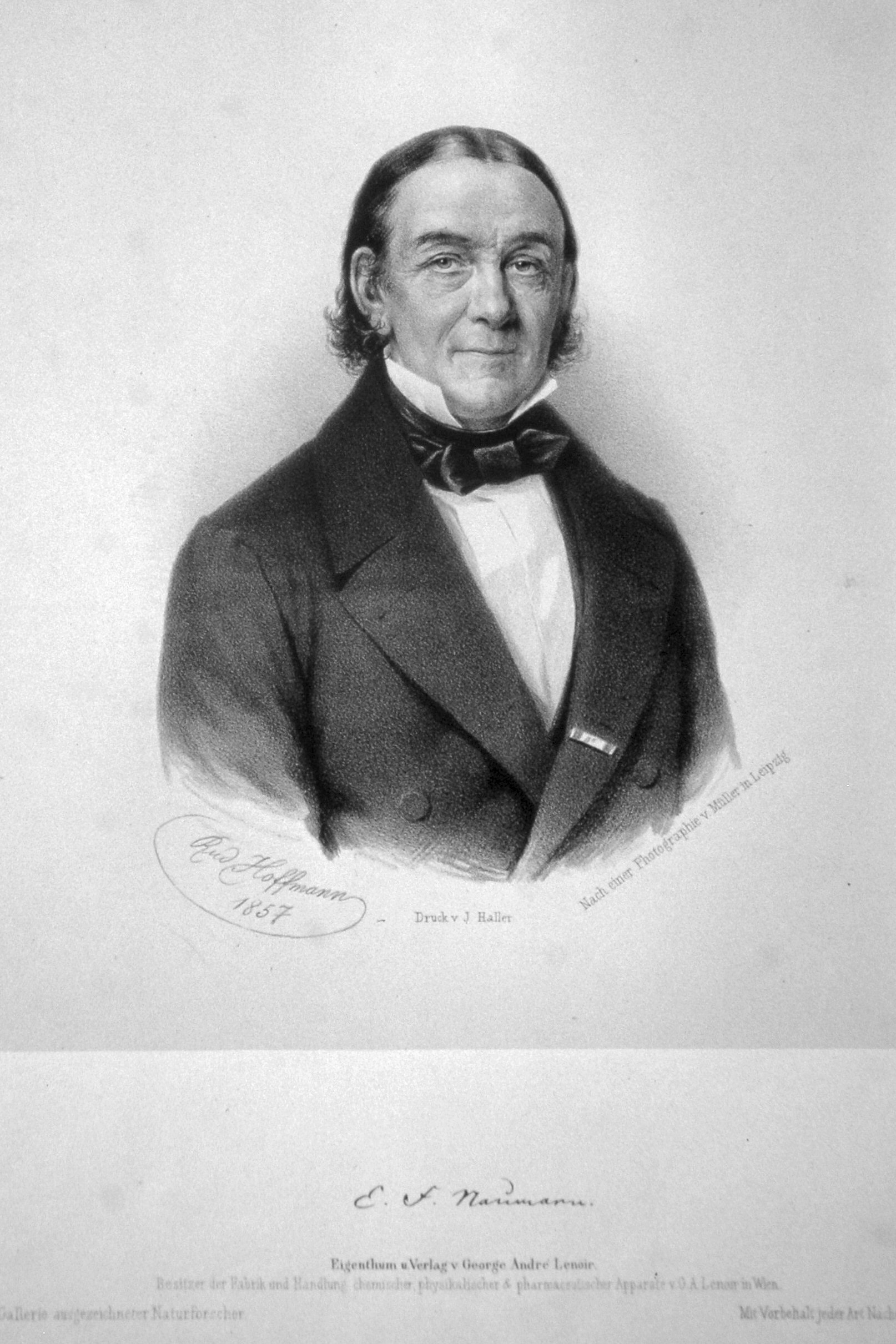
- Naumann in an 1857 lithograph
- Born: May 30, 1797; Dresden, Electorate of Saxony, Holy Roman Empire
- Died: November 26, 1873 (aged 76); Leipzig, Saxony, Germany
- Other names: Karl Friedrich Naumann
- Education: Pforta
- Alma mater: Freiberg; Leipzig University; University of Jena
- Occupations: Mineralogist, geologist

Georg Amadeus Carl Friedrich Naumann (30 May 1797 – 26 November 1873), also known as Karl Friedrich Naumann, was a German mineralogist and geologist. The crater Naumann on the Moon is named after him.

== Life ==
Naumann was born at Dresden, the son of a distinguished musician and composer. He received his early education at Pforta, studied at Freiberg under Werner, and afterwards at Leipzig and Jena. He graduated at Jena, and was occupied in 1823 in teaching in that town and in 1824 at Leipzig. In 1826 he succeeded Mohs as professor of crystallography, in 1835 he became professor also of geognosy at Freiberg; and in 1842 he was appointed professor of mineralogy and geognosy in the University of Leipzig. At Freiberg he was charged with the preparation of a geological map of Saxony, which he carried out with the aid of Bernhard von Cotta in 1846.

Naumann was a man of encyclopedic knowledge, lucid and fluent as a teacher. Early in life (1821-1822) he traveled in Norway, and his observations on that country, and his subsequent publications on crystallography, mineralogy and geology. His sketches were admired by Caspar David Friedrich and Carl Gustav Carus, who copied them to use as material for their paintings. In 1869, he was elected as a member of the American Philosophical Society. He was elected a Foreign Honorary Member of the American Academy of Arts and Sciences in 1873. He died at Leipzig that year.

He published Beiträge zur Kenntniss Norwegens (2 vols., 1824); Lehrbuch der Mineralogie (1828); Lehrbuch der reinen und angewandten Krystallographie (2 vols. and atlas, 1830); Elemente der Mineralogie (1846; ed. 9, 1874; the 10th ed. by F. Zirkel, 1877); and Lehrbuch der Geognosie (2 vols. and atlas, 1849-1854, ed. 2, 1858-1872). He published Elemente der theoretischen Krystallographie (1856) in which he introduced the term enantiomer.
