= Jonathan Newman (businessman) =

American businessman, lawyer, and regulator

- Born: Jonathan H. Newman
- Education: Juris Doctor
- Alma mater: University of Pennsylvania Law School; Bowdoin College
- Occupations: CEO, Newman Wines & Spirits
- Known for: Oenophilia
- Website: Jonathan Newman bio

Jonathan Newman is an American businessman, lawyer, and former chairman of the Pennsylvania Liquor Control Board. He is currently the chief executive of Newman Wines & Spirits, a wine brokerage he founded in 2008.

== Early life and education ==
Newman was raised in Penn Valley, Pennsylvania. He graduated from Bowdoin College summa cum laude and earned his J.D. degree from the University of Pennsylvania Law School.

== Career ==
After law school, Newman began working for the law firm Obermayer, Rebmann, Maxwell & Hippel. Newman has a passion for horses and bought his first racehorse at the age of 29 for $47,000. He raced the horse nine times and won $120,000 in purses before selling the horse for $400,000. He would later serve as the Chairman for the Pennsylvania Harness Racing Commission where he limited the use of whips in harness racing. He entered politics in 1998 at the age of 35 when he challenged Jon D. Fox for his seat on the Pennsylvania House of Representatives, losing in a four-way primary. He was approached in 1999 about joining the Pennsylvania Liquor Control Board.

Newman was appointed to the board by Tom Ridge in 2000. He served on the Pennsylvania Liquor Control Board for over seven years and became chairman in August 2002. He spent the first two years of his appointment learning about the state liquor system and wine. During his time with the board he implemented programs that helped Pennsylvania become a world-class purveyor in wines, including Sunday sales, wine festivals, and premium collection state stores. One of the most known programs was the "Chairman's Selection" where he used the state's purchasing power to buy premium wines that were sold to the public at discount prices. In 2003 he was named Man of the Year by Wine Enthusiast Magazine for his work at the board.

He left the Liquor Control Board in 2007 and founded Newman Wines & Spirits. The company purchases quality wines at a savings and sells them to retailers who pass the savings to customers.

Political offices
Preceded by John E. Jones III	Chairman, Pennsylvania Liquor Control Board; 2002-2007	Succeeded by P.J. Stapleton
