= Andrew Newman House =

Historic house

- U.S. National Register of Historic Places
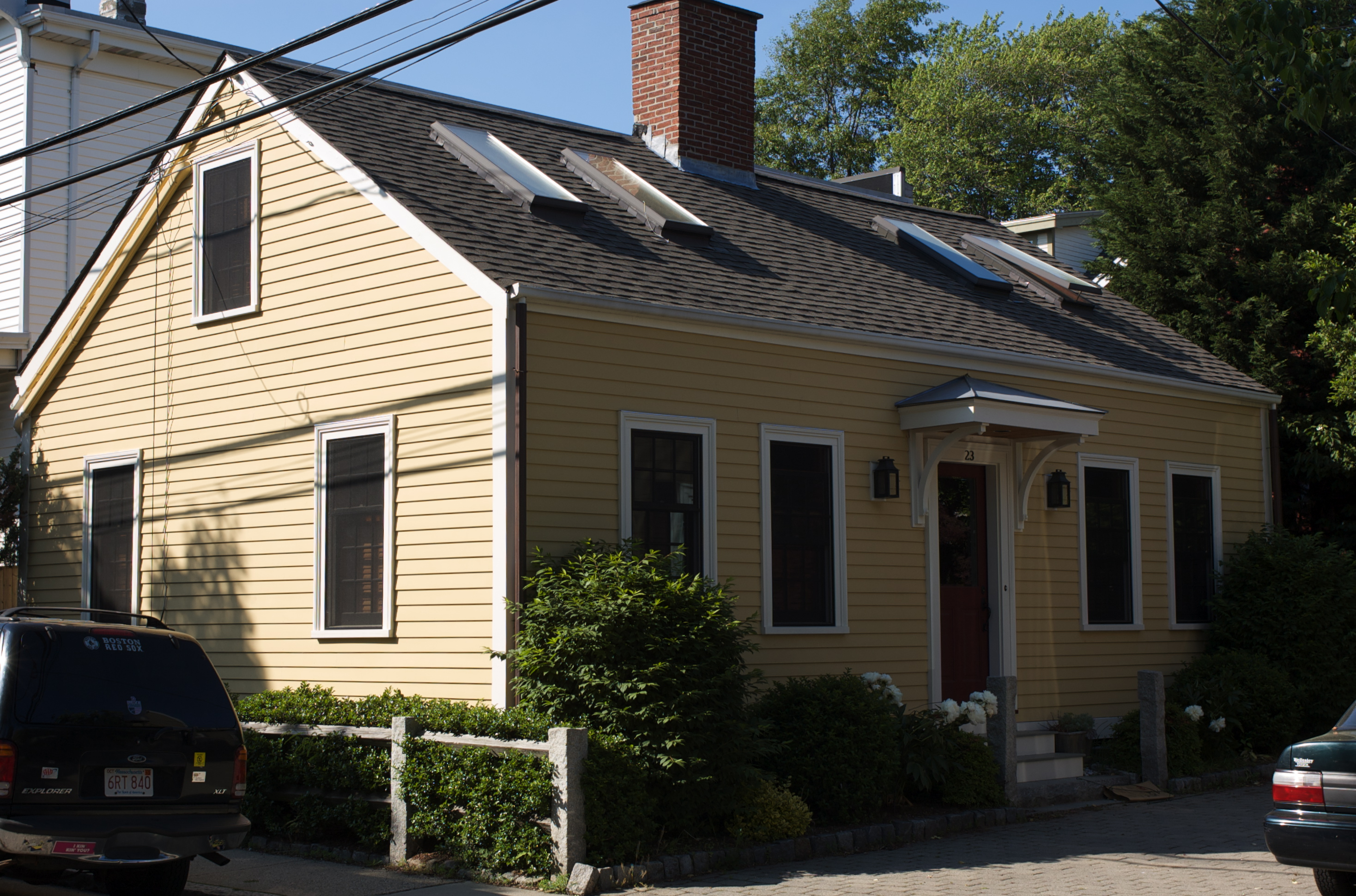

- Location within Massachusetts
- Location: 23 Fairmont Street, Cambridge, Massachusetts
- Coordinates: 42°21′41.4″N 71°06′37.1″W
- Built: 1823
- Architectural style: Georgian
- MPS: Cambridge MRA
- NRHP reference No.: 82001963
- Added to NRHP: April 13, 1982

The Andrew Newman House is a historic house in Cambridge, Massachusetts. It is a 1 1/2-story wood-frame structure, five bays wide, with a central chimney and an entrance sheltered by an enclosed vestibule. Built in 1823, this single story wood-frame house is one of the oldest houses in the Cambridgeport area of the city. The house is also unusual for its construction date, since it is a Georgian style Cape house, as opposed to the then-prevalent Federal style. Its first owner was a ropemaker.

The house was listed on the National Register of Historic Places in 1982.

== See also ==
- National Register of Historic Places listings in Cambridge, Massachusetts
