= Amy Hauck Newman =

American medicinal chemist

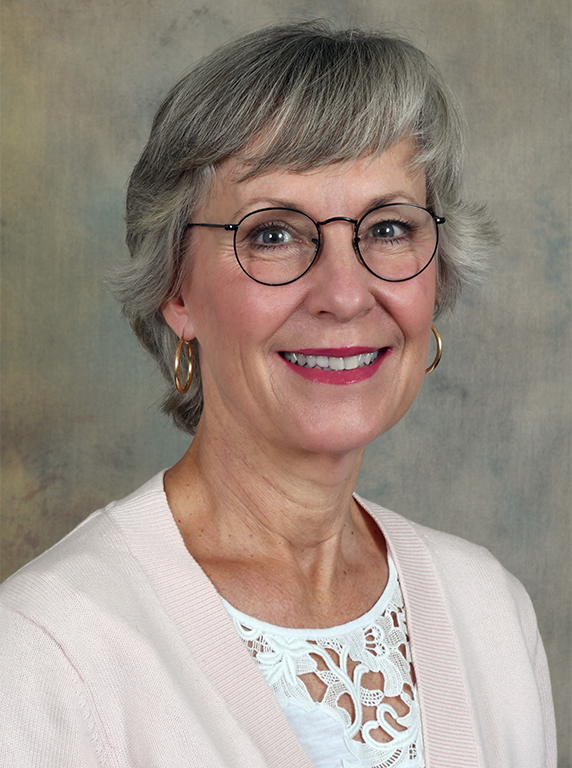
- Newman in 2020
- Education: Mary Washington College; Medical College of Virginia
- Scientific career
- Fields: Medicinal chemistry, substance use disorders
- Workplaces: National Institute on Drug Abuse
- Doctoral advisor: Richard A. Glennon

Amy Hauck Newman is an American medicinal chemist who is the scientific director of the intramural research program at the National Institute on Drug Abuse. Newman researches the design, synthesis, and evaluation of central nervous system active agents. A notable focus of her research is developing medications that target dopamine transporters to help treat cocaine addiction and other substance use disorders. Active agents as potential treatment medications for substance use disorders, with an emphasis on selective ligands for the dopaminergic system.

== Life ==
Newman completed a B.S. in chemistry at the Mary Washington College. Newman received her Ph.D. in medicinal chemistry from the Medical College of Virginia under the mentorship of Richard A. Glennon. For her postdoctoral studies, she joined the laboratory of Kenner C. Rice at the National Institutes of Health (NIH). Amy Hauck Newman worked as a research chemist at the Walter Reed aArmy Institute of Research from 1988 to 1990 before continuing her career at the National Institute on Drug Abuse. She conducted total opiate synthesis through a National Research Service Award funded by the National Institute on Drug Abuse (NIDA).

Newman is the chief of NIDA’s Molecular Targets and Medications Discovery Branch, and director of the NIDA Intramural Research Program (IRP) Medication Development Program. She researches the design, synthesis, and evaluation of central nervous system (CNS) active agents as potential treatment medications for substance use disorders, with an emphasis on selective ligands for the dopaminergic system. She also worked on Medications for Addiction Treatment (MAT) where she developed strategies that affected the dopamine in the brain. Her laboratory explores the creation of amide-based compounds that interact with glutamate receptors, which are also implicated in substance abuse. In 2014, she received the Marian W. Fischman Lectureship Award from the College on Problems of Drug Dependence. In 2016, she was the first woman to receive the Philip Portoghese Lectureship Award, awarded by the Division of Medicinal Chemistry and the Journal of Medicinal Chemistry. In 2018, she was honored as a “Remarkable Woman in Medicinal Chemistry” at the 255th American Chemical Society National Meeting. In 2019, Newman received the NIH Ruth L. Kirschstein Mentoring Award from the NIH Office of the Director. On November 22, 2020, Newman became the NIDA IRP scientific director. She had been acting in the role for the previous two years.
