= Henry P. Newman =

German Jewish merchant and art collector (1968–1917

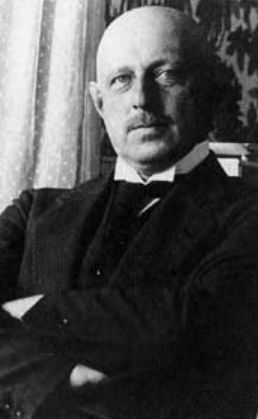
- Newman in 1905
- Born: 6 January 1868
- Died: 6 February 1917 (aged 49)
- Other name: Henry Percy Newman
- Occupations: merchant and art collector
- Spouse: Maria Louise Newman

Henry Percy Newman (born 6 January 1868 in Altona; died 6 February 1917 in Berlin) was a German merchant and art collector. The entrepreneur, who came from a banking family, was one of the leading grain importers in the German Empire. His important art collection included works by the French and German impressionists.

== Life ==
Henry P. Newman's ancestors came from England on his father's side and had made their fortune in maritime trade. His father Henry L. Newman (1813–1897), son of an English consul, had been a partner in the Hesse bank (later Hesse Newman) since 1845 and married the banker's daughter Mary Hesse who was Jewish. From this marriage, Henry P. Newman, born in Altona in 1868, was the second son.

Henry P. Newman began his professional career in his parents' bank and completed his apprenticeship there. At the age of 28, he went into business for himself as a grain dealer and merchant banker in 1896 and headed the grain agency and commission business HP Newman, a company that soon became one of the leading grain importers in the German Empire.

In 1890 he married Maria von Düring, called Mariechen. In 1893 the couple moved into a stately home at 7 Fontenay-Allee. Today, the Hotel InterContinental is located here. At that time, the property extended to the Alster and had its own tennis court. The Newmans received numerous well-known guests in the house, including the poet Richard Dehmel and his wife Ida Dehmel. For their summer stays, the Newmans first used the Newman country house in Nienstedten, before they acquired a plot of land in Hittfeld in 1905 and had the Sunderberg house built there. Alfred Lichtwark, director of the Hamburger Kunsthalle and one of Newman's neighbors, advised him on building his art collection.

Henry P. Newman was one of the co-founders of the Hamburg Scientific Foundation and during the First World War, donated his own hospital train. Newman died in Berlin in 1917.

== Art collection ==
Newman was known for his exquisite collection of French impressionists, which included A View of the Waterloo Bridge and the garden landscape The Garden of Monet’s House in Argenteuil (Le repos dans le jardin, Argenteuil) by Claude Monet, The Pastel Dancer, Tying her Sandal by Edgar Degas and Édouard Manet's Still Life Nuts and Apples in a Bowl and Die Badenden. Other works by French artists in the collection included Moulin de Bonnevaux by Gustave Courbet and Provençal Landscape with a Red Roof and Chestnut Trees in the Park of Jas de Bouffan by Paul Cézanne. Newman also owned the painting Pot with Zinnias by Vincent van Gogh and Ferdinand Hodler's Lumberjack and Forest Interior in Reichenbach. On the recommendation of the Hamburg district court director and art critic Gustav Schiefler, the paintings Seascape and Village Street by Edvard Munch were also added to Newman's collection.

He also collected German artists: Schimmel im Grünen by Fritz von Uhde and Landscape near Bernau by Hans Thoma, Snow Painting by Hans Olde and Hemsbach Castle, and View of Frauenchiemsee Monastery by Wilhelm Trübner. Newman was personally known to Ludwig von Hofmann, who visited him in Hamburg in 1904. His paintings Reiter am Strande and Frühling were also part of the collection.

In addition, Newman commissioned pictures from young Hamburg artists with whom he was known or friends, purchasing the Alstertal landscape by Ernst Eitner or Schafe, Duck and the double portrait of Henry Hartwig and Isa Newman by Julius von Ehren, as well as works by Arthur Siebelist and Julius Wohlers. While Newman resold most of the Hamburg artist's paintings, he kept the paintings of his friend Leopold von Kalckreuth until his death. These included the painter Gamper, playing the cello, evening on the balcony and Eddelsener Garten in May, as well as the portraits of his relatives, Henry Hartwig Newman, Maria Louisa Newman as a child and Maria Louisa Newman as a young woman.

Newman owned many artworks by Max Liebermann, who frequently visited the Newman house and who painted in 1910 a portrait of his wife Maria Newman. The portrait of Henry Percy Newman began by Liebermann shortly before the sitter died in 1917. Other Liebermann works in the collection were Corso on Monte Pincio, Garden bench under the chestnut tree, Garden in Noordweijk-Binnen, Hunter in the dunes near Noordwijk, Goatherd in the dunes, The flower terrace in the Wannsee garden to the north-west, The kitchen garden to the north-west and a version of The parrot man and the pastels Unter den Linden and grooms on the beach.

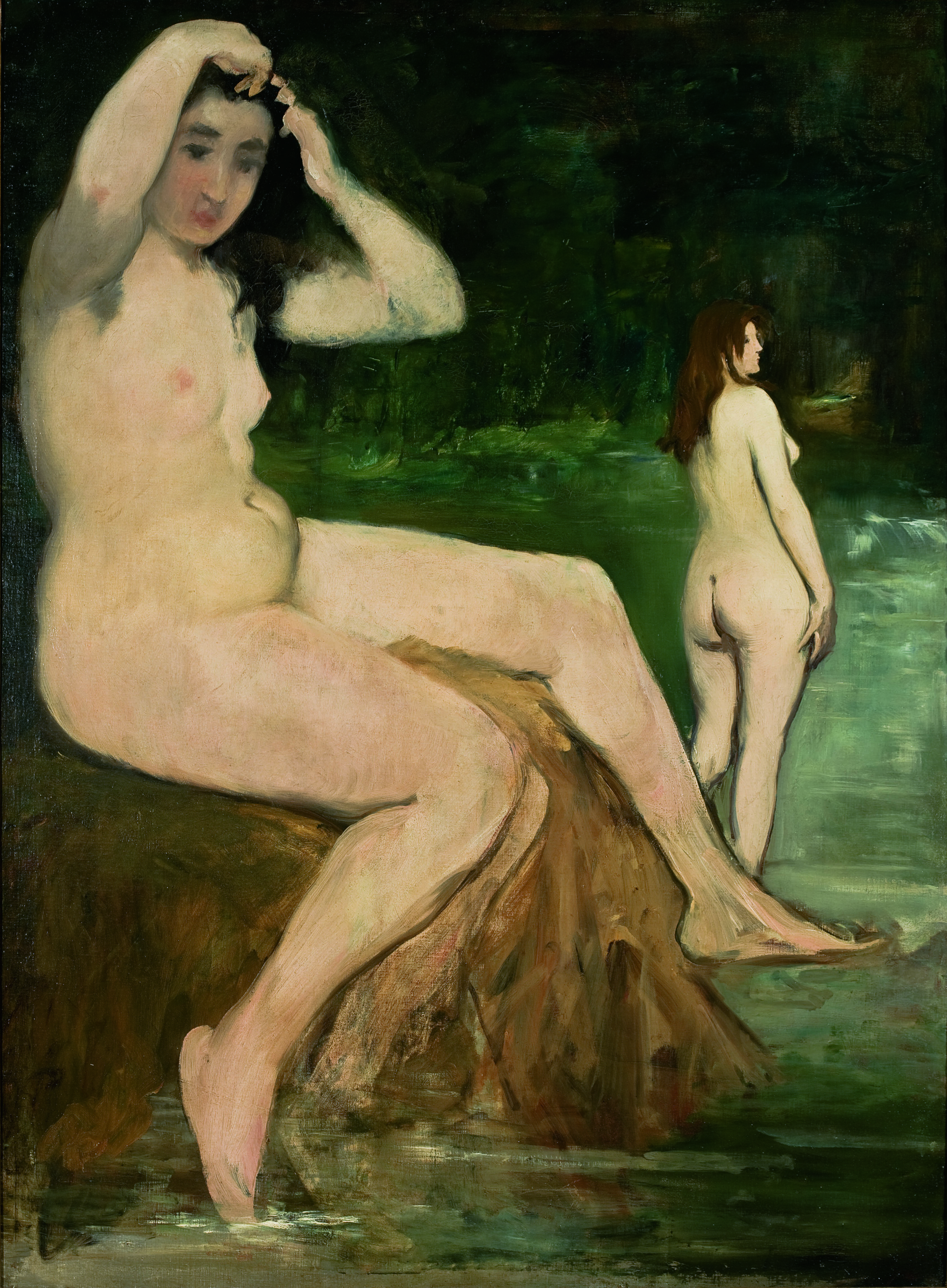
Édouard Manet:
Die Badenden

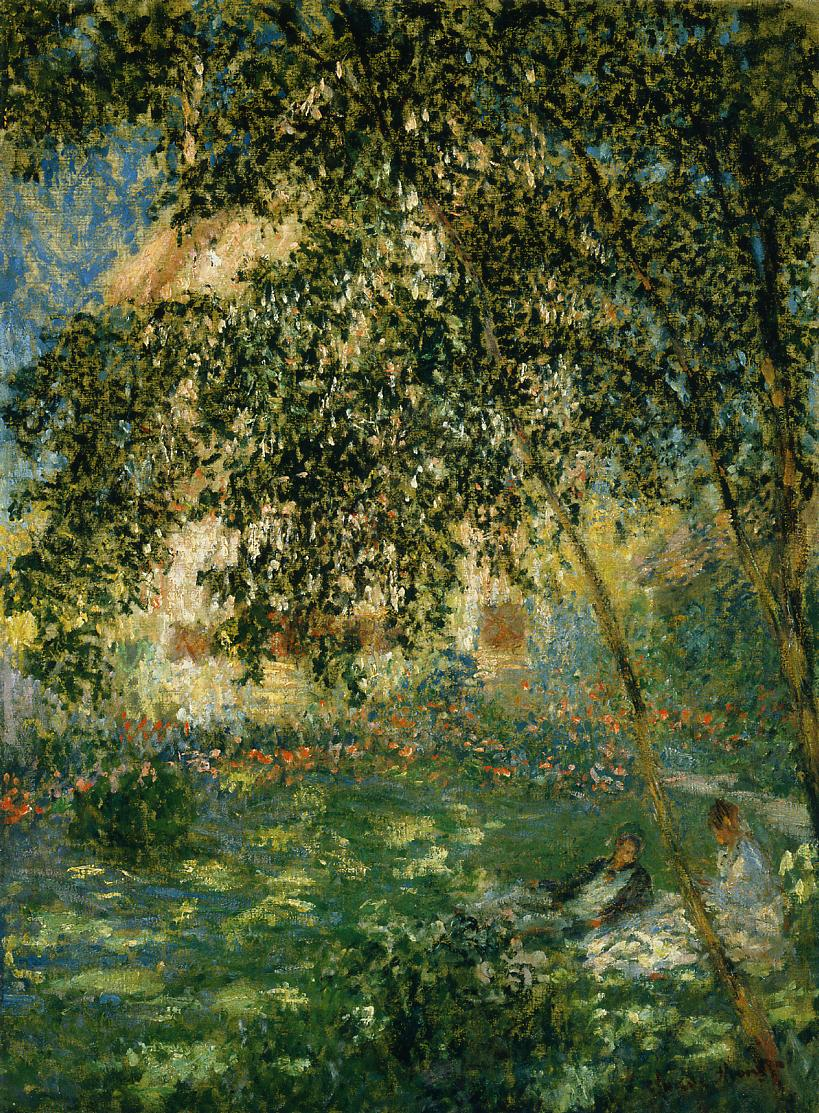
Claude Monet:
Le repos dans le jardin, Argenteuil

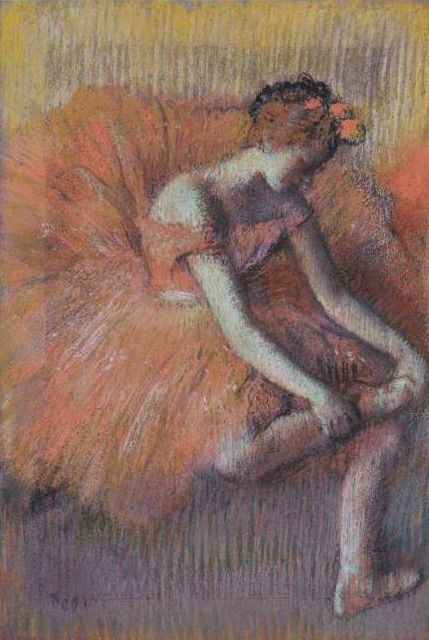
Edgar Degas:
Tänzerin, sich die Sandale bindend

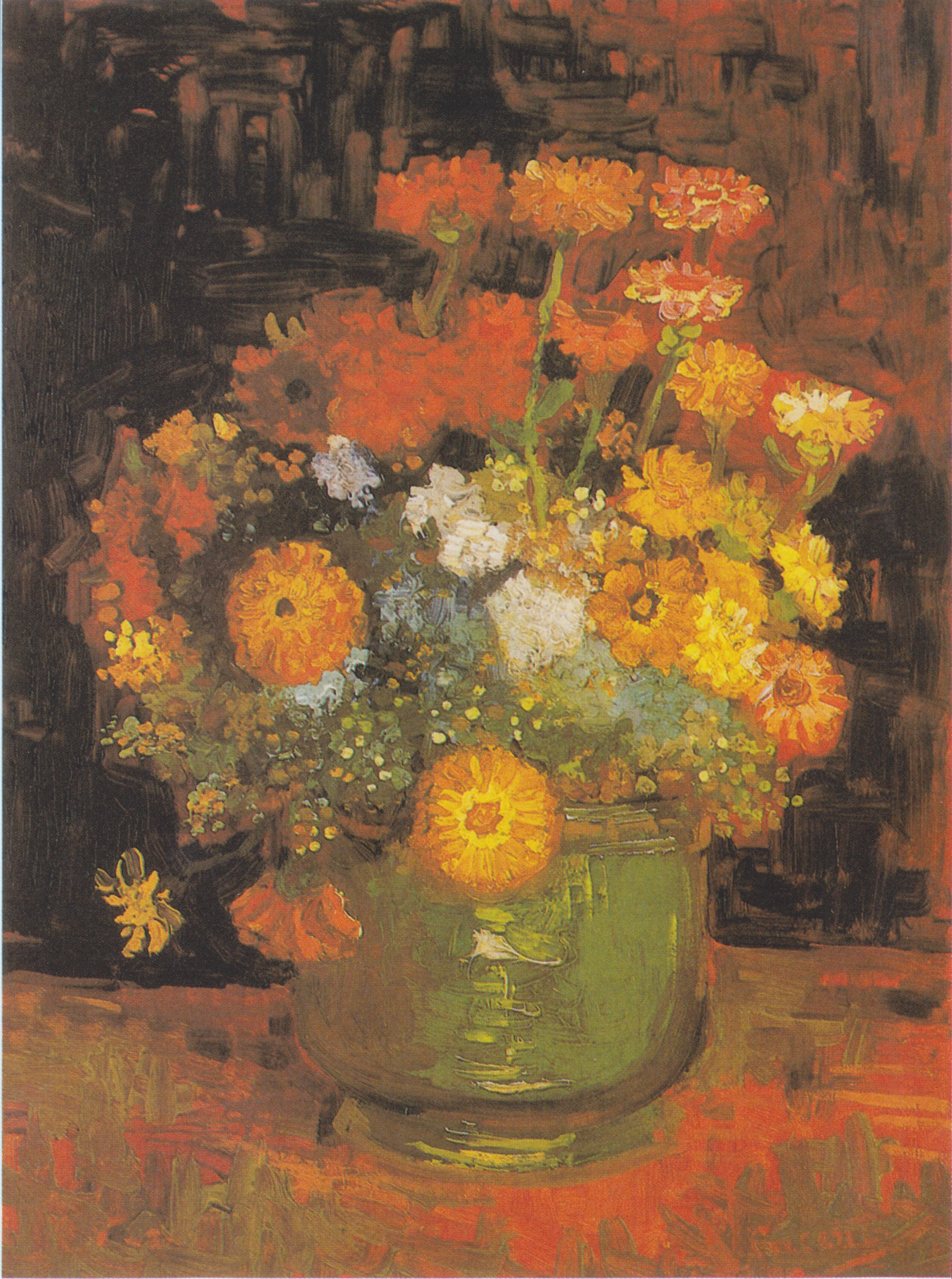
Vincent van Gogh:
Vase mit Zinnien

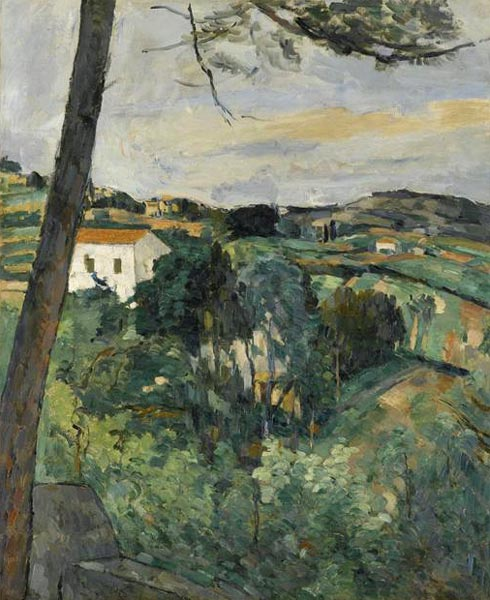
Paul Cézanne:
Provençalische Landschaft mit rotem Dach

== Looted art ==
In 1940 Maria Newman stored some of the pictures from the collection in the safe of a Berlin bank, but in 1945 the safe was looted. Some of the stolen art has since reappeared. Ferdinand Hodler's Forest Interior Near Reichenbach is now in the rectorate of the University of Zurich. Two other artworks - Degas' Dancer and Monet's Le repos dans le jardin, Argenteuil- turned up in New York at the Metropolitan Museum in New York as a donation from museum Trustee Jayne Wrightsman. The museum reached a financial settlement with the Newman heirs, and later auctioned the paintings. The heirs sold further works of art in the decades after the Second World War. Other pictures, such as Max Liebermann's portrait of Maria Newman, are still owned by the family today.

== Literature ==
- Ulrich Luckhardt, Uwe M. Schneede: Private Schätze : über das Sammeln von Kunst in Hamburg bis 1933. Christians, Hamburg 2001, ISBN 3-7672-1383-4.
- Stefanie Busold: "Henry P. Newman: Hamburger Großkaufmann und Mäzen". Hamburg University Press, Hamburg 2012, ISBN 978-3-937816-93-7.
