= Harry Newman =

Harry Newman may refer to:

- Harry Newman (American football) (1909–2000), American football quarterback
- Harry Newman (rugby league) (born 2000), English rugby league footballer
- Harry Newman (politician) (1839–1904), Australian politician
- Harry Neumann (1891–1971), sometimes Newman, Hollywood cinematographer

== See also ==
- Henry Newman (disambiguation)
