= Charlie Newman (Australian footballer) =

Australian rules footballer

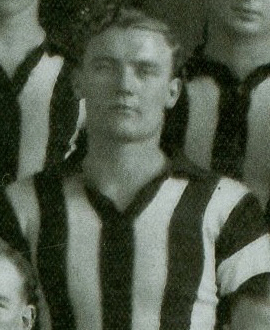
- Newman in 1940

Personal information
- Full name: Charles Alexander John Newman
- Born: 6 December 1920; Yarra Junction, Victoria
- Died: 28 August 1991 (aged 70); Richmond, Victoria
- Original team: Abbotsford
- Height: 180 cm (5 ft 11 in)
- Weight: 82 kg (181 lb)

Playing career^{1}
Years	Club	Games (Goals)
1940–42	Collingwood	17 (0)
1943–45	Melbourne	15 (0)
Total		32 (0)
- ^{1} Playing statistics correct to the end of 1945.

Charles Alexander John Newman (6 December 1920 – 28 August 1991) was an Australian rules footballer who played with Collingwood and Melbourne in the Victorian Football League (VFL).
