= Daniel M. Neuman =

American music educator (born 1944)

Daniel M. Neuman (born 1944) is the Mohindar Brar Sambhi Chair of Indian Music and Interim Director of the Herb Alpert School of Music, University of California, Los Angeles and also a published author of 10 books, being held in 1,163 libraries, the highest book is in 728 libraries worldwide. He has also been active in multimedia development, having received several grants for developing the World Music Navigator, a computerized ethnographic atlas from the early 1990s.

== Education and early career ==
He received both his Bachelor of Arts and also Ph.D. in anthropology from the University of Illinois. He has also taught at Dartmouth College and also University of Washington, where he held the position of Director of the School of Music for years until then becoming the Director of the UCLA School of the Arts and Architecture from 1996 to 2002 and then also subsequently holding the position of UCLA's Executive Vice Chancellor and Provost from 2002 to 2006.

== Publications ==
- The Life of Music in North India: The Organization of an Artistic Tradition. Wayne State University Press, 1980. ISBN 978-0814316320.
  - University of Chicago Press, 1990. ISBN 978-0226575162. With a new preface.
- Neuman, Daniel M. (Winter–Spring 2023). "Remembering My Teachers-Bruno Nettl and Sabri Khan: Society for Asian Music 2022 Keynote Address". Asian Music. 54 (1): 4–27, 160–161. doi:10.1353/amu.2023.0001. ProQuest 2883016075.
