= Charles Newman (judge) =

Charles William Frank Newman is a British Judge and member of the Judicial Appointments Commission.

Newman was admitted as a solicitor in 1972 and appointed Registrar of the County Court in 1987. He has served as Chair of the District Judges IT Working Group and is currently a member of the Judicial Advisory Group for IT. Until January 2006, he was a member of the Deputy District Judge Selection Panel and Chair of the Quality Review Group for that competition. From January 2006, Newman was a member of the Judicial Appointments Commission as a representative for the judiciary. On 1 August 2018, Newman retired from the District Bench.
