= Jack Newman (doctor) =

Canadian physician and breastfeeding activist

Jack Newman (born 1946) is a Canadian pediatrician, author, speaker, and video producer specializing in breastfeeding medicine.

== Early life and education ==
Newman was born in Tel Aviv, moving to Canada when he was fifteen months old. He graduated from the University of Toronto medical school in 1970 and interned at the Vancouver General Hospital before working as senior house surgeon at the Hutt Hospital in New Zealand.

== Career ==
Between 1977 and 1981 he did his pediatric training in Quebec City and Toronto, becoming a fellow of the Royal College of Physicians of Canada in 1980 and board certified by the American Academy of Pediatrics in 1981. For the next 1½ years he worked as a pediatrician at the Umtata Hospital in South Africa. From 1983 to 1992 Newman worked as a staff pediatrician at Toronto's Hospital for Sick Children, where he opened the first hospital-based breastfeeding clinic in Canada in 1984. Several more clinics were opened under his guidance, though all of them have since closed, the last of them in 2005 at North York General Hospital.

Newman works at the Newman Breastfeeding Clinic & International Breastfeeding Centre in Toronto. He has spoken at many conferences on breastfeeding, in Canada, the United States, Turkey, France, Germany, Russia, Ukraine, and India.

== Works ==
- The Latch: and other keys to breastfeeding success (2006), Amarillo, Tex: Hale Pub. ISBN 0-9772268-5-9
- Dr. Jack Newman's guide to breastfeeding (2000), with Teresa Pitman, HarperCollins Publishers. ISBN 0-00-638568-0
- The ultimate breastfeeding book of answers: the most comprehensive problem-solution guide to breastfeeding from the foremost expert in North America (2003), Pearson Education. ISBN 0-7615-2996-9)
- What they didn't teach you about breastfeeding in medical school (2001), Richmond, Va: VCU Health System, MCV Hospitals and Physicians, Dept. of Continuing Medical Education. Videorecording.
- Breastfeeding: empowering parents. Published as both eBook and a paperback on Amazon.
- What Doctors don't know about Breastfeeding. Praeclarus publisher, Amarillo Texas. (eBook and paperback) Available also on Amazon.
