= Neuman =

Neuman is a German surname. People with the surname include:

- Abraham A. Neuman (1890—1970), American rabbi, historian, and president of Dropsie College
- Alberto Neuman (1933–2021), Argentine classical pianist
- Andrés Neuman (born 1977), Argentine writer and poet
- Brandon Neuman, American politician, elected to the Pennsylvania House of Representatives in 2011
- Daniel M. Neuman (born 1944), American professor and author
- E. Jack Neuman (1921–1998), American writer and producer
- Edward Neuman (born 1943), Polish-American mathematician
- Gerald L. Neuman, Harvard Law School professor
- Henry D. Neuman or Neumann (fl. 1860–1874), German-born American burglar, bank robber and gang leader known as Dutch Heinrichs
- Mark Neuman (born 1959), American politician, member of the Alaska House of Representatives
- Mic Neuman, American producer, director and television program creator
- Michael A. Neuman (born 1955), Canadian business executive
- Molly Neuman, American rock drummer
- Otto Christian Neuman (1869–1938), American politician, member of the Minnesota House of Representatives
- Petr Neuman (1978–2025), Czech chess grandmaster
- Robert Neuman, professor of art history at Florida State University
- Robert S. Neuman (1926–2015), abstract painter
- Susan B. Neuman, educator, researcher, professor and education policymaker
- W. Russell Neuman, John Derby Evans Professor of Media Technology at the University of Michigan (2001–2013)
- William F. Neuman (1919–1981), American biochemist and author

== Fictional characters ==
- Alfred E. Neuman, Mad magazine mascot and cover boy
