= Dutch Heinrichs =

German-born American burglar, bank robber and gang leader

- Born: Henry Neuman; Northern Germany
- Other names: Charles Neuman; Edward Neumans; Dutch Heinrich; Dutch Hendricks; George Gardner; George Gardnier; James Ryan
- Occupation: Criminal
- Known for: New York burglar and gang leader; founder of the Hell's Kitchen Gang.

Henry D. Neuman or Neumann (fl. 1860–1874) was a German-born American burglar, bank robber and gang leader known as Dutch Heinrichs. A member of Chauncey Johnson's burglary gang during the late 1860s, he was also the founder of the Hell's Kitchen Gang which terrorized West Manhattan for over two decades.

== Biography ==
=== Early life and criminal career ===
Born Henry D. Neuman in northern Germany, he immigrated to New York with his family as a child. Having a respectable middle class upbringing, it is unknown motivations that led him to pursue a criminal career. He was involved in petty theft as a teenager, referred to as "The Flying Dutchman", and was associated with the Greenthals and the Mandlebaums. In 1860, he was arrested after stealing a watch from a man at the corner of Broadway and Canal Street, presumably his first criminal act, for which he was convicted and spent two years in New York State Prison. During his time in prison, he became friends with noted bond robber Chauncey Johnson and joined his gang upon his release. He eventually became his chief lieutenant and was involved in numerous robberies with the gang including $16,000 from the Adam Express Company, $21,000 from the Vesey Street robbery and, most notably, the theft of $1,000,000 in bonds from industrialist Rufus L. Lord. Other participants in the robbery included Jack Tierney and Hod Ennis.

In 1865, he was charged with stealing two bags of gold worth $10,000 from the Bank of Commerce as well as a later robbery in Philadelphia but was acquitted in both cases. On March 6, 1866, he attempted to steal a package from the Broadway Bank containing a $2,283 deposit, but was caught by passersby as he exited the bank. In June 1867, he appeared in court three months later and pleaded guilty to grand larceny.

Although Heinrichs earned a substantial sum from his criminal activities, he usually gambled it away as soon as he earned it. On one occasion, he was said to have lost $23,000 after a major bank robbery. Once night in 1867 however, he walked into a Chatham Street faro parlor with $3 and ended up walking out with $5,000 and broke the bank. He later married the sister of sportsman, gambler and sometime confidence man Tom Davis.

=== Hell's Kitchen Gang ===
In 1868, Heinrichs organized the Hell's Kitchen Gang whose members committed street muggings and petty theft in the areas between Eighth Avenue and Thirty-Fourth Street. He later joined with Ike Marsh and the Tenth Avenue Gang launching a campaign against the Hudson River Railroad which included extortion, breaking and entering, destruction of railroad property and armed robbery. Both Heinrichs and Marsh co-led the gang until Henrich began facing legal problems during the early 1870s.

=== Imprisonment and later years ===
On January 15, 1870, shortly after his release from Blackwell's Island, Heinrichs and three "well-dressed, gentleman looking" men appeared at several Uptown Manhattan banks including the Bleecker Street Savings Bank, Manhattan Bank and the East River Bank among others but quickly left as soon as they were spotted by bank officials. They eventually gave up took a downtown trolley car where they disappeared.

On February 14, 1872, two unidentified men stole $33,000 in bonds belonging to the New London and Ashland Railroads from the banking firm of J.S. Kennedy & Sons at their Cedar Street office. Information provided by a private detective led to Heinrichs' arrest and the investigation was taken over by Wall Street detectives. Central Office detectives came to his defense claiming Heinrichs had been held in custody at the time the robbery occurred. He had been suspected of stealing a watch from C. Godfrey Gunther, former Mayor of New York, however the gang leader's evidence was refused at trial. Convicted of grand larceny, he was sentenced to ten years imprisonment.

Initially sent to New York State Prison, he was sent to The Tombs eight months later. Heinrichs soon began exhibiting signs of extreme violence and paranoia while in prison. On September 24, 1872, he attacked his cellmate Jacob Rosenzweig believing he was spying on him. He reportedly did not recognize his lawyers when they came to visit him. His council successfully appealed to the Supreme Court for a retrial. As a result of the court's review of his case, a precedent was set in state criminal law that "when a party on trial avails himself of the recent statute allowing an accused to be a witness on his own behalf, he is not disqualified to testify by reason of a former conviction or felony". On May 7, 1873, officials announced that Heinrichs would be committed to the insane asylum at Wards Island.
