= Nu'man =

Nu'man (Arabic: نعمان, romanized: Nuʿmān) is an Arabic given name dating to pre-Islamic times, meaning blood or red. Prevailingly, the Islamic given name is most commonly associated to the Arabic word meaning bliss. It is also used with the definite article, النعمان, transliterated an-Nu'man or al-Nu'man.

Alternatives spellings include Nauman, Noman, Nouman, Noumaan, and Numan.

Notable people with the name include:

- seven of the Ghassanid Kings (327-ca. 600)
- Al-Nu'man I ibn Imru' al-Qays (reigned ca. 390–418), king of the Lakhmids
- Al-Nu'man II ibn al-Aswad (reigned 497–503), king of the Lakhmids
- Al-Nu'man VI ibn al-Mundhir (active 581–583), king of the Ghassanids
- Al-Nu'man III ibn al-Mundhir (active 582–ca. 602), king of the Lakhmids
- Nouman ibn Muqarrin (died 641), one of the companions of Muhammad
- Nuʿmān ibn Thābit ibn Zuṭā ibn Marzubān, known as Abū Ḥanīfa (699–767), founder of the Sunni Hanafi school of Islamic jurisprudence
- Qadi al-Nu'man (died 974), Isma'ili jurist, official historian of the Fatimid caliphs
- Köprülü Numan Pasha (1670–1719), Grand Vizier of the Ottoman Empire
- Noman Çelebicihan (1885–1918), Crimean Tatar politician
- Ahmad Muhammad Numan (1909–1996), twice Prime Minister of the Yemen Arab Republic
- Yasin Said Numan (born 1948), Prime Minister of the People's Democratic Republic of Yemen, 1986–1990
- Mohamed Noman Galal (born 1943), Egyptian diplomat and author
- Noman Mubashir (born 1974), Pakistani-Norwegian journalist
- Noman Bashir, Pakistani admiral
- Nomanul Haq (born 1948), Pakistani-American historian
- Marwan Abdullah Abdulwahab Noman, Yemeni diplomat
- No'man Ashour (1918–1987), Egyptian poet and playwright
- Noman Benotman (born 1967), Libyan politician
- Noman Masood (born 1968), Pakistani television actor
- Noman Ijaz (born 1965), Pakistani television and film actor
- Nouman Ali Khan (born 1978), Pakistani-American Muslim speaker

== See also ==
- Order of Al Nu'man, an Omani order awarded to diplomats
- Nuaman, name of a Palestinian hamlet outside Jerusalem
- Ma`arrat an-Nu`man, city in Syria
- Naaman (disambiguation)
- Nomani
