= Jeff Newman =

Jeff Newman may refer to:

- Jeff Newman (baseball), American baseball player
- Jeff Newman (musician), pedal steel guitar player and Nashville session musician
- Jeff Newman (TV personality), TV personality on TVW-7 in Perth, Western Australia
