= Richard Newman =

Richard Newman may refer to:

- Colonel Richard Newman (c. 1620–1695), English barrister and Royalist officer during the English Civil War
- Sir Richard Newman, 1st Baronet (c. 1675–1721), English MP for Milborne Port in 1701
- Richard Newman (English cricketer) (1756/57–1808), 18th-century English landowner, absentee landlord and cricketer
- Richard Newman (priest) (1871–1961), Archdeacon of Blackburn, 1936–1946
- Richard Newman (Australian cricketer) (1924–2014), Australian cricketer
- Richard Newman (actor), American voice actor
- Richard P.A.C. Newman (1955–2000), British physicist
- Richard Newman (poet) (born 1966), American poet
- Richard Newman (broadcaster) (born 1972), British-Canadian writer and broadcaster, former Big Brother UK contestant
- Richard G. Newman, chairman emeritus for AECOM
- Richard S. Newman, American academic
- Ricky Newman (born 1970), English footballer
