= Walter Newman =

Walter Newman may refer to

- Walter Newman (screenwriter), American radio writer and screenwriter
- Walter Stephenson Newman, president of Virginia Tech
- Walter Newman (civic figure) (died 2012), central figure in the cultural development of San Francisco, California
