= Eric Newman (footballer) =

English footballer

Personal information
- Full name: Eric Ivan Alfred Newman
- Date of birth: 24 November 1924
- Place of birth: Romford, England
- Date of death: January 1971 (aged 46)
- Place of death: Tenterden, England
- Position: Goalkeeper

Senior career*
Years	Team	Apps	(Gls)
- Whitton United
- Romford
1945–1946	Ipswich Town	0	(0)
1946–1950	Arsenal	0	(0)
1950–1953	Ipswich Town	18	(0)
1953–1955	Chelmsford City	51	(0)
- Clacton Town
- * Club domestic league appearances and goals

Eric Newman (24 November 1924 — January 1971) was an English footballer who played as a goalkeeper.

== Career ==
Newman began his career playing for non-league clubs Whitton United and Romford.

In 1945, Newman signed for Ipswich Town, before leaving to join Arsenal in October 1946. On 8 September 1950, Newman re-signed for Ipswich, making 18 Football League appearances in three years at the club.

Following his second spell with Ipswich, Newman signed for Chelmsford City. Following two seasons with Chelmsford, Newman signed for Clacton Town in May 1955.
