= Victor Newman (disambiguation) =

Victor Newman may refer to:

- Victor Newman (politician), Ghanaian politician and research analyst
- Victor Newman (fictional character) from the American CBS soap opera The Young and the Restless
- Vic Newman Jr., from the American CBS soap opera The Young and the Restless

== See also ==
- Victor Neumann, Romanian historian
