= Michael Robert Neuman =

Engineer at Michigan Technological University

Michael Robert Neuman is an engineer at Michigan Technological University in Houghton, Michigan. He was named a Fellow of the Institute of Electrical and Electronics Engineers (IEEE) in 2013 for his work with biomedical sensors and instrumentation with clinical applications.
