= Adrian Newman =

Adrian Newman may refer to:

- Adrian Newman (producer), Australian songwriter and record producer
- Adrian Newman (bishop) (born 1958), British Anglican bishop
