= Peter Newman =

Peter Newman may refer to:

- Peter C. Newman (1929–2023), Canadian journalist who emigrated from Nazi-occupied Czechoslovakia
- Peter Kenneth Newman (1928–2001), English economist, historian of economic thought
- Peter R. Newman (1926–1975), British writer
- Peter Newman (environmental scientist) (born 1945), Australian writer on urban planning and sustainability
- Peter Newman (actor) (born 1942), American actor best known for his voice-over work for Rankin-Bass
- Peter Newman (film producer) (born 1952), American film producer
- Peter Newman (tennis), Australian tennis player of the 1950s, see 1958 Wimbledon Championships – Men's Singles
- Peter Newman (author), English author of fantasy novels and short stories
- Peter Anim Newman (1890–1984), Ghanaian religious leader

== See also ==
- Peter Neumann (disambiguation)
