= Tom Newman =

Tom or Thomas Newman may refer to:

- Tom Newman (billiards player) (1894–1943), British player of English billiards and snooker
- Tom Newman (musician) (Thomas Dennis Newman, born 1943), musician and producer
- Tom Newman (scientist) (fl. 1985), researcher in nanotechnology
- Thomas Newman (Thomas Montgomery Newman, born 1955), American composer
- Thomas Newman (MP) (fl. 1415–23), lawyer and member of the Parliament of England
- Thomas C. Newman (1852–1928), Chicago saloonkeeper and co-creator of Cohasset Punch
