= Bernard Newman =

Bernard Newman or Bernie Newman may refer to:

- Bernard Newman (politician) (1914–1995), Canadian politician
- Bernie Newman (Wisconsin politician), American politician
- Bernard Newman (writer) (1897–1968), British author
- Bernard Newman (judge) (1907/08–1999), Judge on the United States Court of International Trade
- Bernard Newman (designer) (1903–1966), American fashion designer for Bergdorf Goodman and RKO Pictures
- Bernard Newman (swimmer) (1935–2007), Welsh swimmer
