= James C. Newman =

American scientist

James C. Newman is an American engineer and materials scientist known for his work on fracture and fatigue for aerospace vehicles. NASA has listed him as a "Superstar of Modern Aeronautics".

He is known for his work in safety analysis of structures, and pioneered the finite element studies of planar cracks in three-dimensional finite bodies, and the development of extensive stress intensity factor equations. These solutions are now considered to be classic contributions to Fracture Mechanics, and are used as benchmarks for new crack stress analysis methods. He developed the theory for predicting plasticity induced crack closure and software Fastran, which is widely used in the aircraft industry.

In 2001, Newman left NASA for a professorship at Mississippi State University, where he developed a Fatigue and Fracture Laboratory and a new ASTM fracture standard (E-2472).

Many of the stress-intensity-factor solutions for crack configurations in the ASTM fatigue-crack growth and fracture standards were developed by Newman, along with stress-intensity-factor solutions and equations for three-dimensional crack configurations, such as surface cracks and corner cracks at holes. His life-prediction model and code FASTRAN is used to make life assessments of aircraft structures and is one of the life-prediction options in NASGRO. FASTRAN was successfully used to predict the onset of widespread fatigue damage in simulated aircraft fuselage components during the NASA/FAA aging aircraft studies in the 1990s.

He has pioneered the use of the critical crack-tip-opening-angle (CTOA) fracture criterion for aircraft structures, which was successfully used by Boeing-Long Beach to predict the residual strength of a damaged fuselage structure tested at Wright-Patterson Air Force Base within 5% of the failure pressure. Recently, he has promoted the use of the compression precracking test methods to generate fatigue-crack-growth threshold data without load-history effects.
