= Troy Newman =

Troy Newman may refer to:

- Troy Newman (activist), American anti-abortion activist
- Troy Newman (singer), Australian singer-songwriter and musician
