= Neumann Kaffee Gruppe =

Germany coffee company

Neumann Gruppe GmbH
- Type: GmbH
- Industry: Coffee cultivation, green coffee service provider
- Founded: 1989 in Hamburg, Germany
- Headquarters: Hamburg, Germany
- Key people: David M. Neumann; Justin Schulze-Smidt; Maren Uzarek
- Revenue: €4.06 billion (2024)
- Number of employees: 3014 (2024)
- Website: www.nkg.coffee

Neumann Gruppe GmbH is the parent company of Neumann Kaffee Gruppe, a green coffee service provider headquartered in Hamburg. The Group is privately owned and managed. The CEO is David M. Neumann, a member of the founding family.

With more than 40 companies in 28 countries, the group operates in the areas of export and milling, farm management, import, and other services along the coffee supply chain.

== History ==
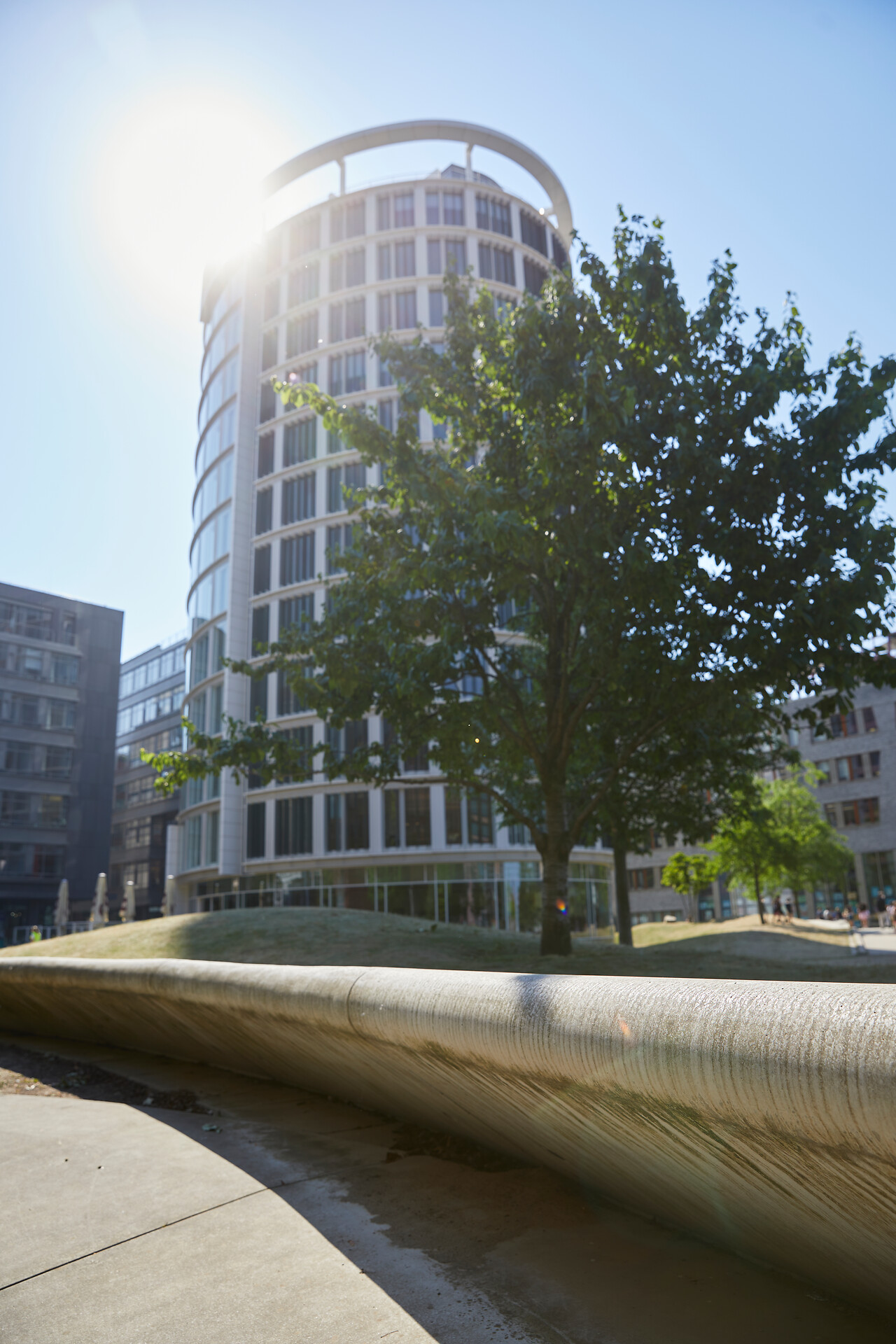
Neumann Kaffee Gruppe headquarters in Hamburg

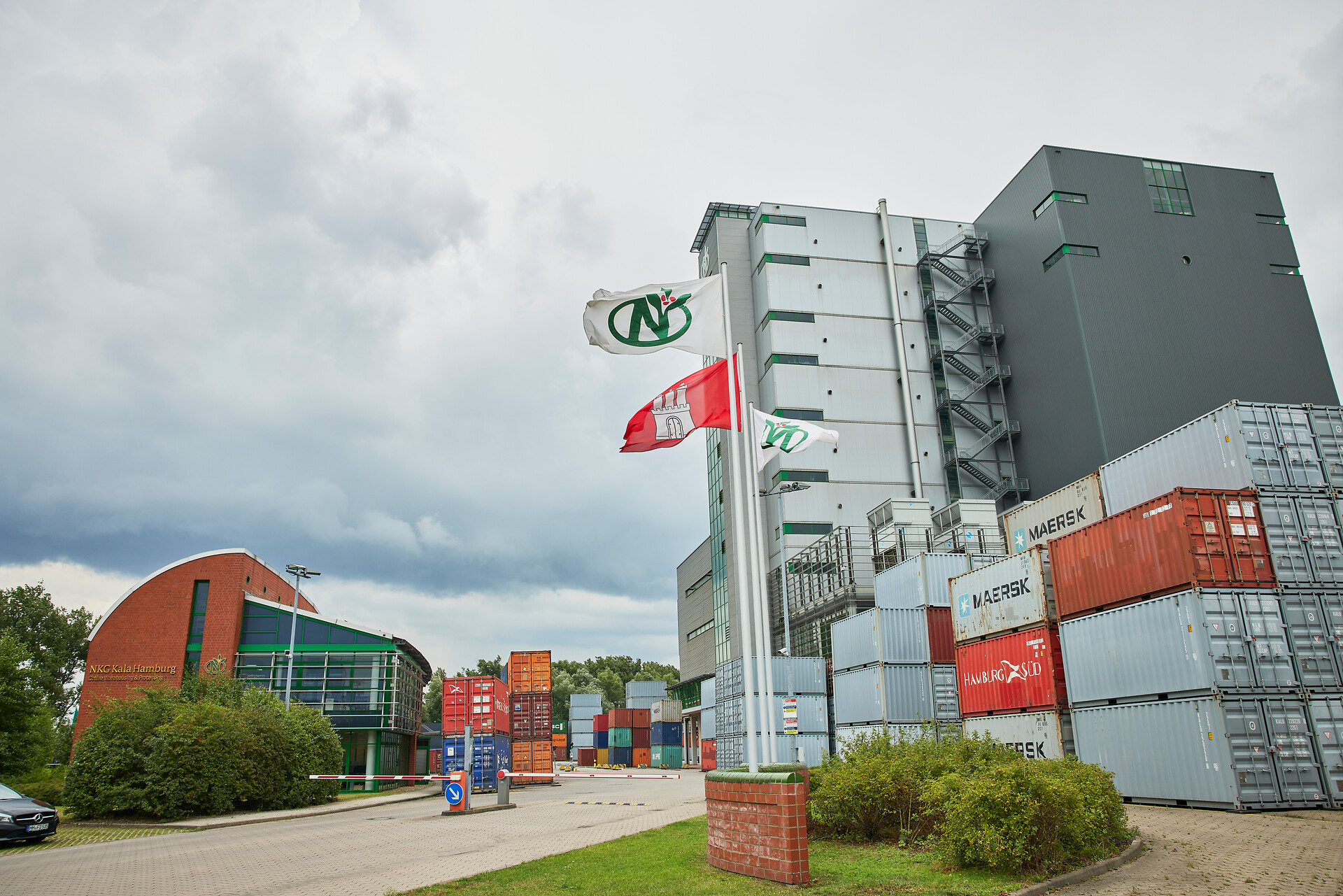
NKG Kala in Hamburg

=== Origins and early development ===
Neumann Kaffee Gruppe traces its origins to a green coffee trading company founded in Hamburg in 1934. Under Hanns R. Neumann, the business initially established itself as a brokerage and agency and expanded its international activities from the 1950s and 1960s onward. Michael R. Neumann joined the company in the 1960s. In 1988, Neumann acquired the Hamburg-based competitor Bernhard Rothfos AG (founded in 1922).

In 1989, the founder's son Michael R. Neumann assumed leadership of the company. In the same year, Neumann Kaffee Gruppe was established from the two companies and their subsidiaries. As part of this restructuring, Hanns R. Neumann GmbH was replaced by the company's current holding entity, Neumann Gruppe GmbH. Bernhard Rothfos AG was renamed Bernhard Rothfos GmbH and integrated into the group as its trading house.

After German reunification, Neumann Gruppe assumed the supply contracts previously concluded by the GDR in the early 1990s and thereby became a buyer of Vietnamese green coffee.

=== Developments since the 2000s ===
In 2004, David M. Neumann succeeded his father Michael R. Neumann as Spokesperson of the management board (today: Board of Directors), while his father became chairman of the supervisory board.

NKG Kala Hamburg GmbH relocated to Hamburg-Wilhelmsburg in 2006 as part of the HafenCity development project. In 2010, Neumann Gruppe, along with Bernhard Rothfos and InterAmerican Coffee Hamburg, which had previously been located in the same building as NKG Kala, moved into the newly built corporate headquarters in Hamburg at the Coffee Plaza, a high-rise building at Sandtorpark.

Furthermore, in 2008 the group founded subsidiaries in France, India, and the United States. In the same year, one in seven coffee beans traded worldwide was handled by Neumann Kaffee Gruppe.

=== International activities since 2016 ===
In 2016, large-scale mills in Brazil and Colombia were commissioned, followed by investments in coffee-producing countries in 2017. In 2018, Atlas Coffee Importers, a coffee importer based in Seattle, was acquired.

In the following years, NKG developed several international sustainability initiatives, including NKG Bloom (2019) and NKG Verified (2021). In 2022, the NKG Partnership to Advance Coffee Equity (NKG PACE) was launched, a project aimed at supporting Black Americans in the coffee industry.

In 2023, the Group established NKG Korea, its first company in South Korea. Prior to this, NKG had already been represented in the region through NKG Vietnam, Berindo Jaya in Indonesia, NKG India Coffee in India, and Bero Coffee Singapore in Southeast Asia.

In the same year, the group acquired a majority stake in the Oslo-based specialty coffee importer Nordic Approach and its spin-off Tropiq. Since 2011, Nordic Approach had been active in the European and North American markets for green coffees. The group had previously worked with importers as Atlas Coffee Importers and InterAmerican Coffee.

In 2024, the expansion into Asia continued with the establishment of NKG Shanghai and NKG Indonesia.

== Company structure ==
Neumann Gruppe GmbH is the parent company of Neumann Kaffee Gruppe and is headquartered in Hamburg. The group is privately owned and managed. David M. Neumann, a third-generation member of the founding family, serves as CEO and leads the group together with Justin Schulze-Smidt and Maren Uzarek.

The group's activities range from coffee cultivation to the import of coffee into consumer markets. In 2024, 13.6 million 60-kg bags of coffee were processed, including 5.1 million bags of certified and sustainable coffee. Approximately 70 percent were Arabica and 30 percent Robusta coffee. Revenue in that year amounted to just under €4.06 billion, and the group employed more than 3,000 people.

As of 2025, the group has 40 subsidiaries in 28 countries. Its own cultivation sites are located in Brazil, Mexico, and Uganda. In addition, the group operates other locations worldwide.

In January 2025, Neumann Kaffee Gruppe introduced a regionalized leadership structure. Effective February 1, 2025, regional leadership positions were established for the regions Americas, Asia-Pacific, and Europe, Middle East and Africa (EMEA).

== Business segments ==
=== Farming ===
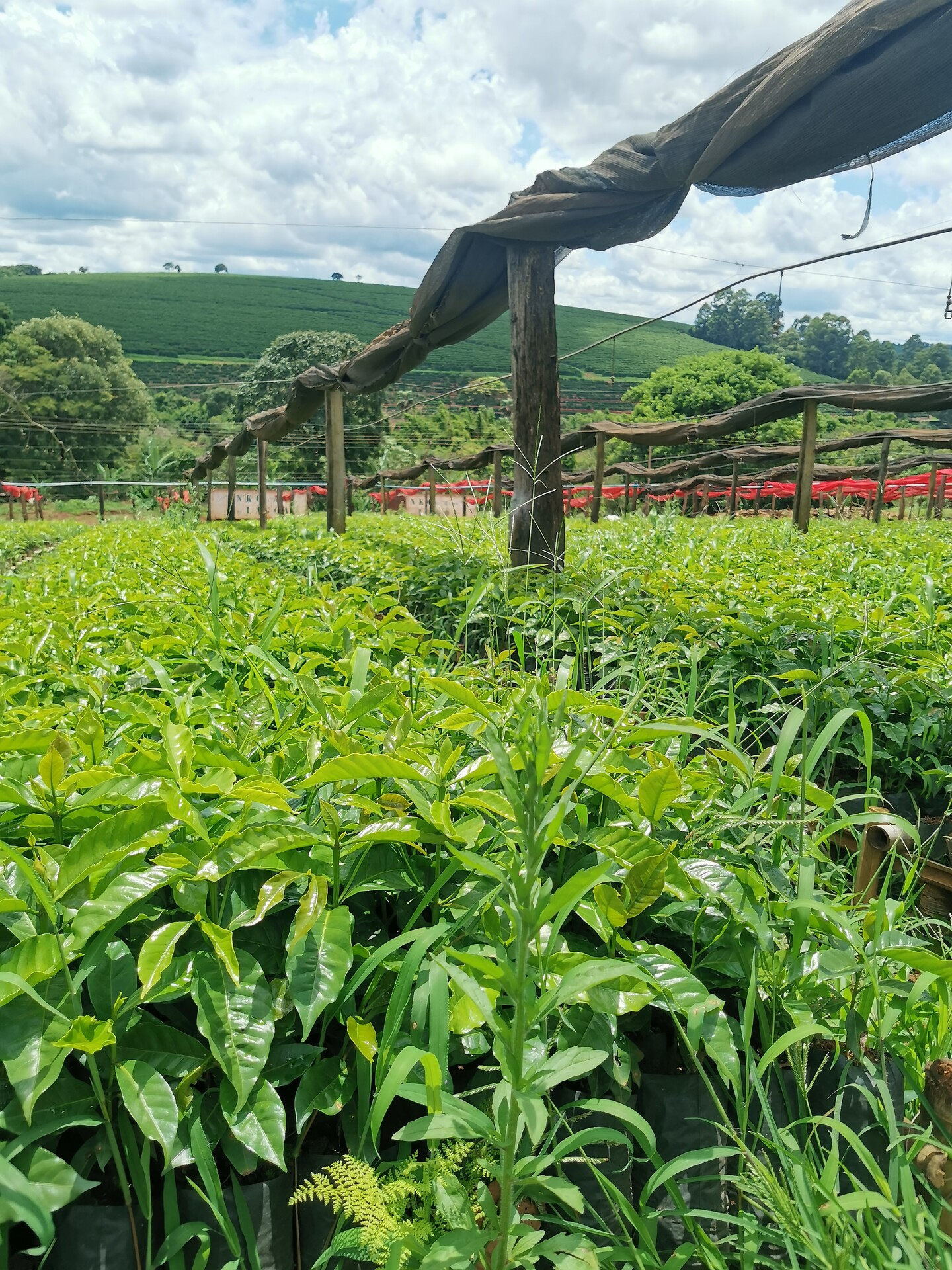
NKG Fazenda da Lagoa in Brazil

NKG operates its own farms in Mexico, Brazil and Uganda. Together, these have approximately 5,000 hectares of cultivation area on which Arabica and Robusta coffee are grown.

=== Export and milling ===
NKG is active in the global trade of green coffee and is among the larger buyers in several producing countries. Procurement is primarily carried out through local structures that organize purchasing from smallholder producers. In addition to purchasing, these activities include quality control as well as preparing the coffee for international shipment.

=== Import ===
Import activities include purchasing green coffee from the Group's own origin companies as well as from independent suppliers, logistics via international ports, and supplying roasters of various sizes.

In the import business, the Group initially supplied German roasters and later expanded its trading volume through the acquisition and integration of additional trading houses, including the Bernhard Rothfos Group in the 1980s. Since the early 1960s, NKG has been among the larger importers of green coffee into Germany, particularly in connection with the expansion of trade relations with Colombian suppliers.

=== Services ===
The Group's services cover the entire path of green coffee from origin to further processing. In addition to its own farm and milling operations as well as export and import services, these activities also include processing services such as preparation, drying, and quality control. The Group also operates mills and other processing facilities in several producing countries and carries out activities such as refining and blending.

In addition, the Group offers services in the areas of futures trading, logistics, green coffee processing, consulting, and development projects.

== Controversies ==
In 2001, Neumann Kaffee Gruppe, through its subsidiary Kaweri Coffee Plantation Ltd., established a coffee plantation on 2,500 hectares of land in Uganda's Mubende District. According to reports by human rights organizations and international media, the Ugandan army cleared four villages and driving out the inhabitants by force to make the land available for lease, and by that, allegedly hundreds of families were displaced. In 2002, residents filed claims against both the Ugandan government and Kaweri Coffee Plantation Ltd., seeking compensation. Neumann Kaffee Gruppe has been criticised for not stopping the evictions and not contributing to compensation. The company has disputed allegations that it was responsible for the evictions, stating that the land lease was granted by the Ugandan government and that affected residents were expected to receive compensation. The legal proceedings arising from the dispute remained unresolved as of 2025, while in 2022, 258 of the families accepted a settlement offered by the Ugandan public prosecutor's office.
