= Michael Newman (product marketer) =

Michael Newman is an American product development and marketing manager in the musical instrument and professional audio industries from San Diego, CA. Newman performed product management and marketing duties for some of the earliest digital audio workstation products from Digidesign, Tascam and Studer. Newman worked closely with Gerry Kearby at Studer, who later went on to form the online multi-media company Liquid Audio.

Newman performed marketing and product management duties for the Tascam MMR-8 and MMR-16 audio film dubbers which won an Emmy in 1995 for "Outstanding Achievement in Engineering Development". and an Emmy in 2000 during the "Prime Time Emmy Awards". In 2002 Newman joined Mackie as a senior product manager and soon thereafter become global director of product management in a restructuring move by the company. In 2005 Newman was hired by Stanton Magnetics and became the director of product management for Cerwin-Vega and KRK Systems. In 2009 Newman started a consulting service focused on social media marketing for musical instrument and professional audio companies.
