= Otto Christian Neuman =

American politician

Otto Christian Neuman was a member of the Minnesota House of Representatives.

== Biography ==
Neuman was born on June 29, 1869, in Inver Grove Heights, Minnesota. He moved with his parents to Traverse County, Minnesota, in 1886. In 1893, he married his first wife, Mary. They had one daughter before her death. On May 27, 1903, Neuman married Fannie Mapes, daughter of David P. Mapes, a former member of the New York State Assembly and founder of Ripon College. Neuman died on May 30, 1938, in Wheaton, Minnesota. He was a Lutheran.

== Career ==
Neuman was a member of the House of Representatives from 1917 to 1932. He was a Democrat.
