= Sébastien Neumann =

French baseball player (born 1993)

Medal record

Men's baseball

Representing France
Gold medal – first place	2012 Brno	

Sébastien Neumann (born February 15, 1993) is a French baseball player currently playing for the Tigres de Toulouse in the Division Elite. He has also appeared in numerous international tournaments. He is playing for Team France in the 2019 European Baseball Championship.

== Division Elite career ==
Neumann pitched for the Cougars de Montigny in 2010 and 2011 and has pitched for the Tigres de Toulouse since.

== International tournaments ==
The hurler played for the Under-19 French team in the 2009 Open International de Rouen. He played for France in the 2010 World Junior Baseball Championship and the 2011 European Junior Baseball Championship. He pitched for the French team in the 2012 European Under-21 Baseball Championship, winning a gold medal. He represented France in the 2015 Summer Universiade.
