= Andrea Neumann =

Andrea Neumann may refer to:

- Andrea Neumann (artist) (1969–2020) German visual artist and educator
- Andrea Neumann (musician) (born 1968) German musician and composer
