= Steve Newman =

Steve, Steven or Stephen Newman may refer to:

- Steven M. Newman (born 1954), listed in the Guinness Book of World Records as the first man to walk solo around the world
- Steve Newman (meteorologist), American broadcast meteorologist and editor of Earthweek: A Diary of the Planet
- Steve Newman (musician), South African acoustic guitarist
- Steve Newman (soccer) (1953–2012), retired American soccer forward
- Steven Newman (Australian footballer) (born 1965), retired Australian rules footballer
- Steven L. Newman (born c. 1967), American businessman.
- Stephen Newman (born 1964), member of the Virginia Senate
