= Mohamed Noman Galal =

Egyptian ambassador and author

السفير محمد نعمان جلال Ambassador Mohamed Noman Galal
- Galal addressing the United Nations General Assembly
- Born: 1943 (age 82–83); Asyut, Egypt
- Awards: The Royal Order of Saint Olav (Norway); First Order Merit of the Republic (Egypt)

Mohamed Noman Galal (Arabic: محمد نعمان جلال; born 1943) is a former Egyptian Ambassador and author. His appointments as a senior diplomat have included representing Egypt in China, Pakistan, India as well as the United Nations and the Arab League.

Galal has written over 40 books since 1974 on topics spanning Political-History, International Relations, Islam, and Human Rights. His writings are analytical and often interdisciplinary in nature.

== Career highlights as a diplomat ==
- 2001-2002 Assistant Foreign Minister for Economic and Political Policy Planning, Cairo.
- 1998-2001 Ambassador of the Arab Republic of Egypt to the People’s Republic of China, Beijing.
- 1995-1998 Ambassador of the Arab Republic of Egypt to the Islamic Republic of Pakistan, Islamabad.
- 1992-1995 Ambassador and Representative of Egypt to the Arab League, Cairo.
- 1989-1992 Minister Plenipotentiary, Egyptian Mission to the United Nations, New York.
- 1987-1989 Counselor, Egyptian Mission to the United Nations, New York.
- 1985-1987 Counselor, Office of the Foreign Minister, Cairo.
- 1980-1985 Counselor, Egyptian Embassy in India, New Delhi.
- 1969-1980 Served in diplomatic posts for Egypt in Jordan, Kuwait, UAE, and Norway.

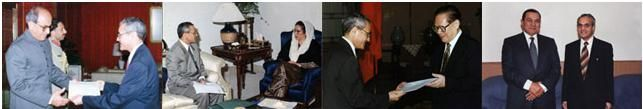
Left to Right: Galal with President Farooq Leghari of Pakistan, Prime Minister Benazir Bhutto of Pakistan, President Jiang Zemin of China, President Hosni Mubarak of Egypt.

== Selection of books authored ==
- Strategic Outlook on Bahrain and the Arab Middle East. Part 1-4, Co-authored with Mohammed Bin Jassim Alghatam, Bahrain Center for Studies and Research, Bahrain, 2005-2007.
- Arab Dialogue with the World on Current International Issues, Sang-E-Meel Publications, Lahore, Pakistan, 2006 (English).
- Arab and Muslim Challenges in a Changing World, Co-authored with Mohammed Bin Jassim Alghatam, Bahrain Center for Studies and Research, Bahrain, 2005 (English).
- Neo-Realism in Arab Thought: A Study of Jabber Ansari's Writings, Arab Institute for Studies and Publications, Beirut, Lebanon 2004.
- Strategy, Diplomacy and Protocol, Arab Institute for Studies and Publications, Beirut, Lebanon 2004.
- Diplomacy of International Dialogue, Alahram Center for Political and Strategic Studies, Cairo, 2003.
- Diplomacy and Protocol: Islamic Traditions and Modern Practice, Egyptian Organization for Books, Cairo 2003.
- China through Egyptian Eyes ed., Dar El Maaref, Reading Series, Cairo, 2002.
- Egypt: Arabism, Islam and Human Rights, Egyptian Organization for Books, Cairo 2000.
- The Arab World at a Crossroads, Dar El Maaref, Reading Series, Cairo, 1999.
- Dynamics of the Egyptian National Identity, Sangee-Meel publications, Lahore, 1998 (English).
- Pakistani-Egyptian Relations in a World Perspective, Sangee-Meel publications, Lahore, 1998 (English).
- Perspectives on Arab Security, Dar El Maaref, Reading Series, Cairo, 1997.
- The Egyptian National Identity (co-author), Egyptian Organization for Books, 1997 and 2001.
- Fifty Years of Egyptian-Pakistani Relations, Series on Egyptian History, Egyptian Organization for Books, 1997.
- The Arab League and its Prospective Challenges, Al-Ahram Center for Strategic Studies, 1995 (Arabic & English).
- Protocol in Islamic Traditions and Modern Practices, Cultural Library Series, Egyptian Organization for Books, 1995.
- Human Rights: Between Theory and Practice, Strategic Papers Series, Al-Ahram Center for Strategic Studies, 1994.
- Egyptian Foreign Policy and Non-Alignment at a Cross-Roads, Center for Political Research and Studies Cairo University, 1994.
- The Impact of the 1973 October War on Public Life and Egypt’s Foreign Relations (Co-author), Egyptian Book Organization, 1994.
- The Arab League and the Arab Charter on Human Rights, Center for Political Research and Studies Cairo University, 1994.
- Egypt and Human Rights: A Documentary Study, Egyptian Book Organization, 1993.
- Sino-Japanese Relations 1949-1972, dissertation for Ph.D.; published under the title The Struggle Between China and Japan, Madbouly Publishing House, Cairo, Egypt 1988.
- Non-Alignment in a Changing World, Egyptian Book Organization, 1987.
- Contemporary Currents of Thought in Egypt, Series on Egyptian History, Egyptian Book Authority, 1987.
- Social Democracy in Norway and Austria(Co-author), Egyptian Organization for Books, 1978.
- Culture and Politics in China, Al-Ahram Centre for Strategic Studies, Cairo, 1974.
