= David Newman (physicist) =

American nuclear scientist

David E. Newman is a professor in the physics department at the University of Alaska Fairbanks. He has a Ph.D. in plasma physics and conducts research on transport dynamics in fusion energy using numerical and complex systems models.
