= Chris Newman =

Chris Newman may refer to:

- Chris Newman (sound engineer) (1940–2025), American sound mixer and director
- Chris Newman (footballer) (born 1982), Australian rules footballer for the Richmond Football Club (AFL)
- Chris Newman (artist) (born 1958), composer, author and performance artist
- Chris Newman (actor) (born 1987), Irish actor from the show Aisling's Diary
- Chris Newman (American musician) (1953–2021), American songwriter, singer, guitarist, recording artist
- Chris Newman (British musician) (born 1952), British guitarist and songwriter
- Chris Newman (field hockey) (born 1990), British field hockey player
