= Fred Neiman =

English ventriloquist (1860–1910)

Fred Neiman (October 1860 – 25 December 1910) was an English ventriloquist, music hall performer, and variety agent.

He was born in Brighton; his father was a tailor, born in Hungary. After touring with a company presenting a panorama of the Russian-Turkish war, he made his first solo music hall appearance in Liverpool in 1878. He became noted for his skills at ventriloquism, developing his performances "to a standard previously unsurpassed in scale and originality". In London in 1883, he presented a show with seven dolls as a minstrel troupe, and "conversed" in a different voice with each one. In 1886 he presented a "Ventriloquial Parliament", with dolls caricaturing leading politicians of the time.

In 1887 he travelled to the United States for a two-year tour, and appeared at the White House before President Grover Cleveland. After returning to England, he toured with the Livermore Brothers Court Minstrels, and continued to present his own "Ventriloquial Minstrels". An 1892 photograph of Neiman is the first to show a performer with a small "knee pal" or dummy.

He later worked as a talent agent. He died in London on Christmas Day 1910, at the age of 50.
