= Terry Newman =

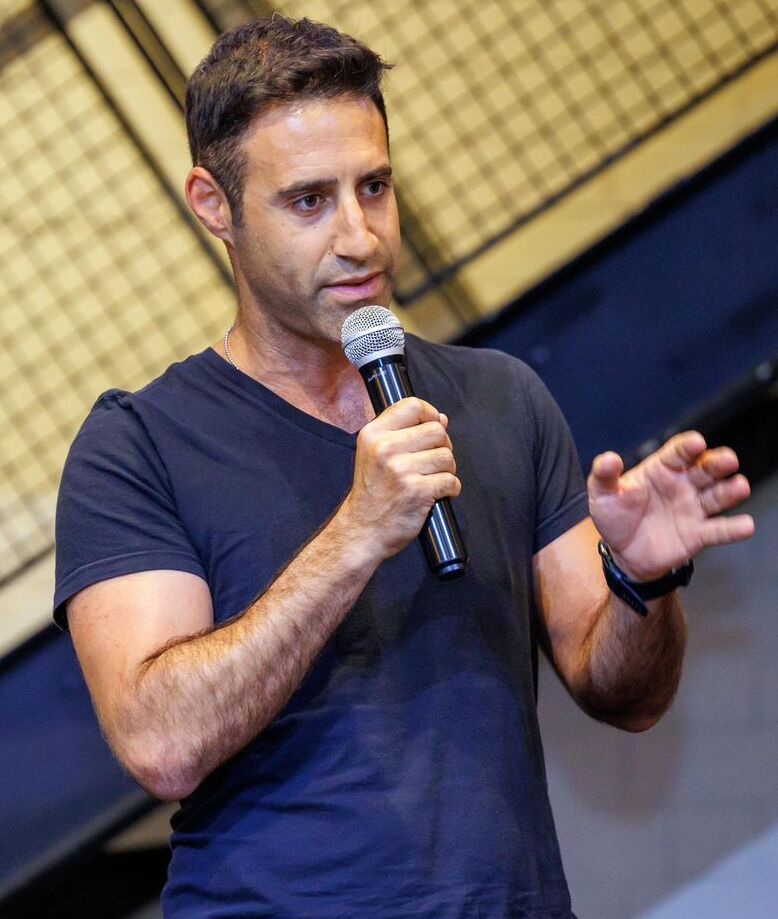
Newman in 2026.

Terry Newman (born 1981) is a British-Israeli businessman and author. He is the founder and chief executive of MCC London Limited, a company specializing in modular healthcare construction, and the chair of Isramarin Modular Construction. Newman co-founded the Tel Aviv International Salon, is a member of the World Jewish Congress's Jewish Diplomatic Corps, and in 2025 was appointed chairman of the public board of directors of BINA – The Jewish Movement for Social Change.

== Early life and education ==
Newman was born in 1981 in London and raised in Stanmore. He attended the Haberdashers’ Aske's Boys’ School and spent a year studying at Yeshivat Ein Tzurim in Israel. He earned a degree in Oriental studies from the University of Oxford and subsequently studied for a year at the Hebrew University of Jerusalem.

Prior to moving to Israel, Newman lived for a period in Cairo, Egypt. In 2006, at the age of 25, he immigrated to Israel (made aliyah) and settled in Netanya. He completed six months of mandatory military service in the Israel Defense Forces’ (IDF) search-and-rescue unit and continues to serve annually in the IDF reserves.

== Career ==
Newman began his career in British politics as chief of staff to Lord Greville Janner in the House of Lords. After a period as a strategy consultant at McKinsey & Company, he founded MCC London Limited (MCC Group) in 2007. MCC designs and builds modular hospitals and medical facilities for governments and organizations. From 2019 to 2020, MCC installed ten mobile field hospitals in Peru for the country's Ministry of Health in response to the COVID-19 pandemic.

In Israel, Newman served as the chairman of Isramarin Modular Construction, a company that uses pre-fabricated materials for rapid-construction housing. The company was sold in 2022.

In 2008, Newman co-founded the Tel Aviv International Salon, a non-profit forum that hosts prominent speakers for young professionals. He is also a member of the World Jewish Congress (WJC) Jewish Diplomatic Corps, a network involved in international advocacy. In June 2015, he chaired a WJC-organized rally in Geneva addressing the United Nations Human Rights Council.

In 2025, Newman was appointed chairman of the public board of BINA: The Jewish Movement for Social Change. He hosts a podcast titled "A Fresh Perspective" and, as of 2025, is co-authoring a book, The Jewish Century, on the relationship between Israel and global Jewry.

== Personal life ==
Newman is married to Yamit Newman, and they have three sons. The family resides in Netanya, Israel. He is fluent in English and Hebrew.

In 2017, he completed the Israman Garmin triathlon in Eilat and finished the final 100 metres hand-in-hand with his youngest son.
