= Ryan Newman =

Ryan Newman may refer to:

- Ryan Newman (racing driver) (born 1977), American stock car racing driver
- Ryan Newman (actress) (born 1998), American actress, singer, and model, now known as Ryan Whitney
- Ryan Dean Newman, American lawyer and former Army captain
