= Scott Newman =

Scott Newman may refer to:

- Scott Newman (actor) (1950–1978), American actor, son of Paul Newman
- Scott Newman (cricketer) (born 1979), English cricketer
- Scott Newman (politician) (born 1947), Republican politician and member of the Minnesota Senate
