= Noman Group =

Bangladeshi textile company

- Formation: 1997; 29 years ago
- Founder: Md. Nurul Islam
- Headquarters: Dhaka, Bangladesh
- Products: Textile, RMG, Fashion, Denim, Towel, Warp knitting, Spinning, Weaving, Fabrics, Real Estate
- Key people: Nurul Islam (Founder and Chairman), Noman Islam, Mohammad Abdullah Zaber & Mohammad Abdullah Zubair, Abdullah Talha
- Subsidiaries: Talha Spinning Mills Limited, Talha Fabrics Limited, Talha Texpro Limited, Zaber and Zubair Fabrics Limited, Noman Terry Towel Mills Limited, Nice Fabrics Processing Limited, Artex Fabrics Limited, Zaber and Zubair Accessories Limited, Nice Spinning Limited, Printology Limited, Artex Knit Limited, Artex Fabrics Limited, Ismail Anjuma Ara Fabrics Limited
- Revenue: ▲US$1.5 billion (2019) (2019)
- Staff: c. 70,000
- Awards: Largest Exporter of Bangladesh, HSBC Export Award, SCB Trade Award
- Website: www.nomangroup.com

Noman Group is a Bangladeshi conglomerate in the textiles and garments sector. Its companies export annually about $1 billion in textile and garment products around the world, and employ about 70,000 people. Noman Group produces yarns, fabrics, home textile, bed covers, curtain, comforters, quilt covers, denim and towels.

Noman Group customers are IKEA, Target Corporation, Ernsting’s family GmbH & Co. KG, GAP Inc., Tesco, Li & Fung, Otto Group, American Eagle Outfitters, Carrefour, The Walt Disney Company, Nike, Zara, Mango, Uniqlo, Walmart, Kmart, PVH, Nitori, Esprit Holdings, and HEMA.

== History ==
It was established in 1997. In 2011, Noman Group opened six textile factories; by that time, the company was operating 19 plants employing about 40,000 people.

In 2012, Noman opened a towel factory.

By 2015, the company operated 28 factories, and another five new plants were under development. In November, the Institute of Textile Engineers and Technologists and the Engineers Institute of Bangladesh protested outside the Jatiya Press Club protesting the assault of an engineer of Noman Group by the managing director of the group. A case was filed accusing ASM Rafiqul Islam, managing director of Noman Group, and his sister and director of the group, Noor-e-Yesmin Fatima. They denied the accusation and said the engineer was assaulted by garment workers and that he had embezzled money from the group.

In 2016, the Group exported more than $1 billion in garments, the first company in Bangladesh to do so, and had 70,000 employees. Noman Group exports to European Union, United States, Japan and Asian countries.

The Group suffered production shutdowns in Tongi due a shortage of gas supplies in October 2017 according to deputy managing director Mohammad Abdullah Zaber. In December 2017, Noman Group reported that they were the victims of three highway robberies in the last one and a half year. According to Bangladesh Garment Manufacturers and Exporters Association highway robberies are a major concern for garment manufacturers.

Noman Group announced plans to invest five billion BDT to build a Coolmax All Season fabric manufacturing unit in April 2018.

Zaber and Zubair (Z&Z) Fabrics Limited, a sister concern of leading garment exporter Noman Group. In 2022, the Ministry of Home Affairs issued a notice that, Inspector General of Police Benazir Ahmed and two other officials are going to Germany on a 9-day visit to check the quality of 100,000 pieces of bed sheet for double cot and pillows for the police department. The contract worth 175 million BDT was won by Noman Group. The news of the trip caused a stir in the social media which led to the cancelation of the trip. In November, the Group accused the editor of Daily Inqilab, AMM Bahauddin, and a reporter, Sayeed Ahmed, of defamation and sought 20 billion BDT in damages. The newspaper accused the group of embezzling 100 billion BDT in bank loans.

== Subsidiaries ==
- Noman Terry Towel Mills Limited
- Zaber & Zubair Fabrics
- Nice Denim Mills Limited
- Ismail Spinning Mills Limited
- Sufia Cotton Mills Limited
- Talha Spinning Mill Limited
- Yasmin Spinning Mills Limited
- Zaber Spinning Mills Limited
- Zubair Spinning Mills Limited
- Noman Fashion Fabrics Limited
- Noman Textile Mills Limited
- Noman Composite Textile Limited
- Ismail Textile Mills Limited
- Talha Fabrics Limited
- Zarba Textile Mills Limited
- Artex Fabrics Limited
- Marium Textile Mills
- Noman Home Textile Mills Limited
- Ismail Anjuman Ara Fabrics Limited
- Talha Tex Pro Limited
- Noman Fabrics Limited
- Zaber and Zubair Accessories Limited
- Ismail Anjuman Ara Trust
- Sufia Fabrics Limited
- Nice Microfab Limited
- Nice Spinning Mills Limited
- Nice Synthetic Yarn Mills Limited
- Zaber International

== Awards ==
HSBC Export Excellence Awards in 2012

National Export Trophy.
