= Don Newman =

Don Newman may refer to:

- Don Newman (broadcaster) (born 1940), Canadian television journalist
- Don Newman (basketball) (1957–2018), basketball coach
- Don M. Newman (1923–2021), American pharmacist

== See also ==
- Donald J. Newman (1930–2007), American mathematician
