= Dave Newman (footballer) =

Australian rules footballer

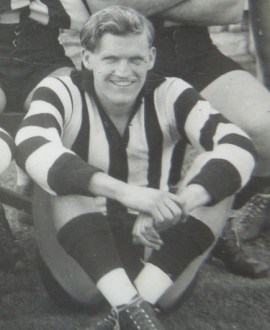
- Newman during his Collingwood career

Personal information
- Full name: Dave Newman
- Born: 28 February 1923
- Died: 4 February 1995 (aged 71)
- Original team: Fitzroy District
- Height: 175 cm (5 ft 9 in)
- Weight: 73 kg (161 lb)

Playing career^{1}
Years	Club	Games (Goals)
1944–47	Collingwood	49 (32)
1947	Melbourne	4 (1)
Total		53 (33)
- ^{1} Playing statistics correct to the end of 1947.

Dave Newman (28 February 1923 – 4 February 1995) was an Australian rules footballer who played with Collingwood and Melbourne in the Victorian Football League (VFL).
