= Frank Newman =

Frank Newman may refer to:

- Frank Newman (footballer) (1898–1977), English footballer who played for Port Vale
- Frank C. Newman (1917–1996), American law school dean, state supreme court judge, and scholar and reformer in international human rights law
- Frank Newman (educator) (1927–2004), American education reformer and president of the University of Rhode Island
- Frank N. Newman (born 1942), American banker and former United States Department of the Treasury official
