= Werner Neumann (judge) =

German jurist, lawyer and judge (born 1953)

Werner Neumann (born 1953, Freckenhorst) is a German jurist, lawyer and judge. Since 2010 he has been chief judge of the Federal Administrative Court of Germany.
