= John Lunn Newman =

British athlete

John Newman
Personal information
- Nationality: British (English)
- Born: 12 November 1916 Rochester, Kent, England
- Died: 14 February 1974 (aged 57) Burgess Hill, West Sussex, England

Sport
- Sport: Athletics
- Event: high jump
- Club: L.A.C. Lloyds Bank AC

John Lunn Newman also known as Jack Newman (12 November 1916 – 14 February 1974) was a male athlete who competed at the 1936 Summer Olympics.

== Biography ==
Newman won the London AC Schools' title in 1933 and AAA Junior title in 1934. He competed in the men's high jump at the 1936 Olympic Games.

Newman became the national high jump champion after winning the British AAA Championships title at the 1937 AAA Championships. He was also the AAA indoor champion three times in 1936, 1937 and 1939.

Newman represented England in the high jump at the 1938 British Empire Games in Sydney, Australia. At the times of the Games, Newman was a bank clerk by trade and lived in Landon Road, Rochester.

Newman regained his AAA high jump title at the 1939 AAA Championships before his career was interrupted by World War II, where Newman served in the Royal Air Force.

After the war Newman continued to compete and gained a third place behind Alan Paterson at the 1946 AAA Championships.
