= Joseph Newman =

Joe, Joey or Joseph Newman may refer to:

== Musicians ==
- Joe Newman (American musician) (1922–1992), American jazz musician
- Joe Newman (English musician) (born 1987), English lead vocalist of indie rock band Alt-J
- Joey Newman (born 1976), American film composer, orchestrator, arranger and conductor

== Writers ==
- Joseph Simon Newman (1891–1960), American poet and entrepreneur
- Joseph Newman (journalist) (1913–1995), American who lived in and wrote about Japan

== Others ==
- Joseph Newman (Texas settler) (1787–1831), Texas settler, one of Austin's Old Three Hundred
- Joseph Newman (politician) (1815–1892), New Zealand MP
- Joseph M. Newman (1909–2006), American film and TV director
- Joseph Westley Newman (1936–2015), American inventor who claimed to have built an energy machine
- Joe Newman (born 1937), American businessman, co-founder and CEO of American Basketball Association (2000–present)
