= Naumann (crater) =

Crater on the Moon

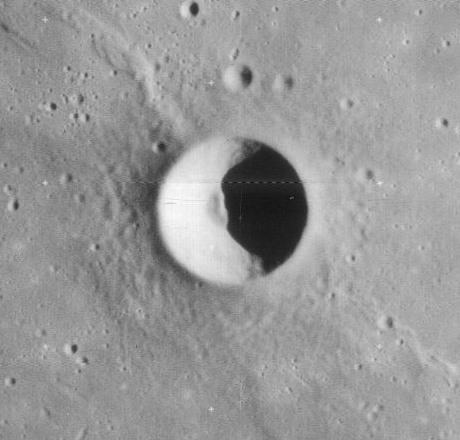
- Lunar Orbiter 4 image
- Coordinates: 35.4°N 62.0°W
- Diameter: 10 km
- Depth: Unknown
- Colongitude: 62° at sunrise
- Eponym: Karl F. Naumann

Naumann is a lunar impact crater located on the Oceanus Procellarum in the northwest sector of the Moon. It is a bowl-shaped, symmetrical crater with a relatively high-albedo rim. There are no notable impact craters overlaying the rim edge or the interior. The nearest named craters are Lichtenberg to the southwest and Nielsen to the southeast. Otherwise it is located in a region of lunar mare which is devoid of significant features.

== Satellite craters ==
By convention these features are identified on lunar maps by placing the letter on the side of the crater midpoint that is closest to Naumann.

| Naumann | Latitude | Longitude | Diameter |
|---|---|---|---|
| B | 37.4° N | 60.6° W | 10 km |
| G | 33.6° N | 60.7° W | 6 km |

== Bibliography ==
- Andersson, L. E.; Whitaker, E. A. (1982). NASA Catalogue of Lunar Nomenclature. NASA RP-1097.
- Blue, Jennifer (July 25, 2007). "Gazetteer of Planetary Nomenclature". USGS.
- Bussey, B.; Spudis, P. (2004). The Clementine Atlas of the Moon. New York: Cambridge University Press. ISBN 978-0-521-81528-4.
- Cocks, Elijah E.; Cocks, Josiah C. (1995). Who's Who on the Moon: A Biographical Dictionary of Lunar Nomenclature. Tudor Publishers. ISBN 978-0-936389-27-1.
- McDowell, Jonathan (July 15, 2007). "Lunar Nomenclature". Jonathan's Space Report. Archived from the original on 2012-02-08.
- Menzel, D. H.; Minnaert, M.; Levin, B.; Dollfus, A.; Bell, B. (1971). "Report on Lunar Nomenclature by the Working Group of Commission 17 of the IAU". Space Science Reviews. 12 (2): 136–186. Bibcode:1971SSRv...12..136M. doi:10.1007/BF00171763. S2CID 122125855.
- Moore, Patrick (2001). On the Moon. Sterling Publishing Co. ISBN 978-0-304-35469-6.
- Price, Fred W. (1988). The Moon Observer's Handbook. Cambridge University Press. ISBN 978-0-521-33500-3.
- Rükl, Antonín (1990). Atlas of the Moon. Kalmbach Books. ISBN 978-0-913135-17-4.
- Webb, Rev. T. W. (1962). Celestial Objects for Common Telescopes (6th revised ed.). Dover. ISBN 978-0-486-20917-3.
- Whitaker, Ewen A. (1999). Mapping and Naming the Moon. Cambridge University Press. ISBN 978-0-521-62248-6.
- Wlasuk, Peter T. (2000). Observing the Moon. Springer. ISBN 978-1-85233-193-1.
