= Werner Neumann (jazz musician) =

German jazz guitarist and music lecturer (born 1964)

Werner Neumann (born 13 August 1964 in Duisburg) is a German jazz guitarist and music lecturer.

== Life ==
Neumann grew up in Gelnhausen, where he took his first guitar lessons, before studying music at the University of Cologne. He then spent a year studying jazz guitar at the Musikhochschule Arnheim and finally studying jazz guitar at the Musikhochschule Köln. He took additional lessons with Pat Metheny, Attila Zoller, Mick Goodrick, Scott Henderson, Frank Gambale, Michael Brecker, Hal Galper, Adam Nussbaum, David Liebman and Robben Ford.

From 1990 to 1995 he taught at the Münchner Gitarreninstitut, until 1997 at the University of Mainz and until 2006 at the Musikhochschule Köln, as well as between 2003 and 2005 at the Universität der Künste Berlin. In 2005 he became a professor at the Hochschule für Musik und Theater in Leipzig, moving there in 2006.

Neumann has worked as sideman with artists such as Richie Beirach, Dennis Chambers, Keith Copeland, Yves Eigenrauch, John Goldsby, Dave King, Simon Nabatov, Dick Oats, Bill Ramsey, Ronny Verbiest and Jiggs Whigham.

He led the group Drei vom Rhein (with Helmuth Fass, Alex Vesper and Pit Hupperten); he, Heiko Jung and Daniel Splitt formed the group Little Sister, whilst Neumann, Stefan Locher, Kai Schönburg, Oleg Rovner, Per Winkler and Mr. T-Rox also formed the group Sooshee. Since 1998 Neumann has also been a member of the Franck Band (alongside Hinrich Franck, Hardy Fischötter and Claus Fischer) and the group Berns-Köbberling-Neumann (with Pepe Berns and Heinrich Köbberling). From 1988 to 2006 he was guitarist with Wolf Maahn. He has recorded over forty albums as band leader and sideman.

He has also worked as composer and guitarist on films such as Der Wixxer, Die Unschuld der Krähen and Runaway Horse. In 2001 he published the educational work Die Jazzmethode für Gitarre – Solo (Schott-Verlag).

== Discography ==
- Various Artists: Stadtgarten Series Vol. 6 (including Drei vom Rhein)
- Double You: Menschbilder
- Drei vom Rhein: Drei vom Rhein
- Drei vom Rhein: Starke Gesten
- Drei vom Rhein: Adventures in Guitarland
- Drei vom Rhein: Almaty gogo
- Drei vom Rhein: Sumo
- Werner Neumann Quartett: Canniou
- Drei vom Rhein: DvR plays Uncle Frank
- Little Sister: Secret Melody
