= Numan (disambiguation) =

Numan is a surname.

Numan may also refer to:

== Given name ==
- Numan Acar, Turkish-German actor and film producer
- Numan al-Samarrai
- Numan Bostan
- Numan Çürüksu (born 1984), Turkish footballer
- Numan Gumaa (1937–2014), Egyptian attorney and chairman of the liberal New Wafd Party
- Numan Kurdić
- Numan Kurtulmuş (born 1959), Turkish politician and academic
- Köprülü Numan Pasha (died 1719), grand vizier of the Ottoman Empire (1710–11)
- Numan Okumuş
- Numan Satimov, Uzbek mathematician
- Numan Salgado, Salvadoran politician, lawyer, and businessman
- Hüseyin Numan Menemencioğlu, Turkish diplomat and politician

== Other ==
- Numan (race), a fictional race of beings from the Phantasy Star series
- Numan Athletics, a 1993 arcade game by Namco
- Numan, Nigeria

== See also ==
- Nu'man, Arabic given name
- Naaman (disambiguation)
- Newman (disambiguation)
- Neuman
