= Ike Marsh =

English footballer

Personal information
- Full name: Isaac William Marsh
- Date of birth: 1 February 1877
- Place of birth: Burton-on-Trent, England
- Date of death: 1949 (aged 71–72)
- Position: Centre half

Senior career*
Years	Team	Apps	(Gls)
1893–1894	Nottingham Jardines Athletic		
1894–1895	Clifton Colliery		
1895–1896	Hucknall Portland		
1896	Burton Wanderers	0	(0)
1896	Northfleet		
1897–1898	West Herts		
1898	Gainsborough Trinity	1	(0)
1898–1899	Hucknall Portland		
1899–1900	Notts County	3	(0)
1900–1901	Newark Town		
1901–1903	Doncaster Rovers	33	(3)
1903–1904	Somercotes United		
1904–1905	Worksop Town		
1905–1906	Worksop North End		
1906–1907	Dinnington Main Colliery Welfare		
1908	Birchwood Colliery		
1908–1909	Denaby United		
1909–1910	Chesterfield Town		
1910	Denaby United		
Total		37	(3)
- * Club domestic league appearances and goals

Isaac William Marsh (1 February 1877 – 1949) was an English footballer who played in the Football League for Doncaster Rovers, Gainsborough Trinity and Notts County. Marsh scored Doncaster Rovers' first Football League hat-trick which came in a 4–1 win against Chesterfield Town on 11 January 1902.
