= Michael A. Neuman =

Canadian-born executive (born 1955)

Michael Neuman (born 1955) is a Canadian-born executive who has managed telecommunications and broadcast television companies in Canada, the United Kingdom, and the United States. He is the founder and CEO of WorldLinx Telecommunications Inc., and founder of MediaLinx which formed the ISP Sympatico. He was CEO of satellite TV provider Bell ExpressVu and acted as President of Bell Mobility where he joined forces with Sir Richard Branson to launch Virgin Mobile Canada. He was President of Fortune 300 company EchoStar, which operates DISH Network in the U.S., and CEO of British telecom outfit iaxis prior to its sale to Dynegy Inc., in 2000.

== Personal life ==
Neuman was born in Hamilton, Ontario. He graduated from the University of Western Ontario in London, Ontario in 1977 with a bachelor's degree in Political Science.

He is married with two children.

== Associated corporations ==
=== V Band ===
In 1984, Neuman founded and became managing director of telecom startup V Band PLC in the United Kingdom. The company sold and installed trading room telecom systems for financial institutions in London's Square Mile. The company was sold to Telephone Rentals PLC in 1987. Neuman joined the board of V Band Inc. in 1988 as Vice Chairman and was appointed CEO later that year.

=== WorldLinx ===
In the early 1990s, Neuman founded and became CEO of WorldLinx Telecommunications Inc. (a subsidiary of BCE Inc), a data communications company. On behalf of BCE, Neuman led the formation of the Beacon Initiative, a 10-year, $8 billion upgrade to Canada's fiber optic network. Under Neuman, WorldLinx also launched a subsidiary, MediaLinx, which in turn launched Sympatico.

=== ExpressVu / Bell ExpressVu ===
In 1994, Neuman formed and led a new satellite television business on behalf of a group of telecom and broadcast investors which became ExpressVu and later Bell ExpressVu, after becoming a wholly owned subsidiary of BCE. Under Neuman, ExpressVu distributed Canada's first national broadcast of High Definition programming, the country's first satellite internet service and the then-largest hockey programming line-up in the country, NHL Centre Ice. ExpressVu is now the third largest TV distributor in Canada. Neuman resigned from Bell ExpressVu in November 1999.

=== iaxis ===
In 1999, Neuman joined the British telecom firm iaxis as president and CEO with a mandate to build and operate a fiber optic network connecting the major capitals of Europe. iaxis NV was sold in 2000 to Dynegy Inc.

=== Teleglobe ===
In 2001 Neuman re-joined BCE as President Europe, Middle East and Africa of the European subsidiary of BCE's Teleglobe Inc., a provider of global telecom services.

=== Bell Mobility / Virgin Mobile ===
In 2002, Neuman assumed leadership of BCE's mobile phone operator Bell Mobility. In 2004, Neuman orchestrated the deal with Virgin Mobile to form a new, jointly owned property, Virgin Mobile Canada, launched in February 2005.

=== DISH Network ===
In 2005, Neuman was appointed president and COO of EchoStar Corporation, operator of the American satellite TV service provider DISH Network. He planned the marketing strategy of offering free satellite and television services to any town in the United States which renamed itself "Dish". A Texas town subsequently did so. Neuman resigned as President of EchoStar in February 2006.

=== Magna Entertainment ===
In 2007, Neuman became president of the horse racing company Magna Entertainment Corp, as the company's sixth president in seven years. Neuman resigned after five months, and the company filed for Chapter 11 bankruptcy protection in 2009.

=== Elevest Corporation ===
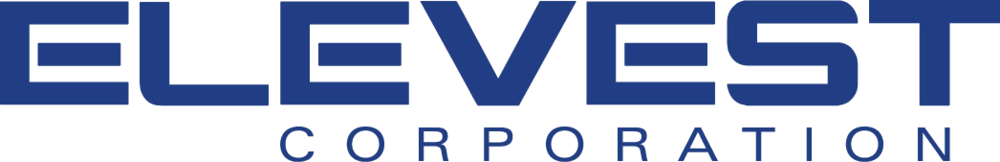
Elevest Corporation Logo

Neuman founded the privately held Elevest Corporation in 1995, a management consulting and venture capital firm.
