= Newman (disambiguation) =

Newman is a surname.

Newman may also refer to:

== Places ==
=== United States ===
- Newman, California
- Newman, Illinois
- Newman, Kansas
- Newman, Kentucky
- Newman, New Mexico
- Newman, Ohio
- Newman, Texas
- Newman Creek, a stream in Ohio
- Newman Grove, Nebraska
- Newman Township (disambiguation)

=== Other places ===
- Newman, Western Australia, Australia
- Newman Bay, a fjord in Greenland

== Arts and entertainment ==
- Newman (Seinfeld), a character on the U.S. program Seinfeld
- "Newman", a 2019 song by BloodPop

== Other uses ==
- Newman Club (rugby), an Argentine sports club
- Newman College (disambiguation)
- Newman University (disambiguation)
- Newman's, an American department store chain
- Newman's Own, an American food company
- Newmans Coach Lines, a New Zealand transport company
- Justice Newman (disambiguation)
- USS Newman (DE-205)
- USS Newman K. Perry (DD-883)

== See also ==
- New man (disambiguation)
- Numan (race), fictional characters, in the Phantasy Star series of video games
