= All Things New =

All Things New may refer to:

- All Things New (band), a Contemporary Christian band
  - All Things New (All Things New album), a 2013 album by the band
- All Things New (Steven Curtis Chapman album), a 2004 album by Steven Curtis Chapman
- All Things New (Rivers & Robots album), a 2014 album by Rivers & Robots
