= New men (disambiguation) =

"New men" refers to various socially upwardly mobile groups in England during the late Middle Ages.

New men may also refer to:

- Novus homo, a similar concept in Ancient Rome
- New Men (EP), by BTOB, 2016
- New Men (Image Comics), a 1990s comics series
- New Men (Marvel Comics), a fictional group of characters
- The New Men, a 1954 Strangers and Brothers novel by C. P. Snow

== See also ==
- The New Gentlemen (Les Nouveaux Messieurs), a 1929 French silent film directed by Jacques Feyder
- New man (disambiguation)
- The New Man (disambiguation)
