= Take Me Back =

Take Me Back may refer to:

== Albums ==
- Take Me Back (Andraé Crouch album), 1975, or the title song
- Take Me Back (Brenda Lee album), 1980
- Take Me Back, by Kim Wilson, 2020

== Songs ==
- "Take Me Back" (Imperials song), 1965
- "Take Me Back" (Noiseworks song), 1987
- "Take Me Back" (Tinchy Stryder song), 2009
- "Take Me Back", by All Things New from The Good News, 2015
- "Take Me Back", by Bonnie Tyler from Faster Than the Speed of Night, 1983
- "Take Me Back", by Bryan Adams from Cuts Like a Knife, 1983
- "Take Me Back", by Dolly Parton from Love Is Like a Butterfly, 1974
- "Take Me Back", by Erasure from I Say I Say I Say, 1994
- "Take Me Back", by Foster the People from Paradise State of Mind, 2024
- "Take Me Back", by Matoma from Hakuna Matoma, 2015
- "Take Me Back", by Me & My from Let the Love Go On, 1999
- "Take Me Back", by Michael Jackson from Forever, Michael, 1975
- "Take Me Back", by Peter Andre from Peter Andre, 1993
- "Take Me Back", by Story of the Year from In the Wake of Determination, 2005
- "Take Me Back", by Sybil from Doin' It Now!, 1993
- "Take Me Back", by Tracy Spencer, 1987
- "Take Me Back", by Van Morrison from Hymns to the Silence, 1991
- "Take Me Back", written by Irving Berlin, c. 1912–1916
