= Treaty of Montlouis =

1174 treaty ending the Revolt of 1173-74

The Treaty of Montlouis was an agreement made between Henry II of England and his sons which, alongside the Treaties of Falaise and Ivry, made peace with the opposing parties of the Revolt of 1173-74. The treaty was signed in Montlouis-sur-Loire on 30 September 1174.

== Background ==
War broke out between Henry II and his three eldest sons in 1173. Following the 1169 Treaty of Montmirail and the crowning of Henry's eldest son, Henry the Young King, in 1170, his sons had hoped they would begin to enjoy political power and autonomy from their father. The sons, however, grew increasingly frustrated as this did not materialise. In 1173, Henry II bequeathed the castles of Chinon, Loudun, and Mirabeau to his youngest son, John, despite them making up part of Henry the Younger's inheritance. This is often cited as the casus belli for the conflict, after which Henry the Younger retreated to the court of his father-in-law, Louis VII. There, he was encouraged to start the rebellion and was joined in doing so by his mother, Eleanor of Aquitaine; his brothers, Richard (later King of England and known as "the Lionheart") and Geoffrey; notable barons from England; and William I of Scotland.

The conflict concluded with a decisive victory for Henry II. William I and Eleanor were both captured and imprisoned. His sons, defeated, were forced to make peace with their father.

== The Treaty of Montlouis ==
The Treaty first set out to address the casus belli for the conflict. Having lost the conflict, Henry the Younger was forced to relinquish his claims to the three castles, which were returned to Henry II and later transferred to John.

To address the longer held grievances of his sons, Henry II made notable concessions of his own. To his eldest son, he granted an annuity of £15,000 (Angevin pounds) alongside two castles in Normandy. To Richard, he gave two castles and half the revenues of Poitou. Geoffrey was given half the revenues of the Duchy of Brittany and the promise that he would receive the full revenues after his marriage with Constance, Duchess of Brittany, was confirmed.

The sons were each made to pay homage to their father to ensure their loyalty moving forward. Both Henry II and Henry the Younger also agreed not to condemn any of the barons who had allied themselves to the other.

== Aftermath ==
The Treaty brought a temporary end to open conflict within the Angevin dynasty, but failed to resolve the underlying tensions between Henry II and his sons. Relations detiorated in the following years and conflict broke out again in 1183.
