= New Man (All Things New song) =

Single by All Things New

from the album All Things New
- Released: February 8, 2013
- Genre: CCM, Americana, folk, Southern pop
- Length: 4:00
- Label: BEC Recordings
- Songwriter(s): All Things New, Maks Gabriel, Hillary McBride
- Producer(s): Casey Brown, Jonathan Smith

"New Man" is a song by American CCM band All Things New. It was released on February 8, 2013, as the first single from their debut studio album, All Things New (2013).

== Background ==
The song was co-written by All Things New, Maks Gabriel and Hillary McBride, and produced by Casey Brown and Jonathan Smith.

== Release ==
"New Man" was digitally released as the lead single from All Things New on February 8, 2013.

== Music video ==
The band has made a music video of the song.

== Weekly charts ==
Charts (2013)	Peak position
Billboard Christian AC Indicator	18
Billboard Hot Christian AC	28
Billboard Hot Christian Songs	25
