= Rivers & Robots =

U.K. musical group

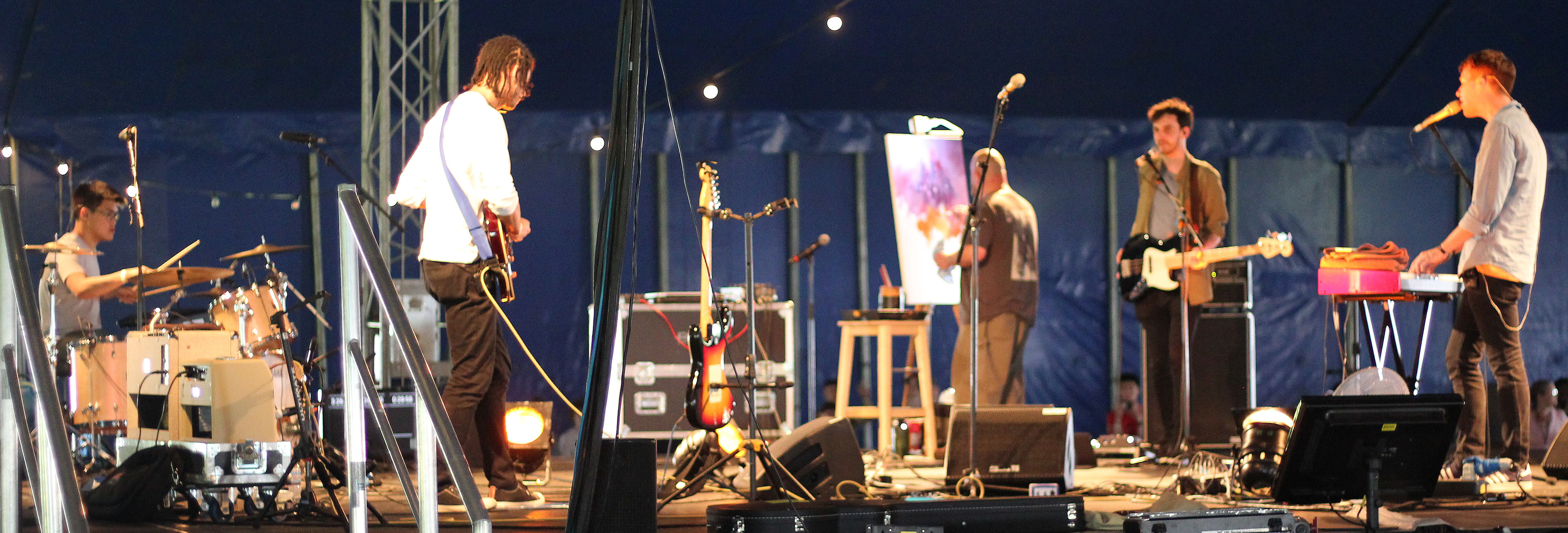
- Rivers & Robots performing at the Big Church Day Out Festival at Wiston, West Sussex in 2018

Background information
- Origin: Salford, Greater Manchester, N.W. England
- Genres: Worship, electronica, electronic rock, techno, folk
- Years active: 2010—2021(on hiatus)
- Past members: Jonathan Ogden; Nathan Stirling; Caleb Choo; Philip Shibata; Kelani Koyejo; David Hailes
- Website: riversandrobots.com

Rivers & Robots were an English worship band from Salford, England. The group formed in 2010, and released five independently-made studio albums.

== Background ==
They were formed by Jonathan Ogden, lead vocalist, when he started recording under the name in 2010 in City of Salford, Greater Manchester, North West England. The group members who joined him were guitarist, David Hailes, bassist, Nathan Stirling, and drummer, Kelani Koyejo. Kelani left the group in February 2016 and was replaced by Caleb Choo in September 2017. David also decided to leave the band in August 2017, so the band was searching for a new guitarist for a while. In October 2018 Rivers and Robots announced the joining of Philip Shibata as guitarist.

== Music history ==
The band started musical recording in 2010, with their first album, The Great Light, that was released on 12 August 2011. Their subsequent album, Take Everything, was released on 20 July 2012. They released an extended play, Rivers & Robots, in 2013. Their third album, All Things New, was released on 8 July 2014. Their fourth studio album, The Eternal Son, was released on 20 May 2016, by Set Sail Records. Their fifth and last to date album, Discovery, was released on 14 September 2018, by Running Club Records and was met with critical acclaim.

In early 2021, Rivers and Robots officially announced a hiatus for the band on their website.

« (...) We’ve learnt to recognise the times we’re sailing with the wind of God’s power and blessing, and to know when we’re sailing against it. And so, after much prayer and conversation, we believe the season is changing again and that it’s time for Rivers & Robots to take a hiatus. This isn’t a break-up, we’re all still friends and love and support each other just as much as ever. But after 10 years of Rivers & Robots as a project, we feel like it’s time to take a break from recording and touring for the foreseeable future. This is never an easy decision to make, and we know it will be sad news for many of our listeners. (...) » (from riversandrobots.com)

== Discography ==
=== Studio albums ===
List of albums, with selected chart positions
Title	Album details	Peak chart positions
Title	Album details	UK C&G
The Great Light	Released: 12 August 2011; Label: Independent; Formats: CD, digital download, streamed audio	—
Take Everything	Released: 20 July 2012; Label: Come&Live!; Formats: CD, digital download, streamed audio	—
All Things New	Released: 8 July 2014; Label: Come&Live!; Formats: CD, digital download, streamed audio	—
The Eternal Son	Released: 20 May 2016; Label: Set Sail Records; Formats: CD, digital download, LP, streamed audio	—
Discovery	Released: 14 September 2018; Label: Running Club Records; Formats: CD, digital download, LP, streamed audio	15

=== Instrumental albums ===
List of albums, with selected chart positions
Title	Album details	Peak chart positions
Title	Album details	UK C&G
Still Vol. 1	Released: 13 January 2017; Label: Integrity; Formats: CD, digital download, LP, streamed audio	14

EPs

- Rivers & Robots (2013)
