= New man =

New Man may refer to:

== Politics ==
- New Man (utopian concept)
  - New Cuban man, archetype of the ideal Cuban communist
  - New Soviet man, archetype of the ideal Soviet communist
- New Man (gender stereotype), archetype of male behaviour, typically narcissistic and/or pro-feminist, widely discussed in UK mass media in the late 1980s and 1990s
- Novus homo, Latin term for a man who was first in his family to serve in the Roman Senate

== Arts and entertainment ==
- "New Man" (All Things New song), 2013
- "New Man" (Ed Sheeran song), 2017
- New Man (Christian magazine), American Christian men's magazine
- "New Man", the pilot episode of the British sitcom PhoneShop
- New Man (clothing), French clothing retailer

== See also ==
- "A New Man", an episode of Buffy the Vampire Slayer
- The New Man (disambiguation)
- Superman (disambiguation)
- Newman (disambiguation)
