= Judge Newman =

Judge Newman may refer to:

- Alfred Newman (judge) (1834–1898), judge of the Wisconsin Circuit Court and the Wisconsin Supreme Court
- Bernard Newman (judge) (1907–1999), judge of the United States Court of International Trade
- Charles Newman (judge), British judge and member of the Judicial Appointments Commission
- Clifton Newman (born 1951), judge of the South Carolina Circuit court
- Jon O. Newman (born 1932), judge of the United States Court of Appeals for the Second Circuit
- Jonathan Uhry Newman (1927–1991), judge of the Oregon Court of Appeals
- Michael J. Newman (born 1960), judge of the United States District Court for the Southern District of Ohio
- Pauline Newman (born 1927), judge of the United States Court of Appeals for the Federal Circuit
- Theodore R. Newman Jr. (born 1934), first black chief judge of the District of Columbia Court of Appeals
- William Truslow Newman (1843–1920), judge of the United States District Court for the Northern District of Georgia

== See also ==
- Justice Newman (disambiguation)
