= Newman, Ohio =

Unincorporated community in Ohio, U.S.

Coordinates: 40°49′51″N 81°33′50″W

Newman, Ohio, USA
- Unincorporated Community
- Interactive map of Newman, Ohio, USA
- Elevation: 344 m (1,129 ft)

Newman is an unincorporated community in Stark County, in the U.S. state of Ohio.

== History ==
A post office called Newman was established in 1889, and remained in operation until 1906. The community takes its name from nearby Newman Creek.
