= The Good News (album) =

Studio album by All Things New
- Released: September 25, 2015
- Genre: Contemporary Christian music, folk rock
- Length: 33:12
- Label: BEC

All Things New chronology
All Things New (2013)	The Good News (2015)

The Good News is the second studio album by All Things New. BEC Recordings released the album on September 25, 2015.

== Critical reception ==
Professional ratings
Review scores
Source	Rating
365 Days of Inspiring Media	4/5 stars
CCM Magazine	3/5 stars
The Christian Beat	4.5/5 stars
Jesus Freak Hideout	2.5/5 stars
New Release Today	3.5/5 stars

Awarding the album three stars from CCM Magazine, Matt Conner states, "It's easy to hear a band back in touch with their reasons for singing in the first place, when presented with straightforward truths couched in sing-along melodies." Jonathan J. Francesco, giving the album three and a half stars at New Release Today, writes, "All Things New is a talented group and has created an enjoyable, accessible record that is truly fun and uplifting. It might not break new musical or lyrical ground, but it satisfies...All in all The Good News is a success". Rating the album two and a half stars for Jesus Freak Hideout, Emmalee Manes says, "The Good News seems to lose the interesting flavor the band displayed in their debut album." Chris Major, indicating in a four and a half star review by The Christian Beat, describes, "All Things New conveys those truths powerfully and confidently, holding nothing back while still leaving room for God’s Word to resonate." Signaling in a four star review by 365 Days of Inspiring Media, Joshua Andre responds, "The Good News...makes us admire the band for who they are, a worship band eager to share the love of God with everyone they meet!"

== Track listing ==
No.	Title	Length
1.	"You Love Me for Me"	2:53
2.	"I'll Be"	2:55
3.	"Can't Hold Me Down"	3:38
4.	"Believe"	3:27
5.	"Take Me Back"	2:50
6.	"We Are the Free"	3:25
7.	"Who We Are"	3:43
8.	"All Because You Love Me"	3:26
9.	"Changed"	3:36
10.	"The Good News"	3:19
Total length:		33:12
