= All Things New (Rivers & Robots album) =

Studio album by Rivers & Robots
- Released: 8 July 2014
- Genre: Worship, CCM, CEDM, Christian rock, electronica, folk, alternative rock, baroque pop, folk rock, indie folk, indie pop, indie rock
- Length: 50:25

All Things New is the third studio album from Rivers & Robots. They released the album on 8 July 2014.

== Critical reception ==
Professional ratings
Review scores
Source	Rating
Cross Rhythms	10/10 squares
Louder Than the Music	4.5/5 stars
New Release Today	3/5 stars
Worship Leader	4/5 stars

Awarding the album four stars at Worship Leader, Jeremy Armstrong states, "Rivers & Robots is spare folky guitar and ambient/electronic rock that harmonizes as good as any sweet-heart band you'll hear pouring out of college dorm rooms these days." Lins Honeyman, rating the album a ten out of ten for Cross Rhythms, writes, "Ogden's quietly inventive songwriting and wistful vocal delivery coming as standard as well as his ability to offer up an innately worshipful piece of work that refreshingly doesn't sound at all like worship music." Giving the album three stars from New Release Today, Jonathan J. Francesco, says, "Rivers & Robots know who they have set out to become, and this album does a solid job of defining them." Philip Aldis, indicating in a four and a half star review by Louder Than the Music, describes, "It’s lush. It’s beautiful. It’s original."

== Track listing ==
No.	Title	Length
1.	"We Have Overcome"	4:24
2.	"Perfect Love"	4:38
3.	"White as Snow"	3:17
4.	"Fall Down"	4:32
5.	"Arise"	4:30
6.	"You Hear Me"	4:59
7.	"In the Family"	4:39
8.	"Keep My Fire Burning"	3:47
9.	"Shepherd of My Soul"	5:46
10.	"Light Will Dawn"	3:31
11.	"Voice That Stills the Raging Sea"	6:22
Total length:		50:25
