= Justice Newman =

Justice Newman may refer to:

- Alfred Newman (judge) (1834–1898), associate justice of the Wisconsin Supreme Court
- Frank C. Newman (1917–1996), associate justice of the Supreme Court of California
- Oscar W. Newman (1867–1928), associate justice of the Ohio Supreme Court
- Sandra Schultz Newman (born 1938), associate justice of the Pennsylvania Supreme Court

== See also ==
- Linda K. Neuman (fl. 1980s–2000s), associate justice of the Iowa Supreme Court
- William A. Neumann (born 1944), associate justice of the North Dakota Supreme Court
- Judge Newman (disambiguation)
