= The New Man =

The New Man may refer to:

- The New Man (film), 2007 Swedish film
- The New Man (Upstairs, Downstairs), episode of the British television series Upstairs, Downstairs
- Der Neue Mensch, a sculpture by German artist Otto Freundlich
- The New Man, 1900 German comedy film

== See also ==
- New man (disambiguation)
