= Newman College =

Newman College may refer to:

- Newman College, Perth, Australia
- Newman College, Melbourne, Australia
- Newman College, Thodupuzha, India
- Newman Catholic College, London, England
- Newman College, Dublin, former private college in Dublin, Ireland

== See also ==
- Newman University (disambiguation)
