= All Things New (All Things New album) =

Studio album by All Things New
- Released: April 9, 2013
- Genre: Contemporary Christian music, Americana
- Length: 38:45
- Label: BEC
- Producer: Casey Brown, Jonathan Smith

All Things New chronology
Overcome (2011)	All Things New (2013)	The Good News (2015)

Singles from All Things New
- 1. "New Man" Released: February 8, 2013

All Things New is the first studio album by contemporary Christian music band All Things New, released on April 9, 2013, by BEC Recordings. Casey Brown and Jonathan Smith produced the album.

== Music and lyrics ==
On the subject of musicality, Indie Vision Music's Jonathan Andre found that "while some of the album may seem a little indifferent musically and may possibly disinterest some listeners who may be more inclined to listen to more of a rock music genre". At Worship Leader, Andrea Hunter agreed with that saying "The poppy production sometimes contains and neutralizes the passion and personality." Roger Gelwicks of Jesus Freak Hideout told that "combining simple truths and simple instrumentation, the album doesn't make for the deepest of listens, and unfortunately, that has a lasting impact on All Things New's overall appeal." To this, Gelwicks noted "All Things New still need quite a bit of artistic growth, and they severely sell themselves short with a sorely unexciting debut." However, Louder Than the Music' Jono Davies affirmed that "the album has a very gentle flow to it, this doesn't mean it's middle of the road rock. These songs will never fall into the category of background music. Each song has a great melody and a great sound." Cross Rhythms' Stephen Curry noted that the album contains "distinctive melodies and strong vocals shine through on each track." So, Matt Conner of CCM Magazine told that even though "they're green at this point, the Florida act is a safe bet for breakout status."

With respect to lyrics, Sarah Fine of New Release Tuesday stated that the album "is filled with ten lyrically meaty cuts." At Worship Leader, Andre Hunter seconded that with writing that the release has "heartfelt, relatable lyrics and conversational quality—with plenty of scriptural ties—translate life with God into accessible reality." In addition, Davies found that "Each song has a great melody to it and for me, melody is what stands a good track out from an ordinary one. The production of the album is brilliant and I'm sure we will see more and more of this band in the future." However, Christian Music Zine's Joshua Andre felt that "if the first half of the album is a 5/5 (and it is close to that), then the last 5 tracks are a step down just a bit. Musically and lyrically they are good, yet lack the punch of the opening tracks. Still some great reminders and lessons learned when I listen to tracks 6-10."

In the thematic area, New Release Tuesday's Fine assessed that the album deals with "confusion, hope, healing and surrender are deeply embedded, and you'll find yourself as a listener both inspired to praise and encouraged to press deeper into God." Andre of Christian Music Zine told that "to describe the ten songs in one phrase would be 'contemporary pop with a distinct edge and rocky flavour in a few tracks'; and every track points to Jesus as the answer for healing our brokenness and our pains." At Cross Rhythms, Curry touched on that the band does "indeed" have a "pop sound gives a lively and upbeat offering despite tackling some difficult subjects but always focusing on the One who can help us in our trials."

== Critical reception ==
Professional ratings
Review scores
Source	Rating
CCM Magazine	4/5 stars
Christian Music Zine	4.25/5
Cross Rhythms	9/10 squares
Indie Vision Music	3/5 stars
Jesus Freak Hideout	2.5/5 stars
Louder Than the Music	4/5 stars
New Release Tuesday	4.5/5 stars
Worship Leader	3.5/5 stars

All Things New has received mostly favorable reviews from the five critics. At CCM Magazine, Matt Conner felt that the release only cemented them as "a band destined for long-term success and broad spiritual impact." Christian Music Zine's Andre wrote said that "for a debut album this is good, and even though the song order may have needed tweaking for the album to have an even stronger impact", which he called an "encouraging" release. Stephen Curry of Cross Rhythms called this "an excellent debut from the CCM newcomers." At Indie Vision Music, Andre found that the album "is a great choice to listen to if you enjoy contemporary pop with a southern-style acoustic edge." Gelwicks of Jesus Freak Hideout called it "just a modest start" because "All Things New critically lacks in numerous areas." New Release Tuesday's Fine proclaimed that "All Things New is a band who stands apart as a group who does it splendidly and with real authenticity", yet the effort is "stylistically, while executed commendably, it doesn't stray far from its folksy roots, and I'd enjoy seeing the addition of some grittier elements next go-around", which she closed foreshadowing that the band has a "very sunny forecast." At Worship Leader, Hunter noticed that with "a more revealing and lyrically-tuned production, a little more melodic variation and strength and this band will be unstoppable", and so Hunter believed that this "debut that anticipates a great future." Lastly, Louder Than the Music's Jono Davies called "this is a truly great debut from the mid-tempo rock band", and said that the album "has some great tracks to get your teeth into."

== Commercial performance ==
On April 27, 2013, the album was the fifth most sold Billboard Top Heatseekers album. Plus, it was the No. 14 most sold Christian Album in the United States.

== Track listing ==
No.	Title	Writer(s)	Length
1.	"Washed Over Me"	All Things New, Casey Brown, Jonathan Smith	3:44
2.	"In Your Reach"	All Things New, Brown, Smith	3:32
3.	"Holding On"	All Things New, Bryan Brown, Hillary McBride	5:21
4.	"New Man"	All Things New, Maks Gabriel, McBride	4:00
5.	"Borderline"	Matt Hammitt, Jason Ingram	3:39
6.	"Lead Me Home"	All Things New, Brown	3:27
7.	"Greater Things"	All Things New, Mia Fieldes, Smith	3:48
8.	"Keep Me on My Knees"	All Things New, Brown, Ingram, Smith	4:07
9.	"Use Me"	All Things New, Chuck Butler, Tony Wood	3:12
10.	"You Came for Me"	All Things New, Nick DePartee	3:55
Total length:			38:45

== Charts ==
Chart (2013)	Peak position
US Top Christian Albums (Billboard)	14
US Top Heatseekers (Billboard)	5
