= Newman University =

Newman University may refer to:

- Birmingham Newman University, England
- Newman University (Kansas), a Catholic liberal arts university in Wichita, Kansas, United States

== See also ==
- Newman College (disambiguation)
