= Newman Township =

Newman Township may refer to:

- Newman Township, Douglas County, Illinois
- Newman Township, Saunders County, Nebraska
- Newman Township, Ward County, North Dakota, in Ward County, North Dakota
