= Newman Creek =

Stream in Ohio

Coordinates: 40°48′30″N 81°31′41″W

Location
- Country: United States
- State: Ohio

Newman Creek is a stream in the U.S. state of Ohio.

Newman Creek has the name of Jacob Newman, a government surveyor.

== See also ==
- List of rivers of Ohio
