= Angevin pound =

The Angevin pound was "the ordinary standard of the currency in the continental possessions (12th-century ) of the early Plantagenets" Roger of Hoveden wrote that its value was set at about one-fourth of an English pound by an ordinance of Richard the First.
