= New men =

Specific group of people in England during the Tudor period

New Men is a term referring to various upwardly mobile groups in premodern England, particularly under the dynasties of Lancaster, York and Tudor (1399–1603). The term may refer to new aristocracy, enriched gentry, or middle-class professionals who held important positions in government, most notably during the reign of Henry VII.

In the Late Middle Ages, the continuously expanding economy had always afforded some space for the betterment of ambitious commoners, but they were traditionally more able to accomplish this within the ecclesiastical rather than the secular hierarchy. Heavy losses taken by the ruling classes in the 15th century's Wars of the Roses were followed in the 16th century by accelerating economic growth and the English Reformation, which made available many administrative roles formerly filled by clergy and much wealth formerly held by monasteries. Many opportunities for upward mobility thus became available at the top of society, for those with the ambition and skill to take advantage.

== Administrators ==
These New Men were most usually lawyers, clerics and financial administrators who had come to the notice of the king and had been granted ministerial positions because of their own skills rather than because of a noble background. Common examples of new men are John Morton, Richard Foxe and Reginald Bray. Cardinal Thomas Wolsey could be considered a New Man, although by the time of his rise to power new men were not so new and were in fact becoming the norm within government.

New Men were first used in order to ensure the aristocracy were not allowed to become over-mighty, by distributing positions to people with little money, land or influence. This was in many respects a success, as it increased efficiency within government by the use of competent ministers and lessened the previous policy bias towards the nobility. However, many New Men used the influence they gained to secure new lands and great wealth and were essentially thought to be corrupt. Men like Edmund Dudley and Richard Empson were resented by both the nobles and the general population for the harsh taxes they collected uncompromisingly. This led to their execution on dubious charges of treason.

The existence of new men has been disputed by several historians, who feel that middle-class professionals have always been a part of government throughout British history. Other historians have claimed that the use of new men, rather than being invented by the British kings, was borrowed from the French monarchs' tendency to use the middle classes in government. However, it is commonly agreed that there was a sudden rise in this type of administrator in government towards the end of the 15th century and this, rather than being a paradigm shift, occurred over a sustained period of time.

== See also ==
- Novus homo, a similar concept in the Roman Republic
