= All Things New (band) =

American Christian pop band (2008–??)

- Origin: Deltona, Florida
- Genres: Contemporary Christian, Americana, Folk, Southern pop
- Years active: 2008–2016
- Label: BEC
- Members: Garrett Todd Hornbuckle; Jeffrey Dale Stein; Joshua Anthony Schou; Luke Stephen Wycuff
- Website: allthingsnewband.com (defunct)

All Things New is a Christian Contemporary-Americana-Folk-Southern pop band from Deltona, Florida. They are on the BEC Recordings label.

== Background ==
All Things New is from Deltona, Florida. As of 2013, the members were:

- Garrett Todd Hornbuckle - Vocals
- Jeffrey Dale "Jeff" Stein - Guitar, Vocals
- Joshua Anthony Schou - Bass
- Luke Stephen Wycuff - Drums

== Music ==
=== EP's ===
The band released an EP called "Seek the Love" in 2009. The band also released an EP that was called Overcome in 2011, which was done independently.

=== All Things New ===
Their first full-length studio album was released on April 9, 2013 -- All Things New, which was with BEC Recordings, and was produced by Casey Brown and Jonathan Smith.

== Discography ==
=== Album ===
Year	Album	Peak chart positions	
Year	Album	Top Christian	Top Heatseekers
2013	All Things New: Released: April 9, 2013; Label: BEC; Format: CD, Digital download	14	5
2015	The Good News: Released: September 25, 2015; Label: BEC; Format: CD, Digital download	—	—
