= Pierre-Adrien Toulorge =

French Catholic priest and martyr (1757–1793)

Blessed Pierre-Adrien Toulorge O. Praem.

Priest
- Born: 4 May 1757; Muneville-le-Bingard, Manche, Kingdom of France
- Died: 13 October 1793 (aged 36); Coutances, Manche, French First Republic
- Venerated in: Roman Catholic Church
- Beatified: 29 April 2012, Cathedral of Notre-Dame, Coutances, France by Cardinal Angelo Amato
- Feast: 13 October
- Attributes: White habit; Palm
- Patronage: Persecuted Christians

Pierre-Adrien Toulorge (4 May 1757 – 13 October 1793) was a French Roman Catholic priest and a professed member of the Premonstratensians and was killed during the French Revolution - he also remained in hiding for most of the revolution, celebrated secret masses and administered the sacraments in secret.

Toulorge was beatified on 29 April 2012 after Pope Benedict XVI confirmed that the late priest was killed "in odium fidei" ('in hatred of the faith'). Cardinal Angelo Amato presided over the celebration on the pope's behalf in Coutances Cathedral.

== Life ==
=== Childhood and priesthood ===
Pierre-Adrien Toulorge was born in the Kingdom of France on 4 May 1757 as the third child to Julien Toulorge and Julienne Hamel. His parents married on 9 November 1747. He was baptized mere hours after his birth by the parish curate Le Royer. He had at least one brother and one sister. His mother died on 8 May 1757 (and was buried in a church the next day) and in 1861 his father remarried to the widowed Marie Duprey. His father died on 31 March 1782.

The assistant parish priest noticed his aspirations to enter the priesthood and took Toulorge under his wing and instructed him in Latin. He was later sent to school for his initial education. Toulorge was admitted to his studies for the priesthood - that the Eudists oversaw - where his superior was Jacques-François Lefranc. He underwent philosophical studies in 1777 and theological studies from 1778 until 1782. Toulorge received the tonsure and the minor orders on 12 June 1778 while being made a subdeacon on 23 September 1780 and being elevated to the diaconate on 8 May 1871. He was ordained as a priest in June 1782 and was made an assistant curate in Doville at the beginning of 1783. He often went to the Norbertine convent in Blanchelande and asked the prior to be admitted into the Premonstratensians; he commenced his novitiate in Beuport and in June 1788 returned to Blanchelande where he made his profession.

=== The Revolution ===
In 1790 officials during the French Revolution suppressed their branch of the order and he left on 11 October to live in a neighboring farm belonging to the Le Sens in La Cour until 1791. But he made a grave error in judgment: the banishment law affected him but he nevertheless obtained travelling papers and on 12 September 1791 travelled to the island of Jersey where he joined over 500 priests from the Coutances diocese where he lived a precarious existence of a penniless exile for five weeks. The error in judgment materialized when a confrere pointed out to him that leaving for the island painted him as a traitor to the revolution. Upon hearing this he rushed back to the mainland as soon as he could and hoped that his absence would not be noticed - he landed in secret at a beach in Cotentin and went underground from November 1792 until September 1793. He spent three weeks after his immediate return with his pastor cousin Jean-Nicolas Toulorge. He spent that time in hiding from place to place in disguise and he both administered the sacraments in secret and celebrated Mass in homes in private. Masses were celebrated with makeshift vestments while he copied from the Roman Missal in order to celebrate Mass.

=== Arrest and trial ===
On the evening of 2 September 1793 - close to the village of Saint-Nicolas-de-Pierrepont - a woman saw a man emerge from a thicket and invited him into her home and lit a fire for him; Toulorge revealed himself to the woman who then revealed herself to be the Benedictine nun Sister Saint-Paul and Toulorge accepted her invitation to spend the night at the house. The nun - the next morning - led Toulorge out in disguise as a woman to the home of her friend Marotte Fosse thinking he would be much safer there. But workers along the path - seeing an unfamiliar woman - noticed his men's stockings and shoes and so followed the two to Marotte's door and went to inform the authorities. Toulorge rested in the attic of the home when three guards knocked on the door so hard the door itself shook: "Open in the name of the law!" Toulorge froze as a guard bought Fosse from work to open the door. The house was ransacked as the priest hid under bundles of flax and he managed to elude bayonets that stabbed the piles. The soldiers were about to leave muttering to themselves when one went back and noticed the priest coming out of his hiding place. Toulorge was arrested on the spot and all he had with him - such as his vestments - were seized.

On 4 September 1793 he was taken to the director of the Carentan district to be put on trial and hid the fact that he had left the mainland in order to avoid the death sentence. Commissioner Le Canut for the prosecution hoped to get Toulorge to contradict himself and asked him: "Have you ever - at this time or at any other - gone to Jersey or to any other foreign land?" to which the priest replied: "No". Le Canut instead fabricated the fact that a priest he interrogated had said he had seen Toulorge on the island which prompted Toulorge to state: "I have never left French soil and if others have told you I have they are either mistaken or crazy. Instead the prosecution showed him the seized objects from the Fosse home and the priest admitted to them belonging to him; the uncertain judges decided to send him to the departmental court in Coutances. In order to save his own life he continued to refuse mentioning that he left the mainland though when he returned to prison he felt a sense of guilt which prompted in him the desire to tell the truth. At dawn on 8 September 1793 he confessed the truth and - despite great exhaustion - appeared on 22 September before an administrative commission where he was interrogated on his trip to the island.

The priest was then sent to a criminal court that the Jacobin judge Gilbert-François Loisel presided over and the judge tried to save Toulorge's life after suggesting that the priest retract his confession and allude to mentioning he spent time someplace in France. Records of 12 October 1793 - when the death sentence was handed down - described aspects of the trial. Toulorge exclaimed "Deo Gratias" when the verdict was handed down and people around him as he was escorted back to prison believe he had been acquitted. When the evening came he dined and then went to make a confession and later wrote three letters - one to his brother. He returned to the cell he shared with fellow prisoners when one asked: "So what's the news?" and he said: "Good news - my case was decided in my favor!" leading to his companions believing he was acquitted and would soon be set free. However he was quick to reveal that the death sentence without appeal was the decision made and the happiness turned to sadness as Sister Saint-Paul - who was also arrested around the same time he was - wept which prompted the priest to tell her: "Madame - the tears you are shedding are unworthy of me ... Let us show that faith is victorious over torture and open a path of Heaven amidst the final efforts of hell".

=== Death ===
Toulorge asked for his hair to be cut and his beard to be shaved for his execution. He was present with his companions and stopped before the canticle for compline and said: "Soon I will sing this thanksgiving canticle in Heaven". He blessed his companions when the authorities arrived and he travelled to the guillotine on foot and spoke for the last time: "My God I place my soul in Your hands. I ask that You reestablish and preserve Your Holy Church. I beg You to forgive my enemies." He was executed at 2:00pm and the executioner grabbed the head by the hair and showed it to the crowds. Sister Saint-Paul was acquitted and survived the Terror.

His remains were dumped in a mass grave. His face was uncovered and faced west. He was reburied in 1804.

He is a relative of Father Adrien Toulorge (1882-1916).

== Beatification ==
The beatification process opened in an informative process in 1922 that halted in 1928 due to interruptions that rendered the cause inactive until he was made a Servant of God under Pope John Paul II on 24 April 1995 when the Congregation for the Causes of Saints gave the "nihil obstat" ('nothing against') to the cause; the diocesan process spanned from 1 December 1995 until 29 July 1996 and received C.C.S. validation on 8 May 1998.

The Positio dossier was sent to the C.C.S. in Rome in 1999 and a board of historians met and approved the cause on 5 December 2000 while deeming no historical obstacles existed in opposition to the cause; theologians voiced their approval on 13 July 2010 while the C.C.S. also voted in favor of the cause on 1 March 2011. Pope Benedict XVI confirmed that Toulorge died in hatred of his faith on 2 April 2011 which would pave the path for his beatification.

Cardinal Angelo Amato presided over the beatification on the behalf of Benedict XVI on 29 April 2012 in the Coutances Cathedral.

The current postulator for this cause is the Rev. Gabriel Wolf.
