= Cour =

Surname disambiguation

Cour is a surname. Notable people with the name include:

- Ajeet Cour (born 1934), Indian writer
- Glenys Cour (born 1924), Welsh artist
- Pierre Cour (1924–1995), French songwriter

== See also ==
- Coursera (NYSE: COUR), American online education company
- Cours (disambiguation)
- La Cour, a surname
- De la Cour, a surname
