= Richard l'Evêque =

French theologian

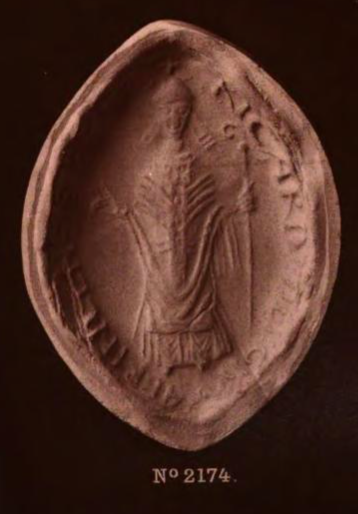
Richard (bishop of Avranches)

Richard l'Evêque (Richard de Coutances) (died 1181) was a French theologian and early scholastic philosopher, a friend of Robert de Torigni and a disseminator of Aristotle, in the translations of James of Venice. He became bishop of Avranches.

He is known largely through the writings of John of Salisbury, his pupil in Paris. Richard was himself a student of Bernard of Chartres. He was considered a very learned scholar.

He was archdeacon of Coutances, and became bishop at Avranches around 1170. In 1172 Avranches Cathedral was the scene of the ceremony on 21 May marking the compromise of Avranches, the reconciliation of Henry II of England with the Catholic Church after the murder of Thomas Becket.
