= Delecour =

Delecour is a French surname. Notable people with the surname include:

- François Delecour (born 1962), French rally driver
- Jocelyn Delecour (born 1935), French sprinter

== See also ==
- De la Cour
