= Maugis of Avranches =

Maugis was a Catholic cleric who bishop of Avranches in what is today France from 1017 to 1022.

Records show that Maugis initiated the construction of the cathedral on 1125. He appears as witness in 10 charters.

Mauguis died in 1026.

== Sources ==
- Richard Allen, "The Norman Episcopate 989-1110" (2009), PhD thesis.
- Recueil des actes des ducs de Normandie de 911 à 1066, ed. M.Faroux (Caen, 1961)
