= Michael of Avranches =

Michael of Avranches was bishop of Avranches from 1068 to 1094. He was an Italian churchman, about whom very little is known before he became a bishop, only that he was a ducal chaplain of William II. According to Orderic Vitalis, he was 'a man of considerable learning and piety'.

He was involved in the foundation of three priories within his diocese. He was present in 1082 when the church of Notre-Dame de Mortain was given to the abbey of Marmoutier and subsequently turned into a priory. He approved, in 1084, the foundation of Saint-Hilaire du Harcouët. Finally, in 1091, he confirmed the foundation of the priory of Saint-James de Sacey.

Up to 1088, he was quite involved in the duchy's affairs, helping in the reconciliation between the archbishop of Rouen and the abbey of St.Ouen in 1073, and witnessing the foundation of a priory outside his diocese (Saint-Marie du Rocher, in 1082).

After the failed rebellion of 1088, Robert Curthose granted the Cotentin and the Avranchin to Henry Beauclerc, the future Henry I of England, for 3000 pounds. Michael apparently accepted the agreement, unlike his warlike colleague the bishop of Coutances, Geoffrey de Montbray. This event seems to mark the end of Michael's involvement in ducal affairs, and a cooling off of his relationship to both Robert and Henry. For example, for a judgement he secured in 1091 relative to the bishopric's right to the Forest of Vievre against William of Breteuil, he went to the court of the archbishop of Rouen, and not to the ducal court or the court of his overlord Henry Beauclerc. Moreover, his last recorded public appearance in 1093 was at the funeral of Geoffrey de Montbray, a well known enemy of Henry.
