= Ntshepe Tsekere Bopape =

South African multi-disciplinary artist, DJ, and producer

Ntshepe Tsekere Bopape (also known as Mo Laudi) is a South African multi-disciplinary artist, curator, writer, composer, music producer and DJ, based between Paris and Johannesburg. Since 2021, he has been a research fellow at the Africa Open Institute for Music, Research and Innovation (AOI) at Stellenbosch University.

As early as 2000, Mo Laudi organised South African-themed parties in London and later in Paris, focusing on electronic music genres such as South African house music, kwaito, deep house, afro house, as well as amapiano, gqom and shangaan electro. As a composer and DJ, he has produced official remixes for artists including Calypso Rose (Calypso Queen, 2017), Flavia Coehlo (Por Cima, 2017), Elida Almeida and Flavia Coehlo (Sou Free, 2018), Philippe Cohen Solal (AfroBolero, 2019), as well as EPs such as Avant Garde Club Music (2015), Paris Afro House Club (2017) and Jozi Acid (2017). He has also collaborated with Jerome Sydenham, Myd, Naive New Beaters, Angélique Kidjo, Lazy Flow, Smadj, The Very Best, Radioclit, Weapons. He has been invited to perform at festivals such as Solidays in 2014 and 2018, Jazz sous les pommiers, Afropunk (2018), Montreux Jazz Festival (2023 and 2024) as well as in museums and art centres around the world like Fondation Cartier in Paris (2015), Kadist Foundation in Paris (2021), Musée d'Ethnographie de Genève (2023) and Artspace in Sydney (2024).

Globalisto. A Philosophy in Flux, the exhibition he curated in 2022 at the Musée d'art moderne (Saint-Étienne) in France, focused on his research on a borderless world from a Pan-African perspective. In 2025, he co-curated Afrosonica. Soundscapes at the Musée d'Ethnographie de Genève with Madeleine Leclair.

His artworks have been exhibited at the Centre Pompidou in Paris in 2019 in the exhibition devoted to Ernest Mancoba, at the Grand Palais in Paris in collaboration with Sammy Baloji and at COUNTER IMAGES at the Rautenstrauch-Joest-Museum in Cologne in 2021, at the Dakar Biennale in 2022, at the Château d'Oiron and the Jeanne d’Arc Chapel in Thouars in France (2023). His first solo exhibition, Dance of the Ancestors, took place at The Over in Barcelona in 2023.

Bopape has written essays in the publications accompanying the exhibitions he has curated and articles in the press since 2009. HIs article “Kings, Queens, and the African Renaissance: Narratives of Sovereignty and (De)colonization” was commissioned for the catalogue of the exhibition Kings and Queens of Africa. Forms and Figures of Power at the Louvre Abu Dhabi, UAE in 2025. His text “Globalisto: Resonances of Transformation, Echoes of Sound, and the Praxis of Empathetic Listening in published by Sounds Now in the issue titled "Engaging" in 2024.
