= Hugh (bishop of Avranches) =

Hugh was bishop of Avranches from 1028–c. 1060. He was responsible for completing the most important parts of the cathedral, and took steps to reconstitute its holdings, securing donations from Robert I and William II.

Among the surviving charters he witnessed, some concern Mont-Saint-Michel, which was located in his Diocese. He witnessed confirmations of rights and donations to the abbey and obtained a life-lease grant of property from Abbott Suppo. He also had a strong connection to the abbey of Fécamp, where he was responsible for the benediction of John of Ravenna as abbott in 1028. He performed the rite in place of Robert, the archbishop of Rouen, probably because of the conflict between the latter and the duke. Later, he witnessed three life-lease agreements involving the abbey, including one that entitled him to the tithes of the town of Ryes and a manse of ten acres in the grounds of Fécamp.

He was among the attendees to the Rheims Council in 1049, an event where churchmen had to decide between attending the council (and pleasing the Pope Leo IX) or the feudal levy (and pleasing the King Henry I). His episcopate is traditionally dated until 1060, but his last datable appearance is from 25 December 1054.
