= Coutances Cathedral =

Gothic Catholic cathedral in Normandy, France

Coutances Cathedral Cathédrale Notre-Dame de Coutances
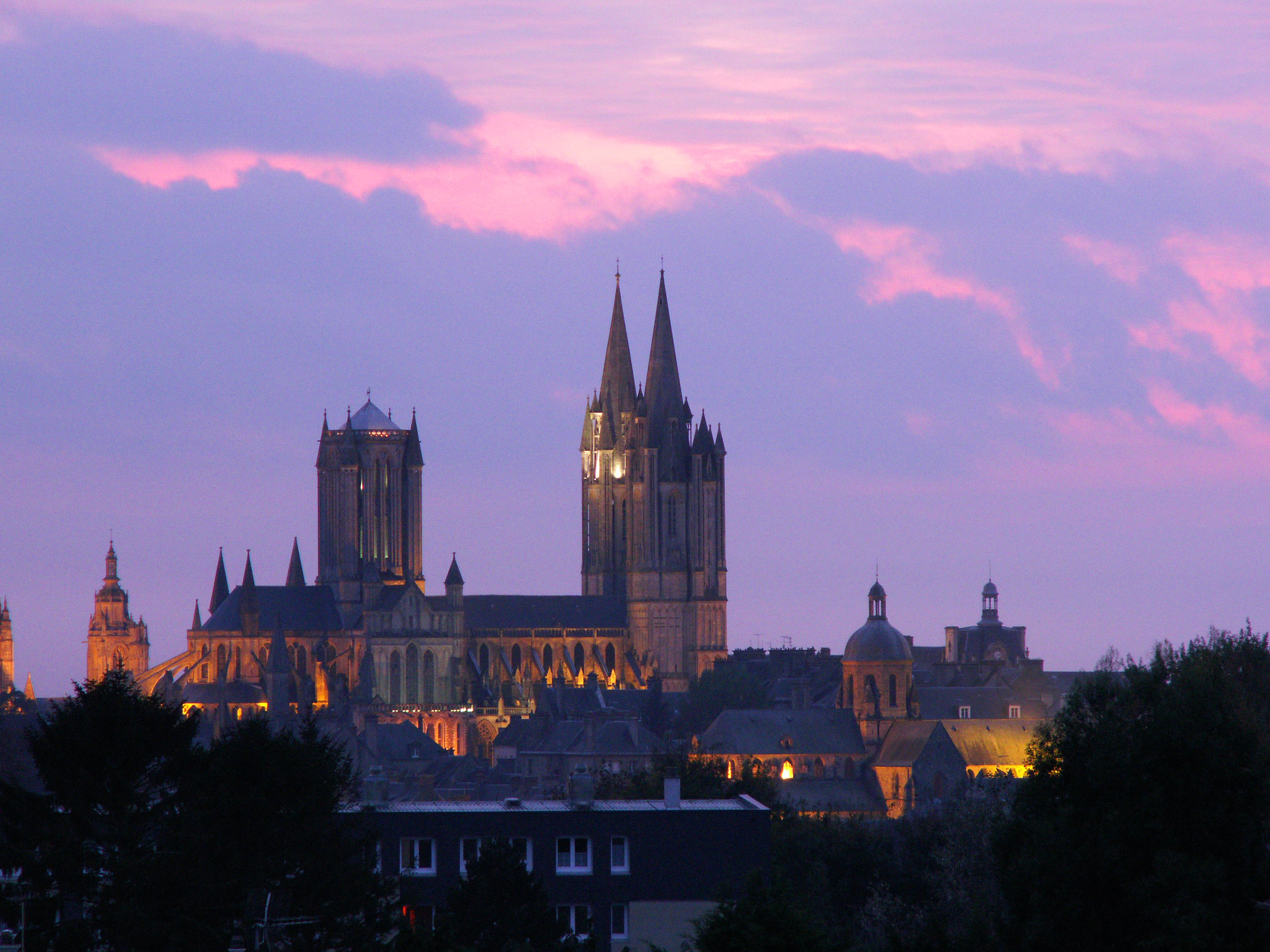
- Overview of Coutances Cathedral from the north

Religion
- Affiliation: Catholic
- Province: Diocese of Coutances
- Region: Normandy
- Rite: Roman Rite
- Ecclesiastical or organisational status: Cathedral
- Status: Active

Location
- Location: Coutances, France
- Interactive map of Coutances Cathedral; Cathédrale Notre-Dame de Coutances
- Coordinates: 49°02′52″N 1°26′45″W

Architecture
- Type: church
- Style: French Gothic
- Groundbreaking: 1210
- Completed: 1274

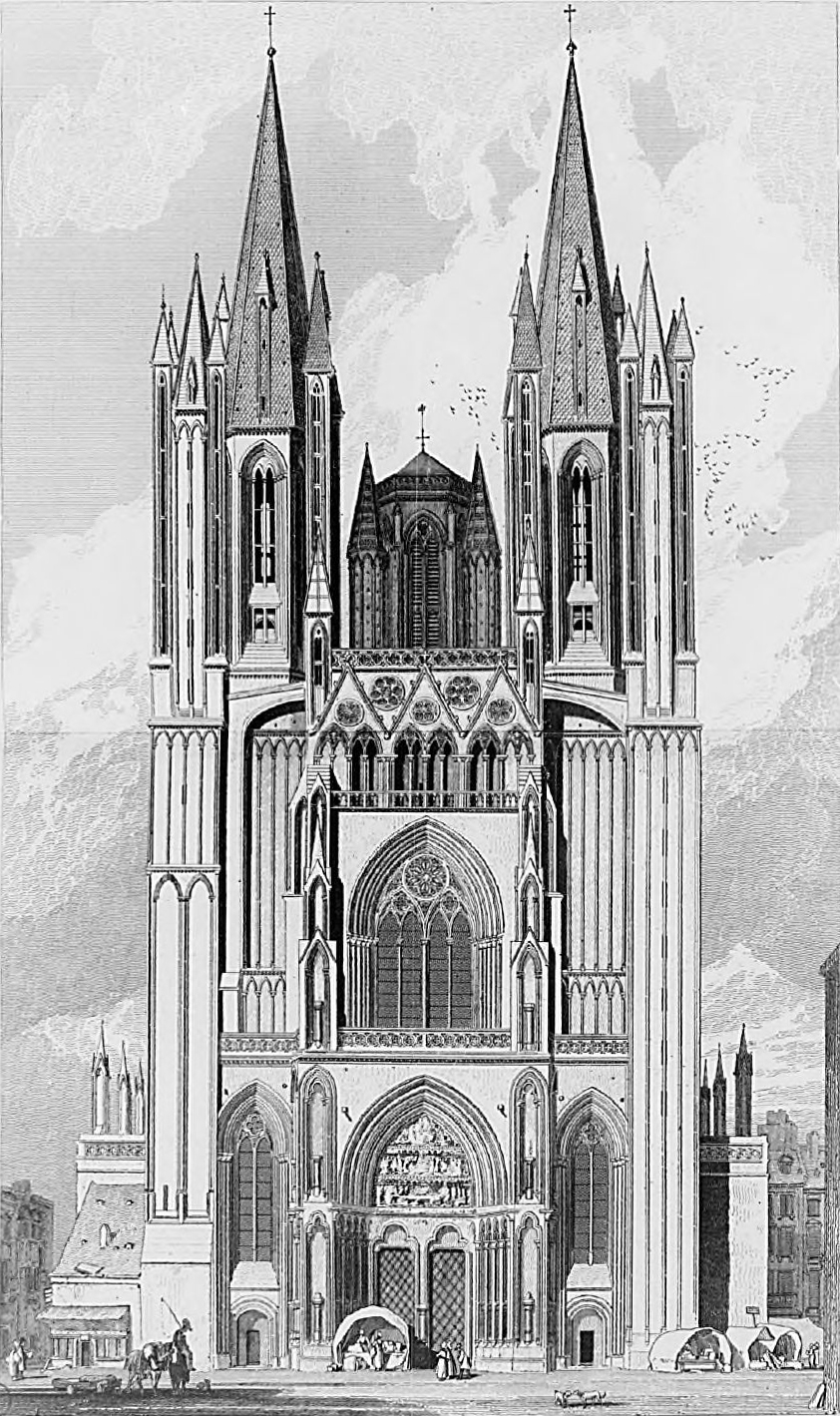
The west front

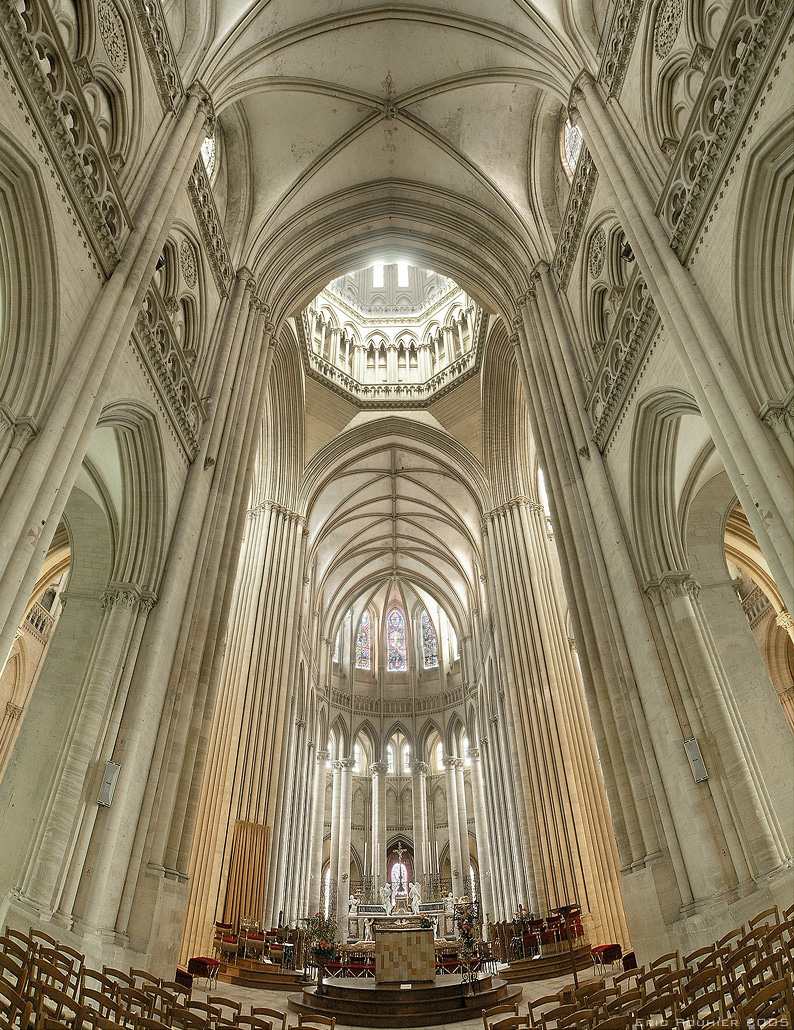
The interior of Coutances Cathedral

Coutances Cathedral (French: Cathédrale Notre-Dame de Coutances) is a Gothic Catholic cathedral constructed from 1210 to 1274 in the town of Coutances, Normandy, France. It incorporated the remains of an earlier Norman cathedral.

It is the seat of the Bishop of Coutances and Avranches and was previously that of the Bishop of Coutances.

Standing 80 metres (295 ft) tall, it dominates the town and can be seen from as far away as the island of Jersey. It is a classic example of the Gothic style of Normandy in its use of long, straight, vertical lines.

== History ==
The construction of the first church or cathedral in Coutances in the 5th century is credited to Saint Ereptiolus, traditionally also the first bishop. This cathedral was destroyed during the invasion of the Normans in the 9th century.

The site lay waste for about 150 years but, in the mid-11th century, Robert, bishop of Coutances, undertook the rebuilding of the cathedral in the Romanesque or Norman style, starting with the nave. Robert died shortly afterward, but the work was carried forward by Geoffrey de Montbray, his successor as bishop, appointed in 1048. Geoffrey was on good terms with William, Duke of Normandy (later known as the Conqueror), who attended the consecration of the new cathedral in 1056. The bishop subsequently accompanied William on the conquest of England. The cathedral benefited greatly from the enormous profits of this conquest.

The Romanesque cathedral suffered later from a serious fire. In 1210 Bishop Hugues de Morville started to build the present Gothic cathedral, retaining the dimensions and much of the fabric of the Romanesque building. Substantial remains of it underlie many of the walls and towers of the present cathedral.

The new cathedral was completed in 1274 and has remained basically unaltered since. The twin towers rise to almost 80m, and its octagonal lantern tower stands over 57m high.

Some damage was done in the Wars of Religion in 1562 but this was repaired soon after. The roodscreen was removed in the 17th century. In 1794 during the French Revolution much superficial damage was done: statues were removed from their niches whilst others were slashed with swords. The cathedral was used successively as a theatre, a grain store and a Temple of Reason, but despite the losses and damage, survived with its structure intact.

During World War II, although much damage was done to the town of Coutances, the cathedral again escaped almost unscathed.

== Building description ==
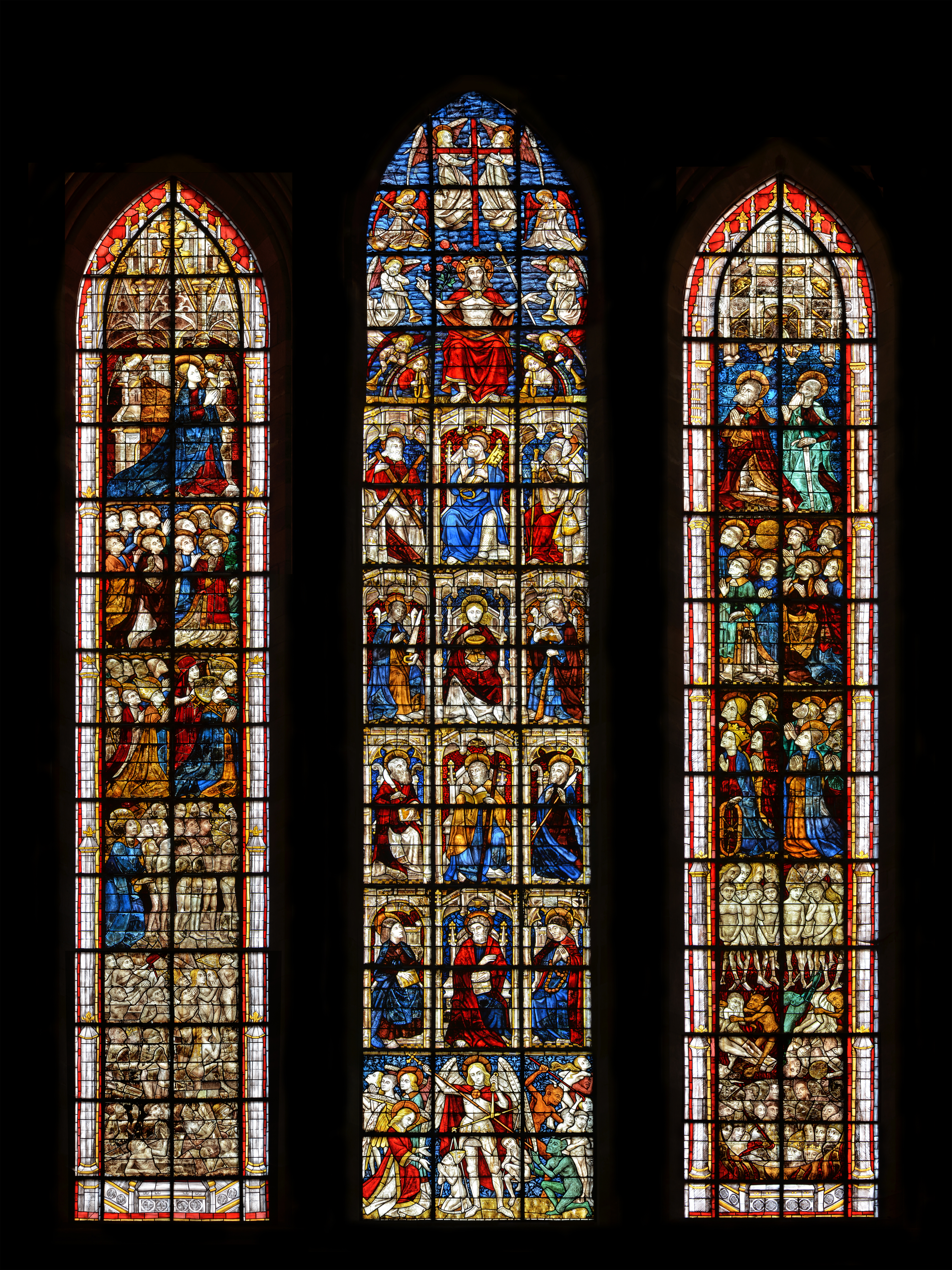
Stained glass windows depicting the Last Judgment.

Over the entrance is a modern window showing the figures of the cathedral founders of 1048 and 1218 (bishops Geoffroy de Montbray and Hugues de Morville); in the centre is the figure of Saint Ereptiole, believed to have built the first church in Coutances.

In the south aisle is a pillar with a carved capital depicting medieval ladies.

The lantern tower is designed to provide an intense source of light in the centre of the cathedral. Eyes are drawn to the circle at the centre which is meant to represent Heaven, while the earth is the square, and the octagon represents the Resurrection.

Behind the principal altar stand six pairs of pillars supporting the roof, which are said to stand for the Twelve Apostles. The windows date from the 15th century.

The south ambulatory contains the Chapel of Saint Joseph, with a wall painting of 1381 that depicts the Holy Trinity of God the Father, Christ on the Cross, and the Holy Spirit as a dove.

The Chapel of Saint Laud, also in the south ambulatory, is one of the oldest parts of the cathedral, dating from the 13th century. The stained glass window shows details from the life of Saint Lo, including the saint celebrating mass with the dove of the Holy Spirit appearing above the altar. (His helper holds the hem of his robe to prevent him stepping back on to it and tripping.)

The north ambulatory contains the Chapel of Saint Marcouf, with a window showing scenes from the saint's life. The north ambulatory also holds the holy oils (chrism) used during the sacraments of baptism and extreme unction, confirmation, and at the ordination of priests.

The north transept displays a 13th-century stained-glass window showing scenes from the lives of the saints Thomas Becket, George and Blaise.

The floor of the north aisle is laid with medieval tiles decorated with the fleur-de-lys, or lily, the emblem of the French royal family (and a symbol associated with the Virgin Mary). Other tiles show the arms of Castile, next to the fleur-de-lys of France. The baptismal font is located in the north aisle.

The cathedral has had an organ since before 1468. The current organ was built in 1728 and has four keyboards or manuals, 51 stops and a pedal board. The west window is partially hidden by the organ.

Above the south porch are the symbols of the four Evangelists (Saints Matthew, Mark, Luke and John).

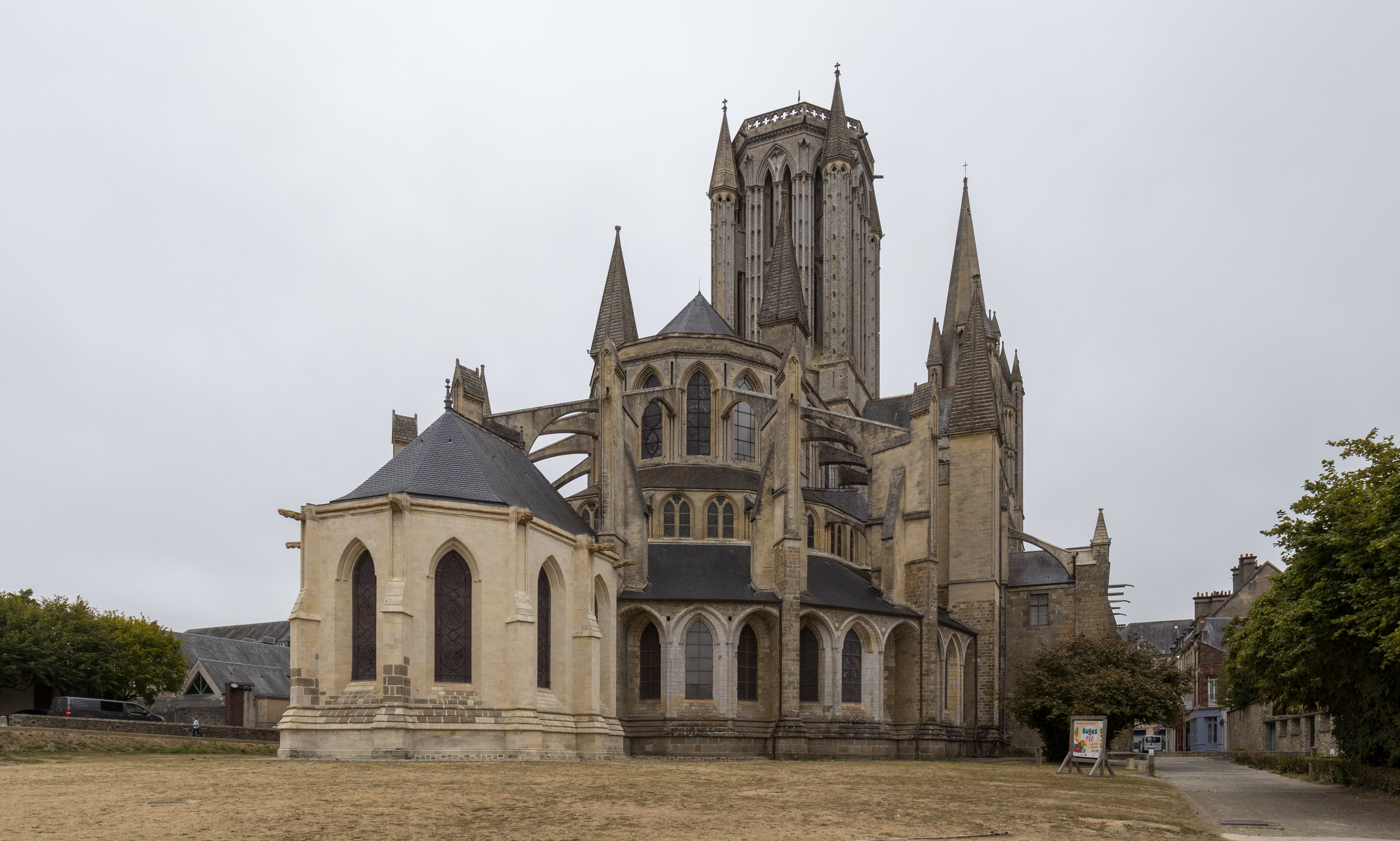
Coutances Cathedral (1210-1274)

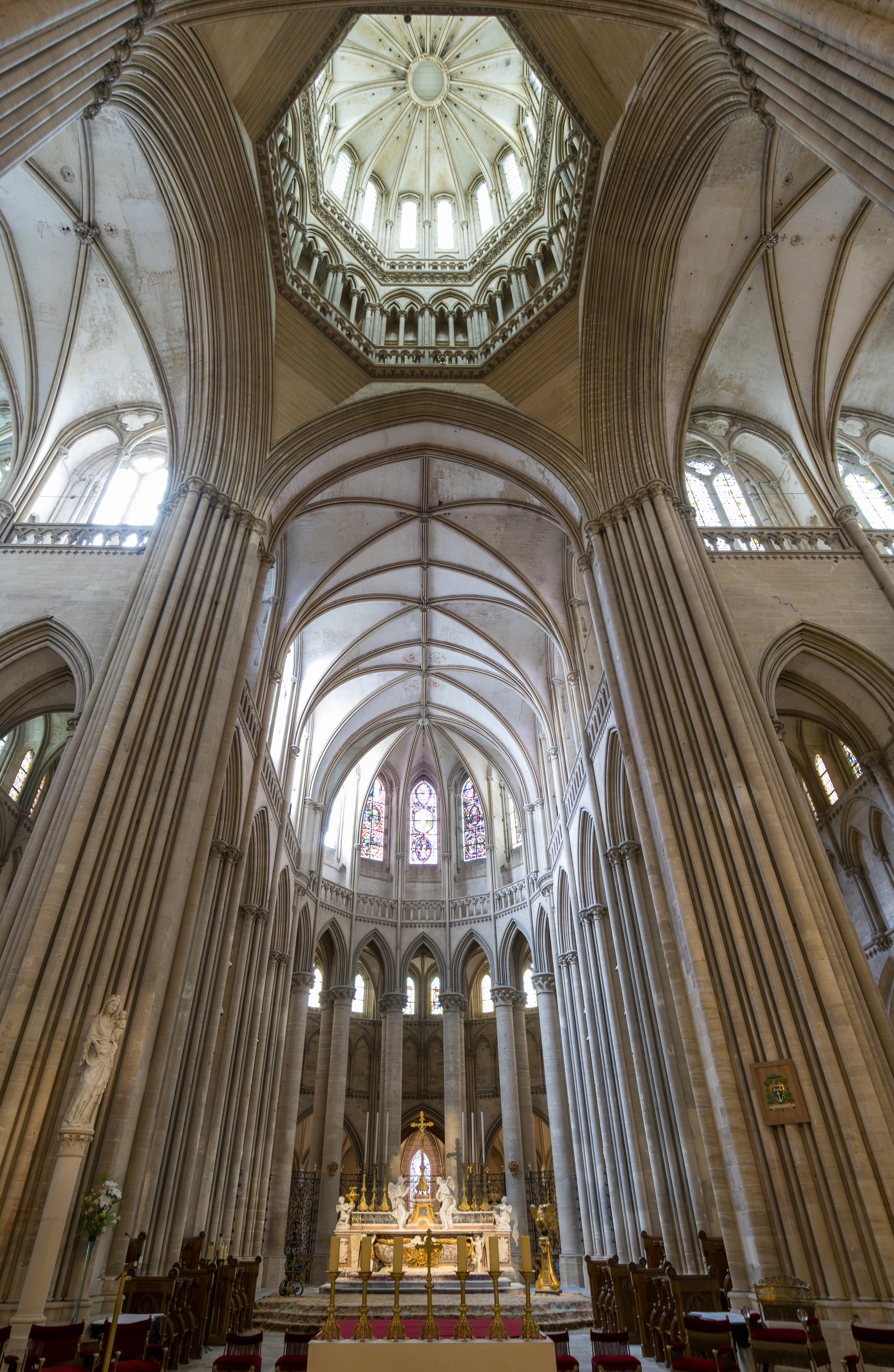
Vaults and lantern tower of Coutances Cathedral in Normandy (1210-1274)

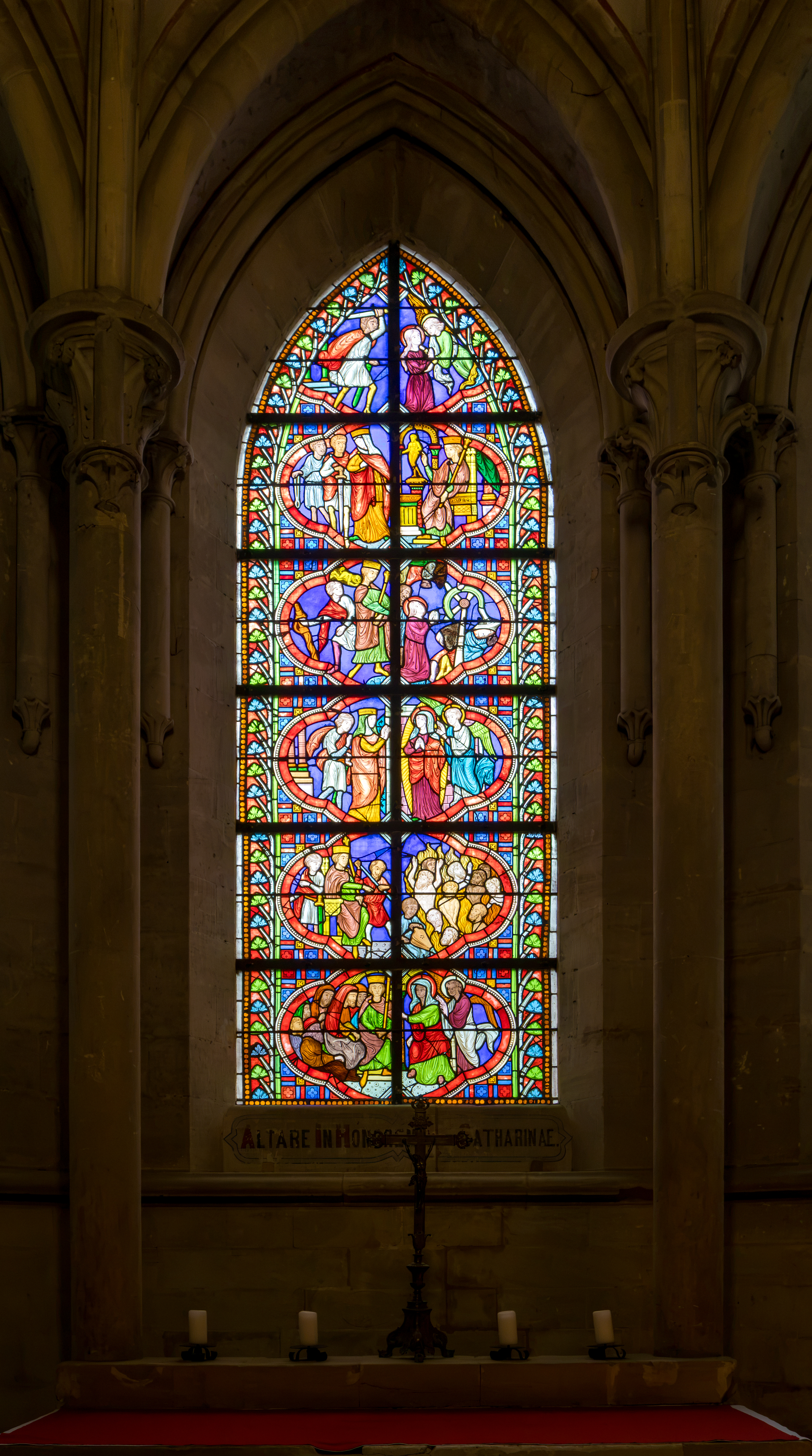
Sainte Catherine Stained Glass

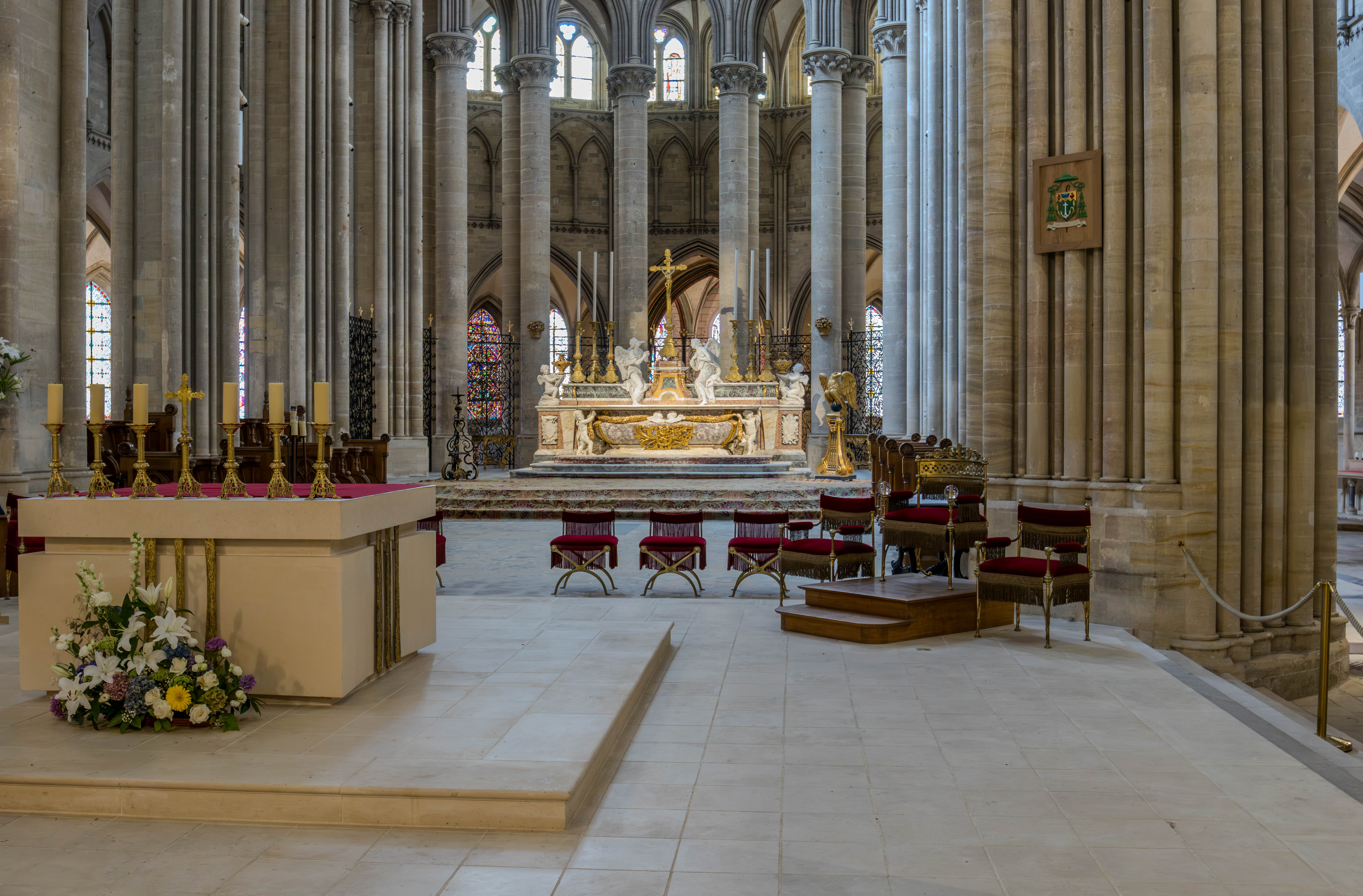
The Choir

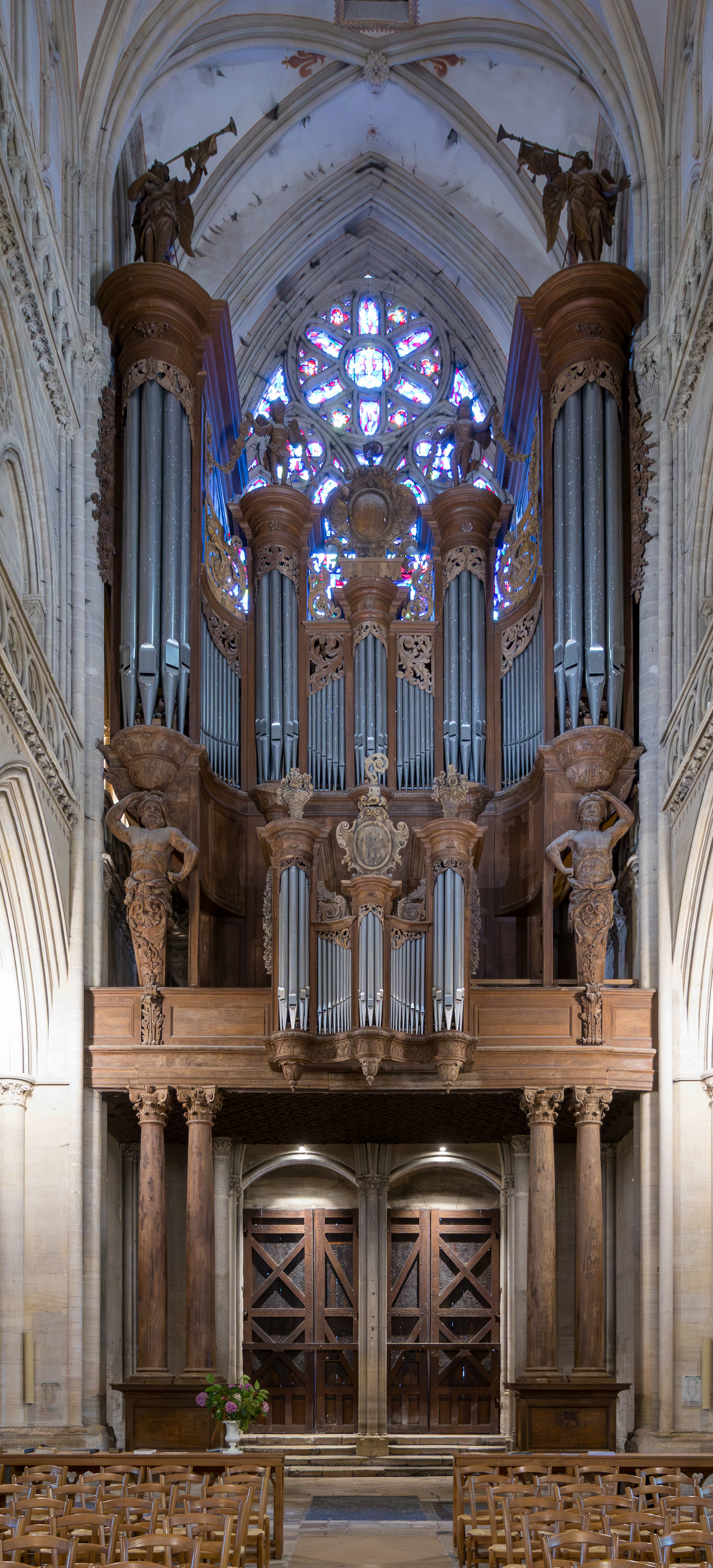
The organ

The apse chapel

== Sources ==
- Coutances Cathedral at Structurae
- (in French) Association des Amis de la Cathédrale de Coutances
- (in French) Cathédrales de France: Coutances
- (in French) Architecture Religieuse en Occident: Notre-Dame de Coutances
- (in French) Diocese of Coutances and Avranches official website
- Guillier, Gérard. Coutances, l'Elan médiéval
- Musset, Lucien. Geoffroy de Montbray, évêque de Coutances
- Coutances, ville d'art - Art de Basse-Normandie, 1987
- Coutances et le Coutançais. Collectif: Manche Tourisme, 1992
- L'architecture normande au Moyen-Age. Presses Universitaires de Caen, 1997

== See also ==
- List of Gothic Cathedrals in Europe
- High medieval domes
