= Cours =

Cours is a French word that can refer to:

== Places ==
Cours is the name or part of the name of several communes in France:

- Cours, Rhône, in the Rhône departement
- Cours, Lot, in the Lot department
- Cours, Lot-et-Garonne, in the Lot-et-Garonne department
- Cours, Deux-Sèvres, in the Deux-Sèvres department
- Cosne-Cours-sur-Loire, in the Nièvre department
- Cours-de-Monségur, in the Gironde department
- Cours-de-Pile, in the Dordogne department
- Cours-la-Ville, in the Rhône department
- Cours-les-Bains, in the Gironde department
- Cours-les-Barres, in the Cher department
- Le Cours, in the Morbihan department
- Magny-Cours, in the Nièvre department
- Mas-des-Cours, in the Aude department

== Other ==
- Cours (Byzantine general), Byzantine general of the late 6th century
- Cours (TV production), a unit of production in Japanese TV programs equivalent to approximately 11 to 13 episodes

== See also ==
- Cour, a surname
