= Auguste François Lecanu =

French historian (1803–1884)

Auguste François Lecanu (December 13, 1803 – February 9, 1884), was a French Catholic figure, professor, writer, and historian.

== Life ==
Auguste François Lecanu was born in Bréville-sur-Mer, December 13, 1803. Drawn to theology, Auguste Lecanu was ordained a priest on July 9, 1826, and became a vicar in Carantilly, later serving as the parish priest of Bolleville from 1831 to 1840. From 1840 to 1845, he was a professor at the Royal College of Caen and then settled in Paris until 1863. During that time, he was part of the clergy at Saint-Germain-l'Auxerrois. Upon returning to his homeland, Auguste Lecanu became the chaplain of the Ursulines of Mortain from 1863 to 1872, and later, a titular canon of the chapter of Coutances.

Auguste Lecanu showed an early interest in the ecclesiastical history of La Manche. This interest was already evident in 1839 with the publication of his History of the Bishops of Coutances, and later in 1877 and 1878 with his History of the Diocese of Coutances and Avranches, a work that encapsulated a lifetime of research. These pursuits led him to become a member of the Society of Antiquaries of Normandy and several other scientific societies. Lecanu died in Coutances, February 9, 1884.

== Works ==
- Histoire des évêques de Coutances depuis la fondation de l'évêché jusqu'à nos jours, J.V. Voisin, Coutances, 1839.
- Histoire de Clichy-la-Garenne, Poussielgue, Paris, 1848.
- Dictionnaire des prophéties et des miracles, Nouvelle encyclopédie théologique 24, J.-P. Migne, 1852.
- L'Imitation des saints pour tous les jours de l'année, Furne, Paris, 1854.
- Les Sibylles et les livres sibyllins, étude historique et littéraire, thèse pour le doctorat en théologie, Bailly, Divry et Cie, Paris, 1857.
- Histoire de Satan, Parent-Desbarres, Paris, 1861.
- Histoire de N. S. Jésus-Christ, Parent Desbarres, Paris, 1863.
- Histoire du diocèse de Coutances et Avranches depuis les temps les plus reculés jusqu'à nos jours, suivie des actes des saints et d'un tableau historique des paroisses, 2 vol., Coutances, imprimerie de Salettes, 1877-1878.
- Histoire de la sainte Vierge d'après l'Evangile, les prophéties, les documents des premiers siècles chrétiens, les monuments de l'Egypte et de la Palestine, et les enseignements de l'Eglise, Paris, 1860.
