= Laud of Coutances =

Saint Laud of Coutances
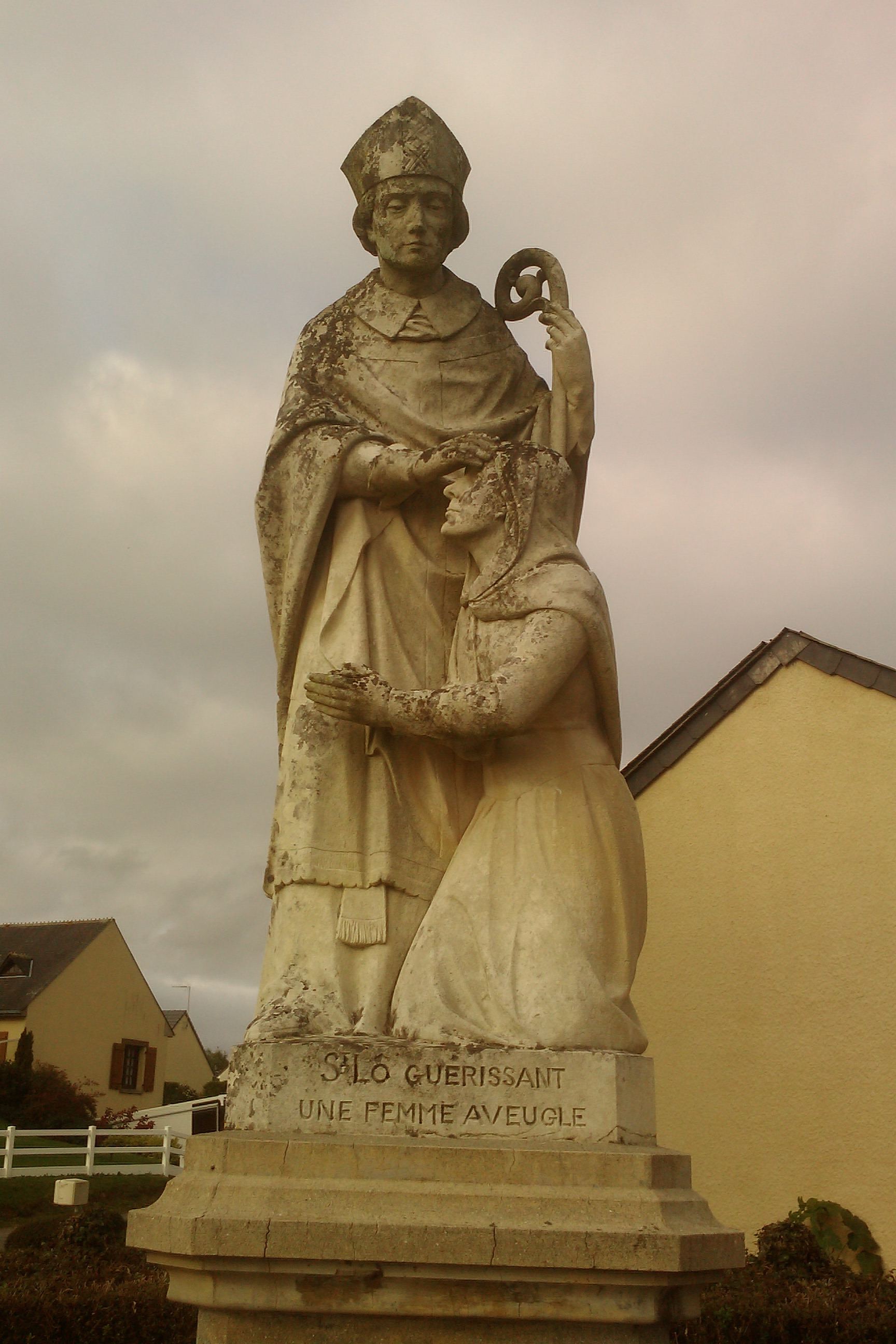

Bishop
- Born: 6th century Courcy, Manche, France
- Venerated in: Roman Catholic church Eastern Orthodox church
- Canonized: Pre-Congregation
- Feast: September 22

Saint Laud of Coutances (variants: Lauto, Laudo, Launus, popularly: Saint Lô) was the fifth bishop of Coutances and is venerated as a saint in the Roman Catholic and Eastern Orthodox Churches.

He was born in Courcy, near Coutances, in the 6th century AD and became bishop of Coutances around 525. The town of Briovere, associated with the saint, took his name and is now Saint-Lô in Normandy. He met with a conclave of bishops at Angers in 529 or 530.

As a healing saint, he is invoked for maladies of the eyes and especially blindness. The reputed healing spring at Courcy dedicated to him is a site of pilgrimage.

He is commemorated September 21 in the French Martyrology, and September 22 in the Roman Martyrology.

St. Laud's Church in Sherington and St Laudus (Laud) in the civil parish of Mabe, Cornwall, are the only churches in England known to be dedicated to Saint Laud.
