= Diocese of Coutances =

Catholic diocese in France

Coordinates: 49.05°N 1.45°W

Diocese of Coutances (–Avranches) Dioecesis Constantiensis (–Abrincensis) Diocèse de Coutances (–Avranches)

Catholic
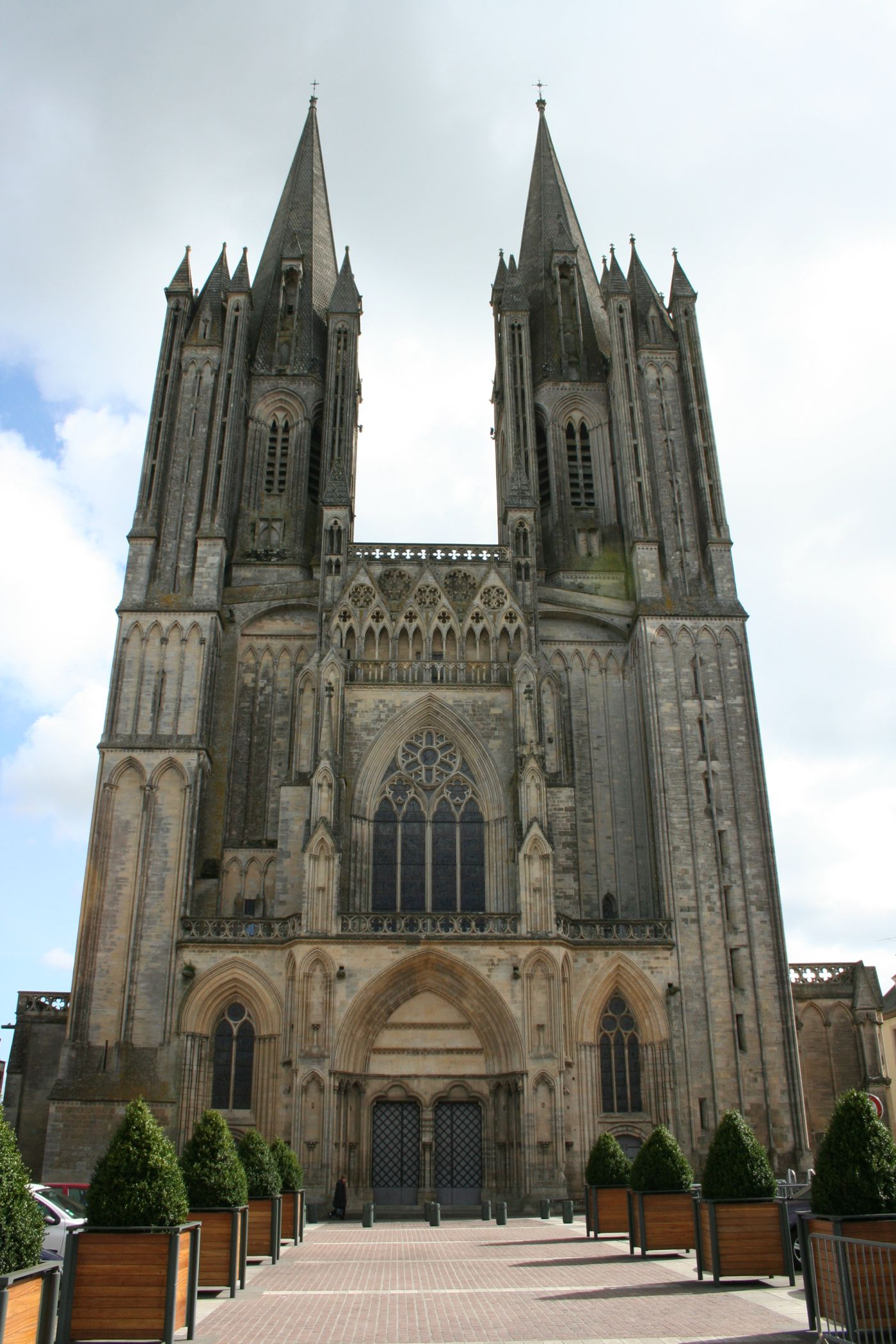
- Coutances Cathedral

Location
- Country: France
- Ecclesiastical province: Rouen
- Metropolitan: Archdiocese of Rouen

Statistics
- Area: 5,991 km^{2} (2,313 sq mi)
- Population: Total; Catholics: (as of 2021); 491,532; 408,740 (83.2%)
- Parishes: 58

Information
- Denomination: Catholic
- Sui iuris church: Latin Church
- Rite: Roman Rite
- Established: 5th Century (As Diocese of Coutances); 12 July 1854 (As Diocese of Coutances-Avranches)
- Cathedral: Coutances Cathedral
- Patron saint: Blessed Virgin Mary; St. Laud of Coutances
- Secular priests: 112 (Diocesan); 4 (Religious Orders); 50 Permanent Deacons

Current leadership
- Pope: Leo XIV
- Bishop: Grégoire Cador
- Metropolitan Archbishop: Dominique Lebrun

Map

Website
- coutances.catholique.fr

The Diocese of Coutances (–Avranches) (Latin: Dioecesis Constantiensis (–Abrincensis); French: Diocèse de Coutances (–Avranches)) is a Latin diocese of the Catholic Church in France. Its mother church is the Cathedral of Coutance in the commune of Coutances in France. The diocese is suffragan of the Archbishop of Rouen and comprises the entire department of Manche. It was enlarged in 1802 by the addition of the former Diocese of Avranches and of two archdeaconries from the Diocese of Bayeux. Since 1854 its bishops have held the title of Bishop of Coutances (–Avranches).

In 2021, in the Diocese of Coutances there was one priest for every 3,523 Catholics.

== History of the Diocese of Coutances ==
The diocese of Coutances was founded in Frankish times but the bishop had to flee to Rouen in the ninth century due to Viking raids and was not able to return until at least 1025 despite the Christianisation of the Duchy of Normandy.

The Bishop of Coutances exercised ecclesiastical jurisdiction over the Channel Islands, mostly in Alderney where the Bishop also held partial authority over the Leader of Alderney, until the Reformation, despite the secular division of Normandy in 1204. The final rupture occurred definitively in 1569 when Queen Elizabeth I demanded that the Bishops hand the island over to the Bishop of Winchester.

In 1757 the city of Coutances had a population of about 12,000 Catholics. The cathedral was dedicated to the Virgin Mary. Its Chapter was composed of eight dignities (the Cantor, four Archdeacons, the Scholasticus, the Treasurer, and the Penitentiary) and twenty-five Canons. There were also six Choral Vicars, forty-two chaplains, fourteen choristers and six boy singers, and a body of musicians. The Cantor has existed from the 11th century. The four archdeacons were: Coutances, Baptois, Val-de-Vire and Cotentin. In the city were two parishes (Saint-Pierre and Saint-Nicolas), two houses of male religious, and two monasteries of monks. The entire diocese had some 500 parishes.

The diocese contained seven houses of Benedictine monks: Saint-Sever, Lessay, Saint-Sauveur le Vicomte, Montebourg, Hambie, Notre-Dame de Protection (Valognes, 1626, women), and Notre-Dame des Anges (Coutances, 1633, women). There was a house of Premonstratensians at Blanchelande; and two houses of Augustinians, at Saint-Lô and Notre-Dame de Voeu at Cherbourg. All were abolished by will of the Constituent Assembly in 1790, and their properties confiscated and sold. Monastic vows were dissolved and forbidden. On 12 April 1791 the priests of the seminary were expelled for refusing to take the Oath to the Constitution. On 15 January 1793 the turn came of the houses of women to be closed and confiscated, and their inhabitants forcibly ejected.

== History of the Diocese of Avranches ==
The Cathedral of Avranches, situated in a town of some 2500 inhabitants in 1764, was dedicated to Saint Andrew on 17 September 1211. The Chapter of the cathedral had six dignities (the Dean, the Cantor, the Treasurer, the Scholasticus and the two Archdeacons) and eighteen Canons. The archdeacons were named Archidiaconus Abricensis and Archidiaconus Vallis Moretonii. The town contained three parishes, one community of male religious and one monastery of monks. The entire diocese contained 170 parishes.

The Diocese of Avranches was abolished during the French Revolution by the Legislative Assembly, under the Civil Constitution of the Clergy (1790). Its territory was subsumed into the new diocese, called 'Manche', with its seat at Coutances, which was part of the Metropolitanate called the 'Côtes de la Manche' (which included eight new 'départements'), with its seat at Rouen (Seine-Inférieure). When the Concordat of 1801 was struck between Pope Pius VII and First Consul Bonaparte, the Diocese of Avranches was not revived.

== List of bishops ==
=== Bishops of Coutances ===
==== to 1050 ====
- Ereptiolus, c. 430–473
- Exuperus (or Exuperatus), c. 473–500
- Leontianus, c.500–512
- Possessor, c. 512–523
- Lauto (Saint-Lô), c. 525–565
- Romacharius (Rumpharius), c. 566–600 ?
- Saint Ursinus
- Ulfobertus, c. 600–610
- Lupicinus, c. 610–640
- Nepus
- Chairibonus, attested 650
- Waldomar (or Baldomer), c. 650–660
- Hulderic, c. 660–674
- Frodemundus, 677–690
- Wilbert (or Aldebert)
- Agathius
- Livin
- Wilfrid
- Joshua
- Leon
- Angulon
- Hubert
- Willard, c. 820– c. 840
- Herluin, c. 840–862
- Sigenand (or Seginand), c. 862–880
- Lista (or Listus), c. 880–888/90
- Raguenard, c. 898–???
- Herlebaud (or Erleboldus)
- Agebert

Bishops in exile at Rouen

- Theodoric (Thierry), c. 911
- Herbert I
- Algerund (Algeronde)
- Gilbert (Gillebert)
- Hugues I (Hugh), c. 989–1025

Bishops in Saint–Lô

- Herbert II, c. 1025–1026, left Rouen and installed himself at Saint–Lô
- Robert I, c. 1026–1048, also bishop of Lisieux

==== from 1050 to 1400 ====
- Geoffrey de Montbray, 1049–1093
- Raoul, 1093–1110
- Roger, c. 1114–1123
- Richard de Brix (alias de Bruce), 1124–1131
- Algare (Algarus, Algardus or Algarius), 1132–1151, previously prior of Bodmin
- Richard de Bohon, 1151–1179
- Guillaume de Tournebu, 1184–1202
- Vivien de L'Étang (de L'Estang), 1202–1208
- Hugues de Morville, 1208–1238, principal restorer of the cathedral
- Gilles de Caen (or Gilon), 1246–1248
- Jean d'Essay, 1251–1274
- Eustache, O.Min., 1282–1291
- Robert de Harcourt, 1291–1315
- Guillaume de Thieuville, 1315–1345
- Louis Herpin d'Erquery, 1346–1370
- Sylvestre de La Cervelle, 1371–1386
- Nicolas de Tholon (Toulon), 1386–1387 (Avignon Obedience)
- Guillaume de Crèvecoeur, 1387–1408

==== from 1400 to 1600 ====
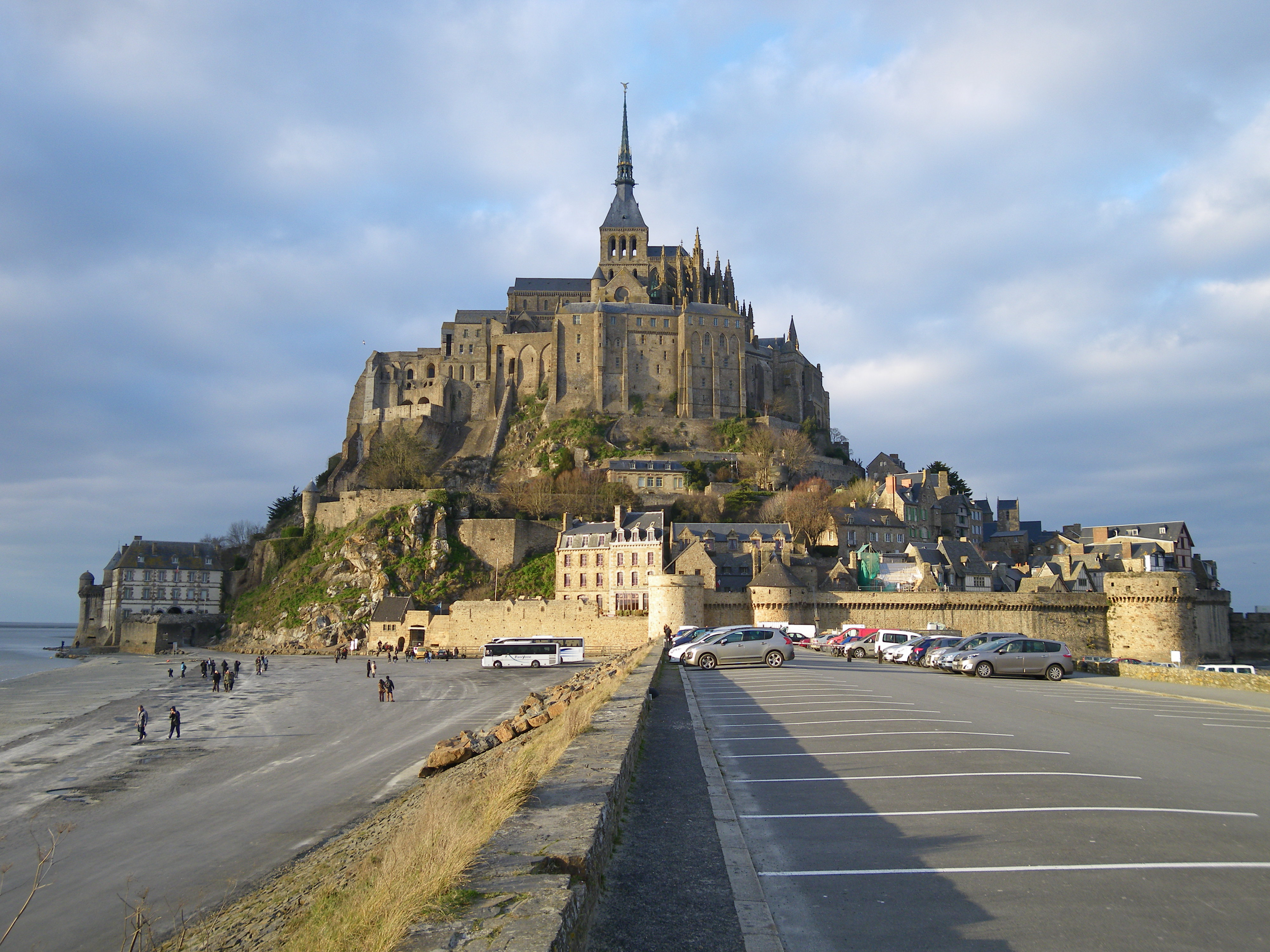
Bishop Aubert of Avranches (ca. 709) began construction of what became Mont Saint-Michel

- Aegidius (Gilles des Champs), 1408–1413 (Appointed by Alexander V)
- Jean de Marle, 1414–1418
- Pandolfo Malatesta, 1418–1424, present at the Council of Constance
- Philibert de Montjeu, 1424–1439, present at the Council of Basel
- Gilles de Duremort, O.Cist. 1439–1444, judge in the trial of Joan of Arc
- Giovanni Castiglione, 1444–1453
- Richard Olivier de Longueil, 1453–1470, made a cardinal in 1456.
- Benoît de Montferrand, 1470–1476
- Cardinal Giuliano della Rovere, 1476–1477, non-resident, became Pope in 1503.
- Galeazzo della Rovere, 1477–1478, non-resident, became bishop of Agen
- Geoffroy Herbert, 1478–1510
- Adrien Gouffier de Boissy, 1510–1519, cardinal
  - Bernard Dovizi da Bibbiena, 1519–1520, Administrator
- René de Bresche de La Trémoïlle, 1519–1529, abbot of Flavigny
- Philippe de Cossé–Brissac, 1530–1548, non-resident
- Payen Le Sueur d'Esquetot, 1549–1551
- Étienne Martel de Bacqueville, 1552–1560
- Arthur de Cossé–Brissac, 1560–1587
  - Lancelot Goyon de Matignon, 1587–1588, died just ten days after his nomination.

==== from 1600 to 1854 ====
- Nicolas de Briroy, 1589–1620, consecrated in 1597
  - Guillaume Le Blanc, 1621, died before his consecration
  - Jacques de Carbonnel, 1621, never consecrated
- Nicolas Bourgoin, 1622–1625
- Léonor I Goyon de Matignon, 1627–1646, became bishop of Lisieux
- Claude Auvry, 1646–1658
- Eustache Le Clerc de Lesseville, 1658–1665
- Charles–François de Loménie de Brienne, 1666–1720
- Léonor II Goyon de Matignon, 1721–1757
- Jacques Le Febvre du Quesnoy, 1757–1764
- Ange–François de Talaru de Chalmazel, 1764–1798
  - François Bécherel, 1791–1801 (Constitutional Bishop of Manche)
- Claude-Louis Rousseau 14 Apr 1802 – 3 Aug 1807
- Pierre Dupont de Poursat 3 Aug 1807 – 17 Sep 1835.
- Louis-Jean-Julien Robiou de la Tréhonnais 1 Feb 1836 – 7 Dec 1852

=== Bishops of Avranches ===
- Nepos, (attested 511)
- Severus c. 520
- Perpetuus 533–541
- Egidius 549–550
- Paternus, (died 565)
- Senator (Saint Sénier), 563
- Saint Leudeuald, Leodovaldus c. 580
- Hildoaldus c. 614– after 627
- Saint Rahentrannus, Ragertran, Ragertrannus (after 681 or 683)
- Aubertus, c. 708
- Jean I c. 840
- Ansegardus c. 847–c. 853
- Remedius 855
- Walbert c. 859–c. 862
- Norgod (Norgaud) c. 990–c. 1017 or 1018
- Maugis (Maingise) 1022–c. 1026
- Hugo 1028–c. 1060
- Jean d'Ivry (or de Bayeux) 1060–1067, in 1068 Archbishop of Rouen, son of Rodulf of Ivry
- Michael I 1068–1094
- Turgis (Turgise) 1094–1134
- Richard de Beaufou 1134–1142
- Richard de Subligny 1142–1153
- Herbert II 1154–1161
- Achard of St. Victor 1162–1171
- Richard III 1171–1182
- Guillaume I Bureau 1182–c. 1195
- Guillaume II de Chemillé 1196–1198
- Guillaume III Tollerment 1199–1210
- Guillaume IV Bureau 1210–1236
- Guillaume V de Saint-Mère-Eglise 1236–1253
- Richard IV L`Ainé 1253–1257
- Guillaume VI 1257–1258
- Richard V L`Anglois 1259–1269
- Raoul de Thiéville 1269–1292
- Geoffroi Boucher 1293–1306
- Nicolas de Luzarches 1307–1311
- Michel II de Pontorson 1311–1312
- Jean III de La Mouche 1312–1327
- Jean IV de Vienne 1328–1331
- Jean V Hautfune 1331–1358
- Foulque Bardoul 1358–1359
- Robert I de La Porte 1359–1379
- Laurent de Faye 1379–1391 (Avignon Obedience)
- Jean VI de Saint-Avit 1391–1442 (Avignon Obedience)
- Martin Pinard 1442–1458
- Jean VII Bouchard 1458–1484
- Louis de Bourbon-Vendôme 1484–1510
- Louis Herbert 1511–1526
- Agostino Trivulzio 1526 (administrator)
- Jean VIII de Langeac 1526–1532
- Robert Ceneau (Robert Cénalis) 1532–1560 (also Bishop of Vence and Bishop of Riez)
- Antoine Le Cirier 1561–1575
- Augustin Le Cirier 1575–1580
- Georges de Péricard 1583–1587
- François de Péricard 1588–1639
- Charles Vialart de Saint-Paul 1640–1644
- Roger D'Aumont 1645–1651
- Gabriel Boislève 1652–1657
- Gabriel-Philippe de Froulay de Tessé 1668–1689
  - Fabio Brulart de Sillery 1689
- Pierre Daniel Huet 1689–1699
- Roland-François de Kerhoen de Coettenfau 1709–1719
- César Le Blanc, O.C.S.A. 1719–1746
- Pierre-Jean-Baptiste Durand de Missy 1746–1764
- Raimond de Durfort 1764–1766
- Joseph-François de Malide 1766–1774
- Pierre-Augustin Godard de Belbeuf 1774–1790

=== Bishops of Coutances and Avranches ===
- Jacques-Louis Daniel, 1854–1862
- Jean-Pierre Bravard, 1862–1875
- Abel-Anastase Germain, 1876–1897
- Joseph Guérard, 1899–1924
- Théophile-Marie Louvard, 1924–1950
- Jean Guyot, 1950–1966.
- Joseph Wicquart, 1966–1988
- Jacques Fihey, 1989–2006
- Stanislas Lalanne, 2007–2013
- Laurent Le Boulc'h (2013 – 2023)
- Grégoire Cador (2023 – 20??)

== See also ==
- Catholic Church in France
- List of Catholic dioceses in France

== Bibliography ==
=== Reference works ===
- Gallia christiana: in provincias ecclesiasticas distributa (in Latin). Vol. Tomus undecimus (11). Paris: ex Typographia regia. 1759. pp. 865–949, Instrumenta, pp. 218–338.
- Gams, Pius Bonifatius (1873). Series episcoporum Ecclesiae catholicae: quotquot innotuerunt a beato Petro apostolo. Ratisbon: Typis et Sumptibus Georgii Josephi Manz. (Use with caution; obsolete)
- Eubel, Conradus, ed. (1913). Hierarchia catholica, Tomus 1 (second ed.). Münster: Libreria Regensbergiana. (in Latin)
- Eubel, Conradus, ed. (1914). Hierarchia catholica, Tomus 2 (second ed.). Münster: Libreria Regensbergiana. (in Latin)
- Gulik, Guilelmus (1923). Eubel, Conradus (ed.). Hierarchia catholica, Tomus 3 (second ed.). Münster: Libreria Regensbergiana.
- Gauchat, Patritius (Patrice) (1935). Hierarchia catholica IV (1592–1667). Münster: Libraria Regensbergiana.
- Ritzler, Remigius; Sefrin, Pirminus (1952). Hierarchia catholica medii et recentis aevi V (1667–1730). Patavii: Messagero di S. Antonio.
- Ritzler, Remigius; Sefrin, Pirminus (1958). Hierarchia catholica medii et recentis aevi VI (1730–1799). Patavii: Messagero di S. Antonio.
- Round, John Horace (1899). Calendar of documents preserved in France: illustrative of the history of Great Britain and Ireland. A.D. 918–1206. Vol. 1. Vol. 1. London: H.M. Stationery Office. pp. 249–351. ISBN 9781313514026.

=== Studies ===
- Daniel, Jacques Louis (1848). Notice historique sur le Collège de Coutances (in French). Caen: Typ. de A. Hardel.
- Desroches, Jean-Jacques (1838). Histoire du Mont Saint-Michel et de l'ancien Diocese d'Avranches (in French). Vol. 2 vols. Caen: Chez Mancel.
- Duchesne, Louis (1910). Fastes épiscopaux de l'ancienne Gaule: II. L'Aquitaine et les Lyonnaises. Paris: Fontemoing. pp. 130–134.
- Hayden, J. Michael (2013). "Chapter 3: The Catholicisms of the Bishops of Coutances". The Catholicisms of Coutances: Varieties of Religion in Early Modern France, 1350–1789. Montreal-Kingston: McGill-Queens Univ. Press. ISBN 978-0-7735-8847-9.
- Jean, Armand (1891). Les évêques et les archevêques de France depuis 1682 jusqu'à 1801 (in French). Paris: A. Picard.
- Le Moigne, Frédéric; Christian Sorrel (2016). Les évêques français de la Séparation au pontificat de Jean-Paul II (in French). Paris: Editions du Cerf. ISBN 978-2-204-12086-9.
- Lecanu, Auguste François (1877). Histoire du diocèse de Coutances et Avranches (in French). Vol. Tome I. Coutances: Salettes. Lecanu, Auguste François (1878). Tome II (in French).
- Pigeon, E. A. (1876). Histoire de la Cathédrale de Coutances (in French). Coutances: E. Salettes Fils.
- Morris, Marc (2012). The Norman Conquest: The Battle of Hastings and the Fall of Anglo-Saxon England'. ISBN 978-1-4481-3602-5.
- Power, Daniel (16 December 2004). The Norman Frontier in the Twelfth and Early Thirteenth Centuries. Cambridge University Press. pp. 43–53, 113–121, 132–135. ISBN 978-0-521-57172-2. (Avranches)
- Société bibliographique (France) (1907). L'épiscopat français depuis le Concordat jusqu'à la Séparation (1802-1905). Paris: Librairie des Saints-Pères.
- Toussaint, Joseph (1983). Coutances: du concordat à la séparation, 1801–1905 (in French). Coutances: OCEP. ISBN 978-2-7134-0058-2.
- Toustain de Billy, Rene (1874). Histoire ecclésiastique du Diocèse de Coutances (in French). Vol. Tome I. Rouen: Ch. Métérie. Billy, René Toustain de (1880). Tome II. Billy, René Toustain de (1886). Tome III.
