= Norgod =

Norgod was bishop of Avranches from 990 to 1017–c. 1022. Almost nothing is known about him, and his first appearance as bishop dates from the foundation of Fécamp, on 15 June 990. After that, he appears c. 1015 witnessing two charters with donations to Mont Saint-Michel, by Robert, Count of Mortain, and Gunnor, wife or Richard I. Finally, in 1017, he witnessed a charter by William of Volpiano concerning the privileges of the monks of Fruttuaria. He removed himself to Mont Saint-Michel soon after, where he finished his days as a monk. He died either on 14 October, either on 1026 or 1036.

The only other reference to Norgod is a story of a vision preserved in Latin and the vernacular. In the story, after a meeting with Mainard II, abbot of Mont-Sant-Michel, Norgod saw a fire consuming the abbey. Next day, he went to the abbey to bury the dead, but nothing had happened. Then both men deduced that Norgod had seen the Archangel Michael hovering over the abbey.
