= Geoffrey de Montbray =

Bishop of Coutances (d. 1093)

- Bishop of Coutances
- Appointed: 1049
- Term ended: 1093

Orders
- Consecration: 12 March 1049

Personal details
- Died: 1093 Coutances, Normany

Geoffrey de Montbray (died 1093), also known as Montbrai, Mowbray or Geoffrey of Coutances, was a Norman nobleman, secular prelate, warrior and administrator who was Bishop of Coutances from 1049 to 1093. He was an adviser of William the Conqueror. Robert de Mowbray was his heir and nephew.

== Career ==
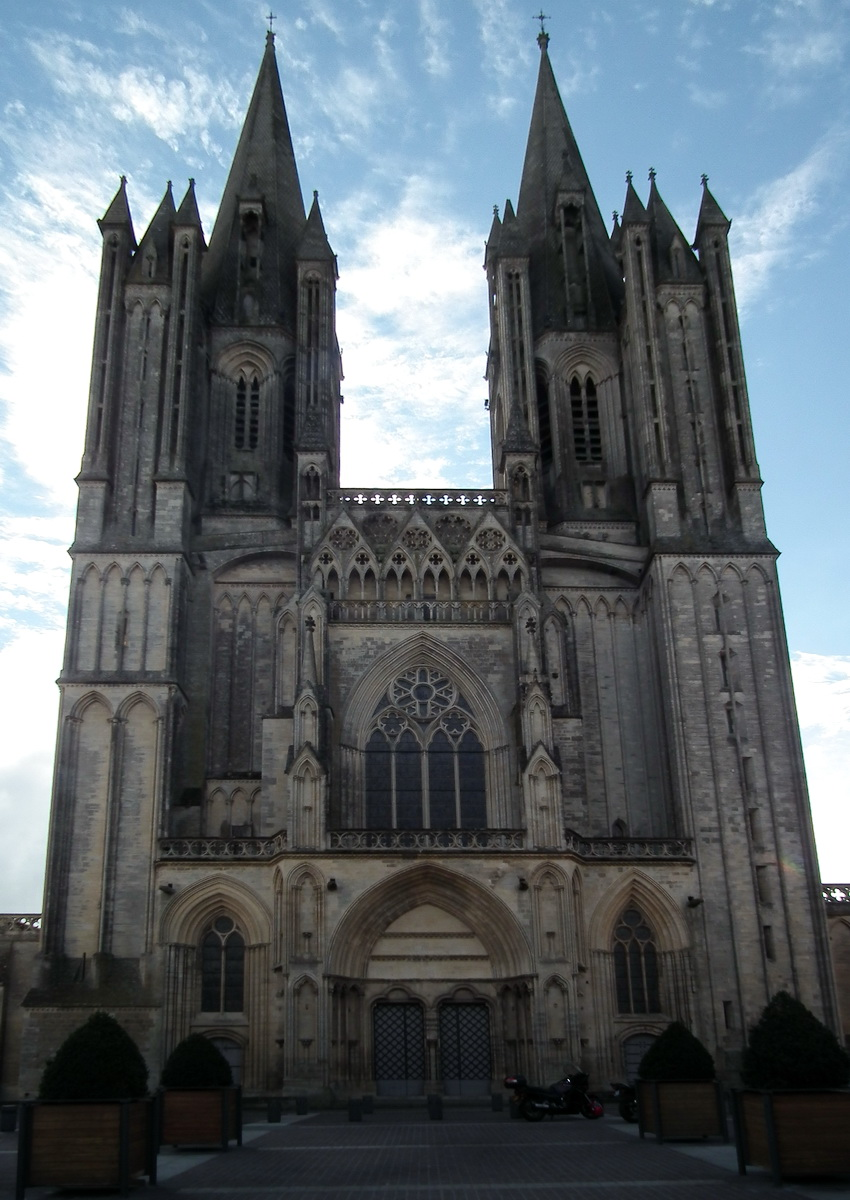
Geoffrey's great church is now a part of Coutances Cathedral, Coutances, France

De Montbray, from his name, was apparently from Montbrai, Manche, in the arrondissement of Saint-Lô in the Basse-Normandie region of the former Duchy of Normandy.

In 1049 he obtained the see of Coutances (Latin: Constantiensis), arranged by his brother Malger (see Mowbray). He was consecrated at Rouen on 12 March 1049, presumably by Mauger who was Archbishop of Rouen at that time. Later that year at the Council of Reims he was accused of simony, in other words, of having purchased his bishopric. In a skilful defence, Geoffrey claimed that without his knowledge his brother bought the bishopric for him. (Note: The seller was almost certainly Duke William. He owned most if not all of Coutances at the time. At the Council of Reims Geoffrey stated that when he heard of the transaction he refused his ordination and tried to flee. So his defence was that he was thrust into the office by force. See: John Le Patourel, 'Geoffrey of Montbray, Bishop of Countances, 1049-1093', The English Historical Review, Vol. 59, No. 234 (May, 1944), pp. 133-34, p. 134 n. 1.) He was allowed to keep his see on giving of an oath of his good faith.

However irregular his election to the bishopric, Geoffrey discovered his new diocese was in very poor condition. For nearly a century the church in the Cotentin had not recovered from destruction at the hands of the Northmen. There was obstinate paganism, few canons, and no books, bibles, or ornamentation. A long line of bishops before him had resided at Rouen or Saint-Lô, and being so remote from the diocese little had been accomplished in restoring the see. The few relics that former clerics managed to save along with the bodies of two former bishops, St. Lô and St. Rumpharius († c. 586) had been kept at the church of St. Sauveur in Rouen, given to Bishop Theoderic of Coutances by count Rollo as a temporary cathedral.

He was present at the battle of Hastings, and at his lord's subsequent coronation William was presented to his new subjects in English by Archbishop Aldred and in French by Bishop Geoffrey. His reward in England was a large fief scattered over 12 counties. He accompanied William on his visit to Normandy (1067). Having returned to England he took a leading role in suppressing the wave of English rebellions which erupted in the late summer of 1069. While William marched north against the uprisings in Mercia and Northumbria, Geoffrey gathered troops from the forces occupying London, Winchester and Salisbury and led them to victory against the rebels besieging Montacute Castle in September 1069. In 1075 he again took the field against the Revolt of the Earls, leading with Bishop Odo a large army against Ralph de Guader, the rebel Earl of Norfolk, besieging and capturing his stronghold at Norwich.

Meanwhile, the Conqueror had invested him with important judicial functions. In 1072 he presided over the great Kentish suit between the primate and Bishop Odo, and about the same time over those between the abbot of Ely and his despoilers, and between the Bishop of Worcester and the abbot of Ely, and he likely acted as a Domesday commissioner (1086), and was placed about the same time in charge of Northumberland. He also signed the Accord of Winchester.

The bishop, who attended the Conqueror's funeral, joined in the rising against William II of England in 1088, making Bristol, with which (as Domesday shows) he was closely connected and where he had built a strong castle, his base of operations. He burned Bath and ravaged Somerset, but submitted to the king before the end of the year. He appears to have been at Dover with William in January 1090, but, withdrawing to Normandy, died at Coutances in 1093. In his fidelity to Duke Robert he seems to have there held out for him against his brother Henry, when the latter obtained the Cotentin.

== His character ==
Orderic Vitalis wrote that de Montbray took pride in his noble birth and was better known for his military rather than his clerical ability; he knew more about marshalling soldiers in battle than teaching psalm-singing clerks. He was an integral part of the close-knit aristocratic group that formed the majority of the Norman episcopate during the reign of Duke William. David C. Douglas states that their principal filiations may be displayed within two very restricted and connected pedigrees.

== Additional references ==
- Edward Augustus Freeman, Norman Conquest and William Rufus

For original authorities:

- William of Poitiers
- Florence of Worcester
- Anglo-Saxon Chronicle
- William of Malmesbury's Gesta pontificum
- Lanfranc's works, ed. Giles
- Domesday Book
