= Courcy, Manche =

Courcy
- Commune
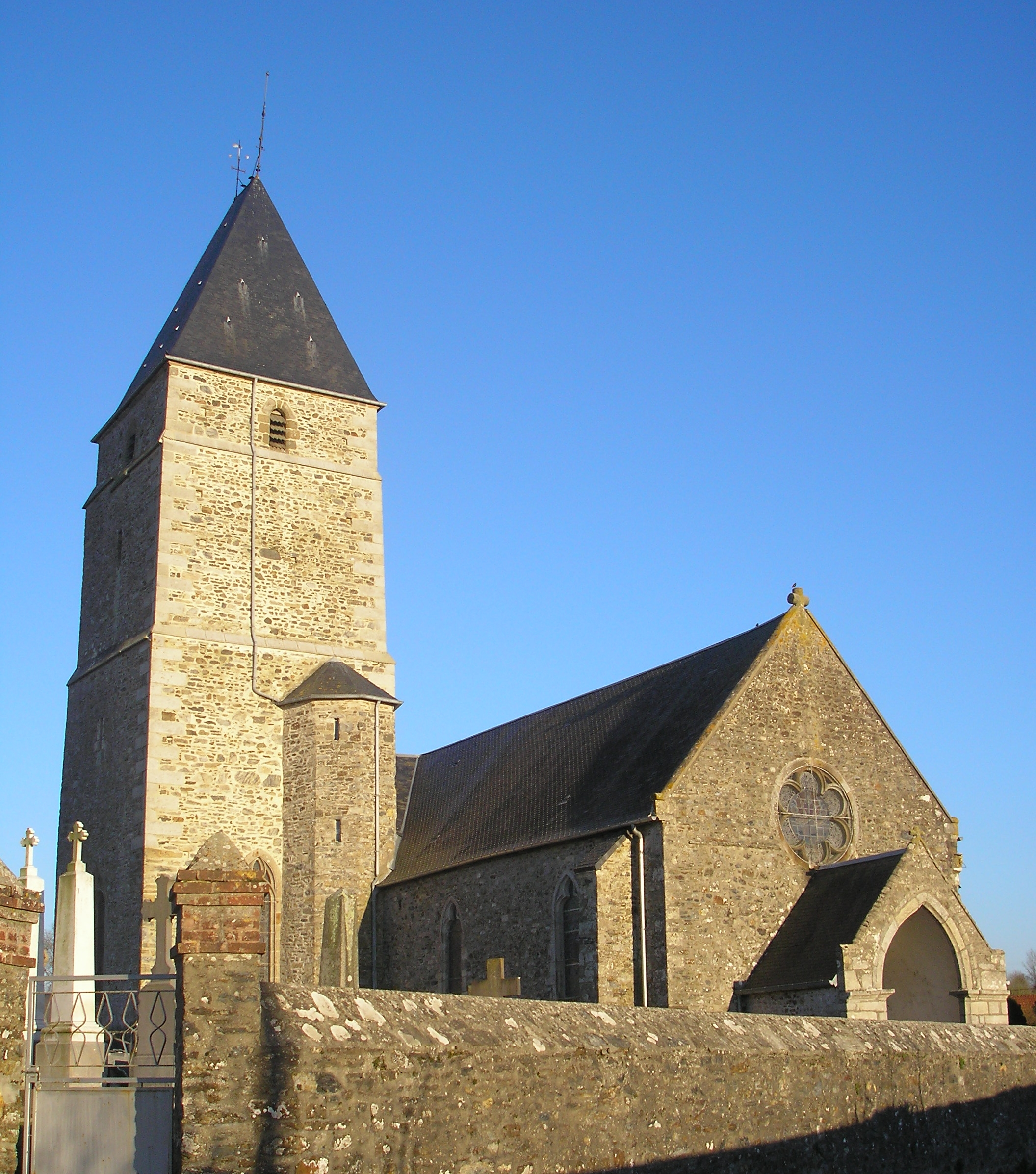
- The church of Saint-Lô
- Location of Courcy
- Location within France Location within Normandy
- Coordinates: 49°02′32″N 1°23′31″W
- Country: France
- Region: Normandy
- Department: Manche
- Arrondissement: Coutances
- Canton: Coutances
- Intercommunality: Coutances Mer et Bocage

Government
  - Mayor (2020–2026): Sébastien Grandin
- Area^{1}: 11.45 km^{2} (4.42 sq mi)
- Elevation: 90 m (300 ft)
- Highest elevation: 143 m (469 ft)
- Lowest elevation: 18 m (59 ft)
- Population (2023): 639
  - Density: 55.8/km^{2} (145/sq mi)
- Time zone: UTC+01:00 (CET)
  - Summer (DST): UTC+02:00 (CEST)
- INSEE/Postal code: 50145 /50200
- ^{1} French Land Register data, which excludes lakes, ponds, glaciers > 1 km^{2} (0.386 sq mi or 247 acres) and river estuaries.

Courcy (French pronunciation: [kuʁsi]) is a commune in the Manche department in Normandy in north-western France.

== See also ==
- Communes of the Manche department
