= Avranches Cathedral =

Cathedral in Manche, France

Coordinates: 48°41′16″N 1°21′52″W

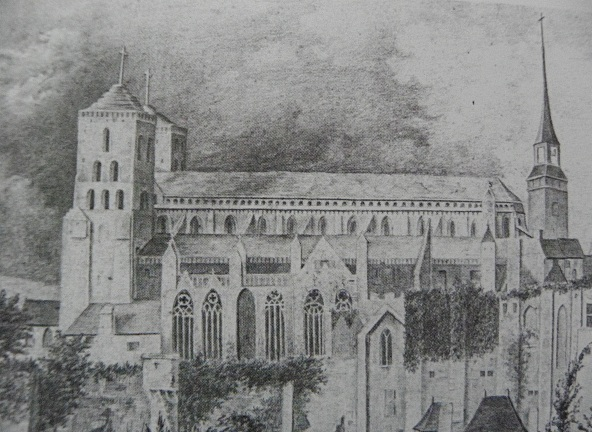
18th-century drawing of the cathedral

Avranches Cathedral (Cathédrale Saint-André d'Avranches) was once a Roman Catholic cathedral in Avranches in Normandy.

The seat of the Bishop of Avranches, it was a Gothic construction, notable as the place of the penance of Henry II of England in 1172 for the murder of Thomas Becket. It was destroyed completely during the French Revolution and the site remains unbuilt on.

The Diocese of Avranches was not reinstated after the revolution but under the Concordat of 1801 was instead amalgamated with that of Coutances to form the Diocese of Coutances and Avranches.

== Sources ==
- Ch.-A. de Beaurepaire, 1936: L'ancienne cathédrale d'Avranches (14pp). Bayeux: R.-P. Colas
- Daniel Levalet: "La cathédrale Saint-André et les origines chrétiennes d'Avranches" in Archéologie Médiévale, Vol. 12, 1982, pp. 107-153 doi:10.3406/ARCME.1982.1084
- Émile-Auber Pigeon, 1888: Le Diocèse d'Avranches (2 vols). Coutances: Imprimerie de Salettes
- François Saint-James and David Nicolas-Méry: "Quelques observations sur la cathédrale Saint-André d'Avranches" in Revue de l'Avranchin et du pays de Granville, Vol. 90, No. 434, March 2013
- François Saint-James, Erik Follain and David Nicolas-Méry: 2La cathédrale Saint-André d'Avranches. Renaissance d'un édifice perdu" dans Patrimoine normand, No. 93, April-May-June 2015
