= Jazz sous les pommiers =

Music festival in Coutances, France

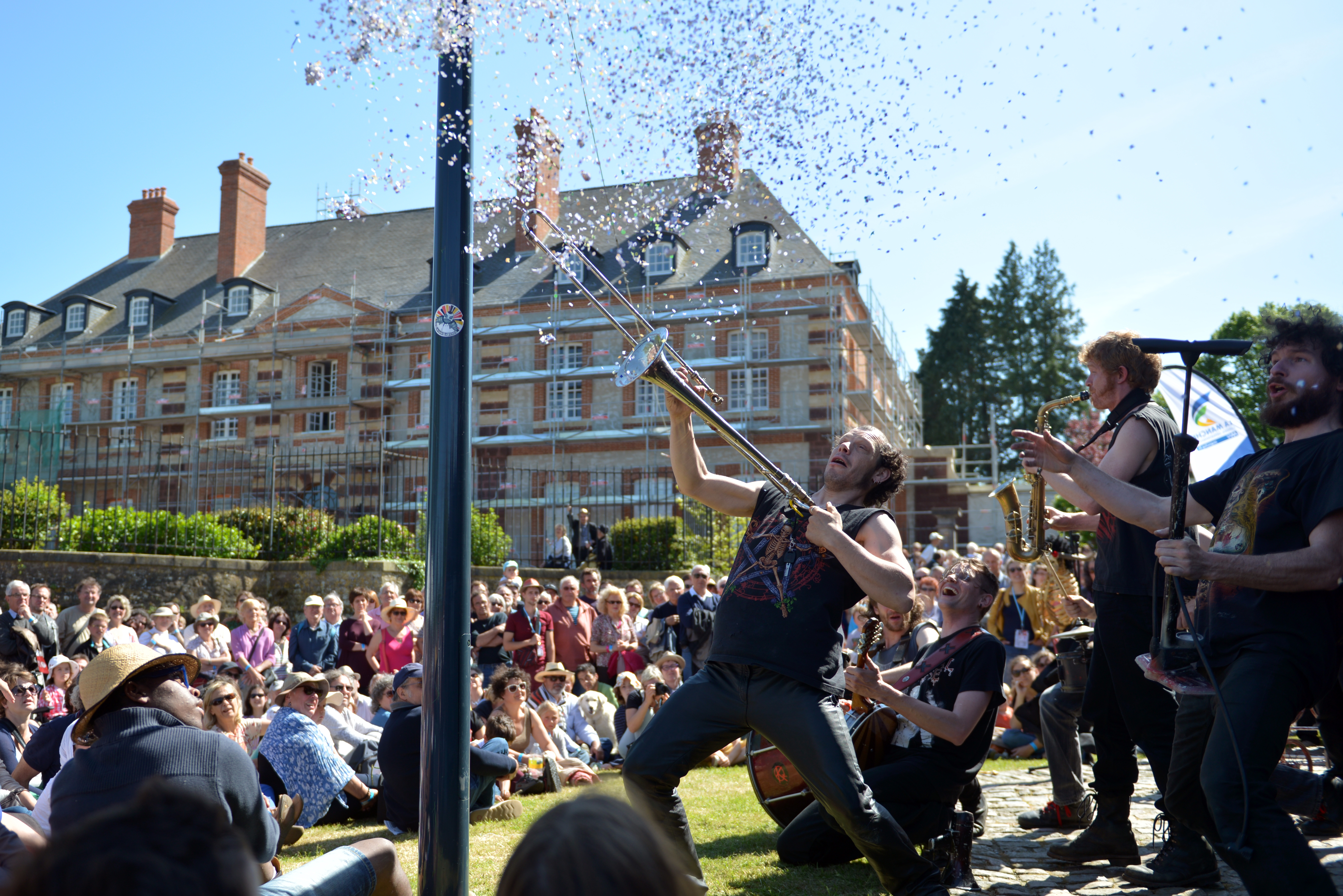
JSLP2015

Jazz sous les pommiers ("Jazz under the apple trees") is an annual week-long jazz festival in Coutances, France. The festival was first held in 1982, and is usually staged during the Feast of the Ascension, in May.

The festival was started by Thierry Giard and Gérard Houssin. By 2006, more than 1,000 concerts had been held. The festival of 2010 was attended by 37,000 spectators. In 2011, the festival celebrated its 30th anniversary by inviting musicians from previous festivals. The week ended with a "Folle Parade" (Crazy Parade) through the centre of Coutances.
