= De la Cour =

De la Cour is a French-language surname, meaning "of the court". The alternative forms Delacour and Delacourt were used by a Huguenot refugee who settled in Portarlington, County Laois, Ireland, as well as his descendants who later moved to County Cork and then to England.

== De la Cour ==
- Didier de La Cour (1550–1623), French Benedictine monk
- Claude-Michel Bégon de la Cour (1683–1748), French colonial military officer
- Charles-Joseph Mathon de la Cour (1738–1793), French art critic
- Ethel De la Cour (1869–1957), British educator
- Joseph De La Cour (1894–1967), American politician
- Michaela Dornonville de la Cour (born 1961), Swedish pop singer
- Henric de la Cour (born 1974), Swedish songwriter
- Adam de la Cour (born 1979), British composer
- Anne Cecilie de la Cour (born 1993), Danish handball player

== Delacour ==
- William Delacour (1700–1767), French painter
- Alfred Delacour (1817–1883), French playwright and librettist
- Reginald B. DeLacour (1886–1948), American general
- Jean Théodore Delacour (1890–1985), French-born American ornithologist
- Marcelle Delacour (fl. 1935), French table tennis player
- Yves Delacour (1930–2014), French rower
- Josephine White deLacour (1849–1929), American doctor
- Perrine Delacour (born 1994), French golfer

Fictional characters

- Fleur Delacour, from the Harry Potter series
- Gabrielle Delacour, younger sister of Fleur Delacour

== De la Court and Delacourt ==
- Pieter de la Court (1618–1685), Dutch economist
- Petronella de la Court (1624–1707), Dutch art collector
- Charles Delacourt-Smith, Baron Delacourt-Smith (1917–1972), British trade unionist and Labour Party politician
- Grégoire Delacourt (born 1960), French advertiser and writer
- Marianne Delacourt, pen name of Marianne de Pierres (born 1961), Australian science fiction writer
- Susan Delacourt (fl. 1982–present), Canadian political journalist
- Benjamin Delacourt (born 1985), French footballer

Fictional characters

- Rainn Delacourt, from the 2022 film Jurassic World Dominion

== See also ==
- La Cour, a similar surname
