= La Cour =

La Cour is a French-language surname meaning "the court". People with this surname include:

- Ask la Cour, Danish ballet dancer
- Emil La Cour (born 1991), Danish footballer
- Janus la Cour (1837–1909), Danish painter
- Leonard La Cour (1907–1984), British cytologist
- Lise la Cour (1944–2016), Danish ballerina
- Poul la Cour (1846–1908), Danish scientist
- Niels la Cour (born 1944), Danish composer
- Nina LaCour, American author

== See also ==
- De la Cour, a similar surname
