= Coutances =

Commune in Normandy, north-western France

- Subprefecture and commune
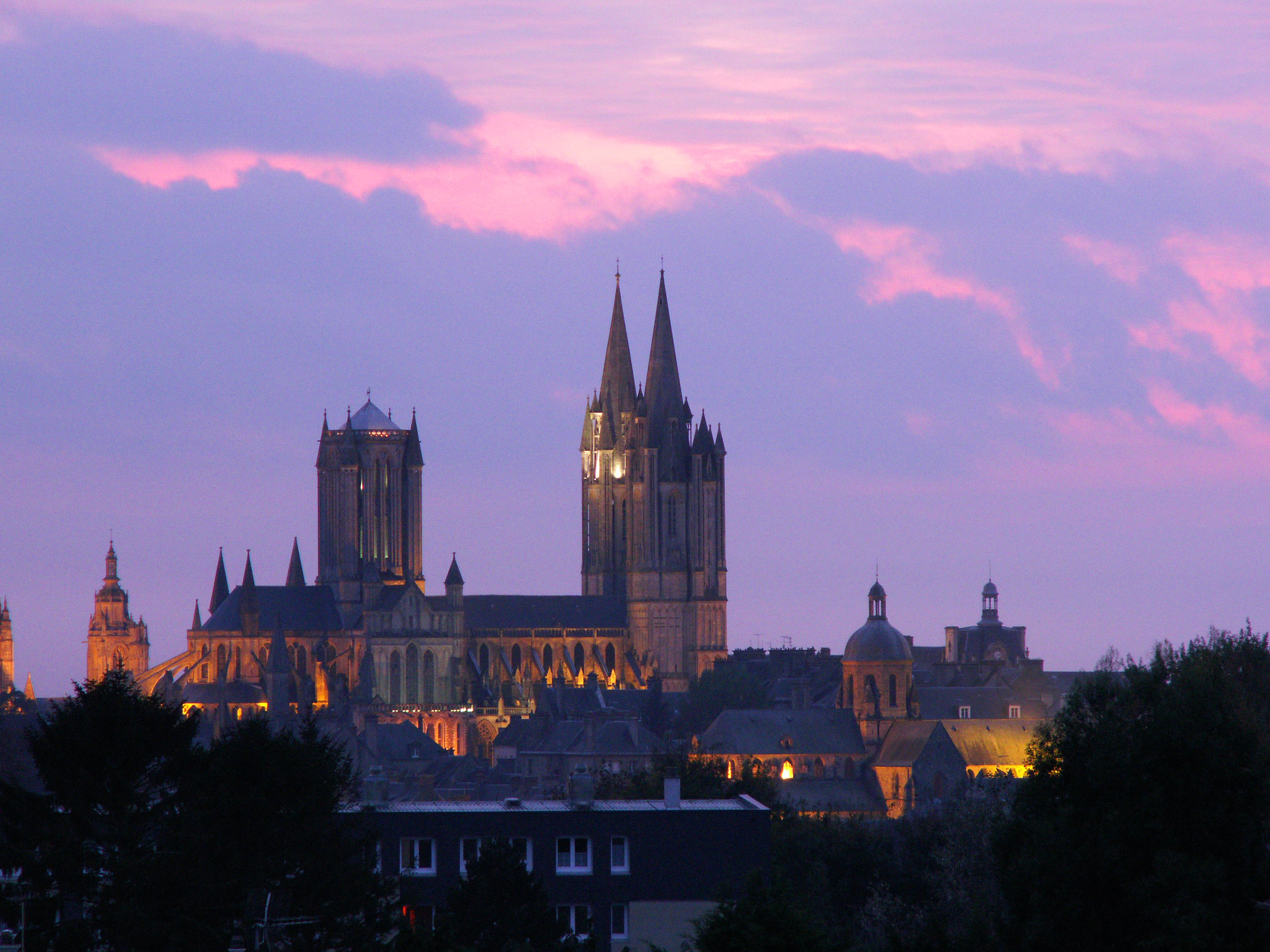
- Coutances Cathedral

- Coat of arms
- Location of Coutances
- Location within France Location within Normandy
- Coordinates: 49°03′N 1°26′W
- Country: France
- Region: Normandy
- Department: Manche
- Arrondissement: Coutances
- Canton: Coutances
- Intercommunality: Coutances Mer et Bocage

Government
  - Mayor (2020–2026): Jean-Dominique Bourdin
- Area^{1}: 12.51 km^{2} (4.83 sq mi)
- Highest elevation: 150 m (490 ft)
- Lowest elevation: 12 m (39 ft)
- Population (2023): 8,321
  - Density: 665.1/km^{2} (1,723/sq mi)
- Time zone: UTC+01:00 (CET)
  - Summer (DST): UTC+02:00 (CEST)
- INSEE/Postal code: 50147 /50200
- ^{1} French Land Register data, which excludes lakes, ponds, glaciers > 1 km^{2} (0.386 sq mi or 247 acres) and river estuaries.

Coutances (French pronunciation: [kutɑ̃s]; Norman: Couotaunches) is a commune in the Manche department in Normandy in north-western France.

== History ==
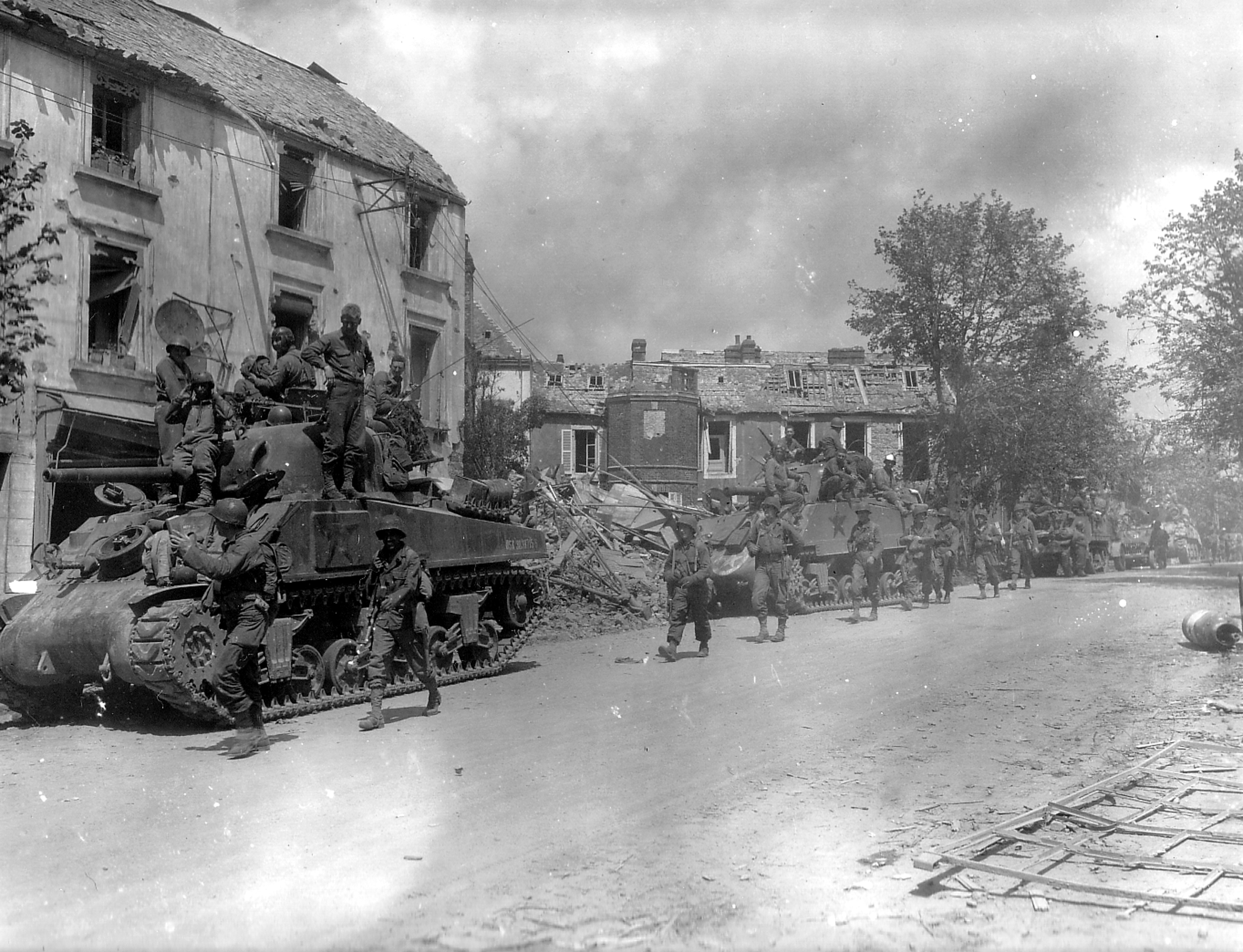
American armored and infantry forces pass through Coutances, France, in July 1944

The capital of the Unelli, a Gaulish tribe, the town was given the name of Constantia in 298 during the reign of Roman Emperor Constantius Chlorus. The surrounding region, called in Latin the pagus Constantinus, subsequently became known as the Cotentin Peninsula.

The town was destroyed by the invading Normans in 866; they later established settlements and incorporated the whole peninsula into the Duchy of Normandy in 933.

On 17 July 1944, during the Battle of Normandy during World War II, the city was bombed during the Allied offensive against the occupying Germans.

== Geography ==
=== Climate ===
Coutances has an oceanic climate (Köppen climate classification Cfb). The average annual temperature in Coutances is 11.2 °C (52.2 °F). The average annual rainfall is 1,061.2 mm (41.78 in) with December as the wettest month. The temperatures are highest on average in August, at around 17.5 °C (63.5 °F), and lowest in January, at around 5.5 °C (41.9 °F). The highest temperature ever recorded in Coutances was 38.9 °C (102.0 °F) on 5 August 2003; the coldest temperature ever recorded was −14.4 °C (6.1 °F) on 17 January 1985.

Climate data for Coutances (1991–2020 normals, extremes 1974–present)
Month	Jan	Feb	Mar	Apr	May	Jun	Jul	Aug	Sep	Oct	Nov	Dec	Year
Record high °C (°F)	15.5 (59.9)	21.5 (70.7)	24.6 (76.3)	26.9 (80.4)	30.5 (86.9)	34.4 (93.9)	39.5 (103.1)	38.9 (102.0)	33.0 (91.4)	28.6 (83.5)	21.9 (71.4)	16.6 (61.9)	39.5 (103.1)
Mean daily maximum °C (°F)	8.8 (47.8)	9.6 (49.3)	12.0 (53.6)	14.7 (58.5)	17.8 (64.0)	20.6 (69.1)	22.5 (72.5)	22.5 (72.5)	20.3 (68.5)	16.4 (61.5)	12.3 (54.1)	9.4 (48.9)	15.6 (60.1)
Daily mean °C (°F)	6.0 (42.8)	6.3 (43.3)	8.2 (46.8)	10.3 (50.5)	13.3 (55.9)	16.1 (61.0)	17.9 (64.2)	17.9 (64.2)	15.8 (60.4)	12.7 (54.9)	9.2 (48.6)	6.5 (43.7)	11.7 (53.1)
Mean daily minimum °C (°F)	3.2 (37.8)	3.0 (37.4)	4.4 (39.9)	5.9 (42.6)	8.8 (47.8)	11.6 (52.9)	13.4 (56.1)	13.4 (56.1)	11.3 (52.3)	9.1 (48.4)	6.0 (42.8)	3.6 (38.5)	7.8 (46.0)
Record low °C (°F)	−14.4 (6.1)	−13.0 (8.6)	−5.4 (22.3)	−2.5 (27.5)	−1.1 (30.0)	2.7 (36.9)	4.6 (40.3)	3.9 (39.0)	0.5 (32.9)	−2.8 (27.0)	−5.5 (22.1)	−7.1 (19.2)	−14.4 (6.1)
Average precipitation mm (inches)	109.6 (4.31)	86.5 (3.41)	75.6 (2.98)	71.7 (2.82)	68.9 (2.71)	64.5 (2.54)	67.3 (2.65)	79.6 (3.13)	82.4 (3.24)	120.0 (4.72)	122.3 (4.81)	144.4 (5.69)	1,092.8 (43.02)
Average precipitation days (≥ 1.0 mm)	16.6	13.5	12.6	11.4	9.9	9.7	10.1	10.1	11.0	14.6	16.8	17.2	153.5
Source: Meteociel

== Population ==
Historical population
Year	Pop.	±% p.a.
1968	9,061	—
1975	9,869	+1.23%
1982	9,930	+0.09%
1990	9,715	−0.27%
1999	9,522	−0.22%
2007	9,483	−0.05%
2012	9,114	−0.79%
2017	8,501	−1.38%
2023	8,321	−0.36%
Source: INSEE

== Sights ==
Coutances Cathedral is one of the major buildings of Norman architecture and contains a chapel and stained glass dedicated to Saint Marcouf. The bishop of Coutances exercised ecclesiastical jurisdiction over the Channel Islands until the Reformation, despite the secular division of Normandy in 1204. The final rupture occurred definitively in 1569.

Coutances houses a well-known botanical garden and an art museum.

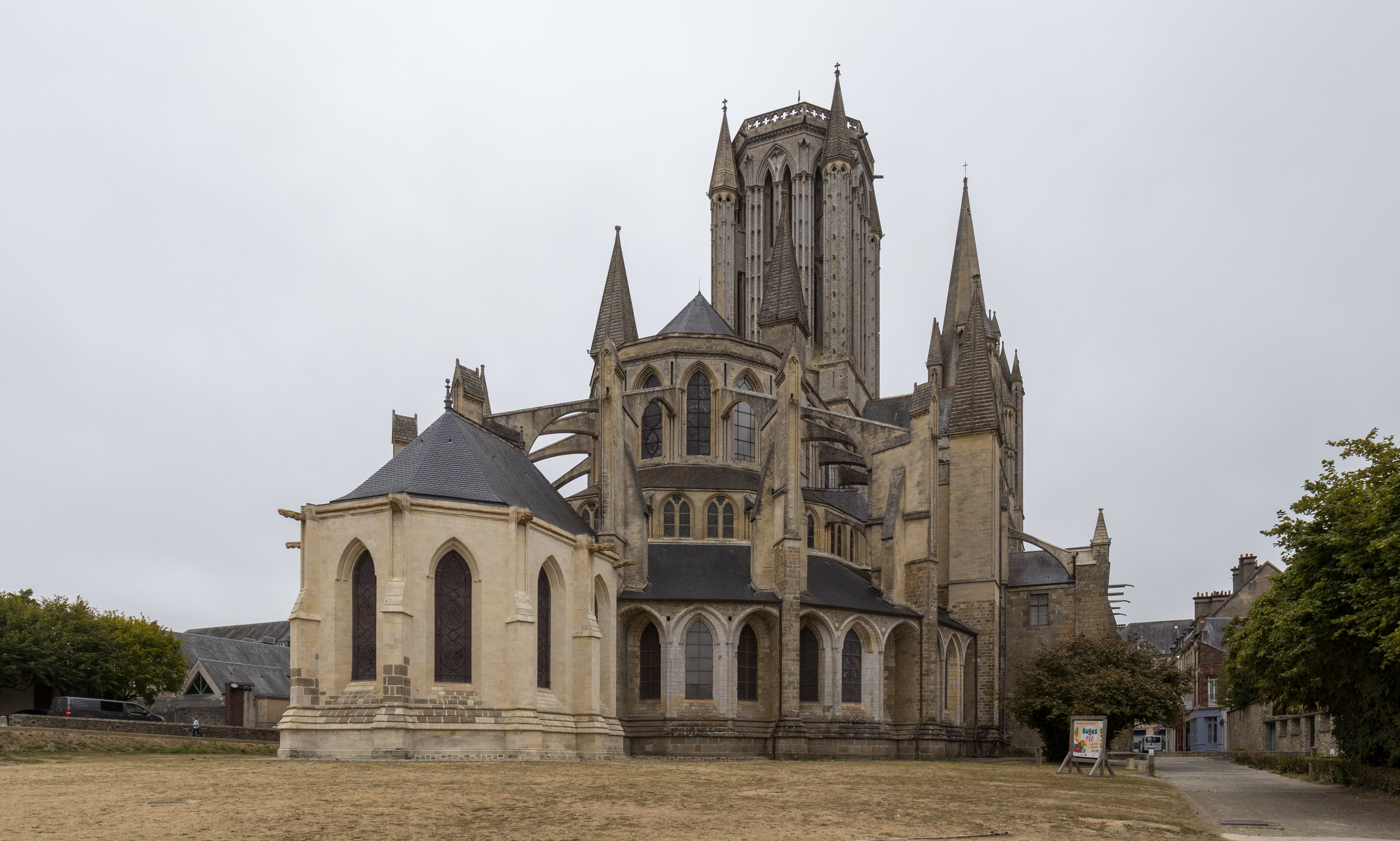
Notre-Dame Cathedral

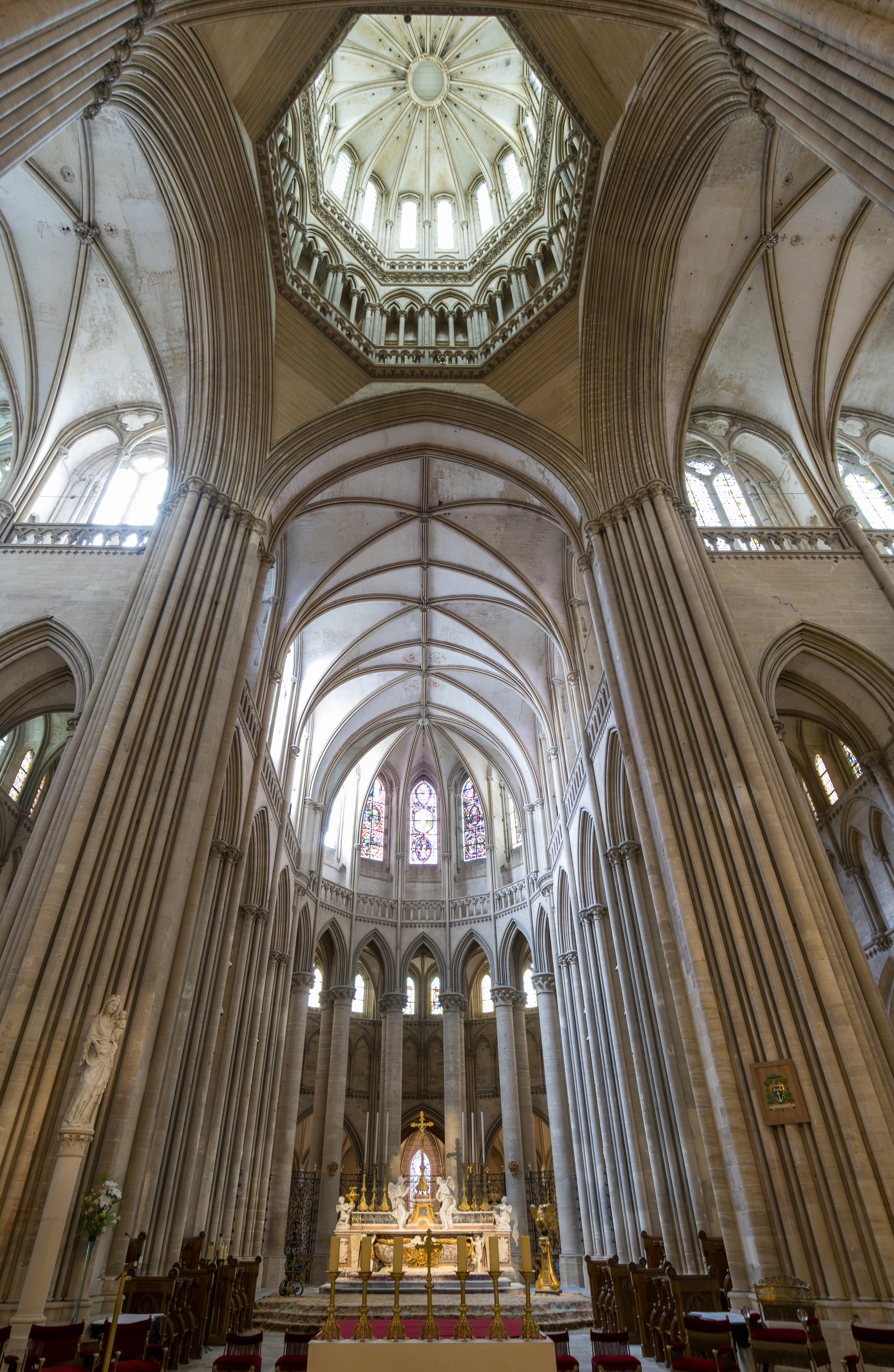
The Choir

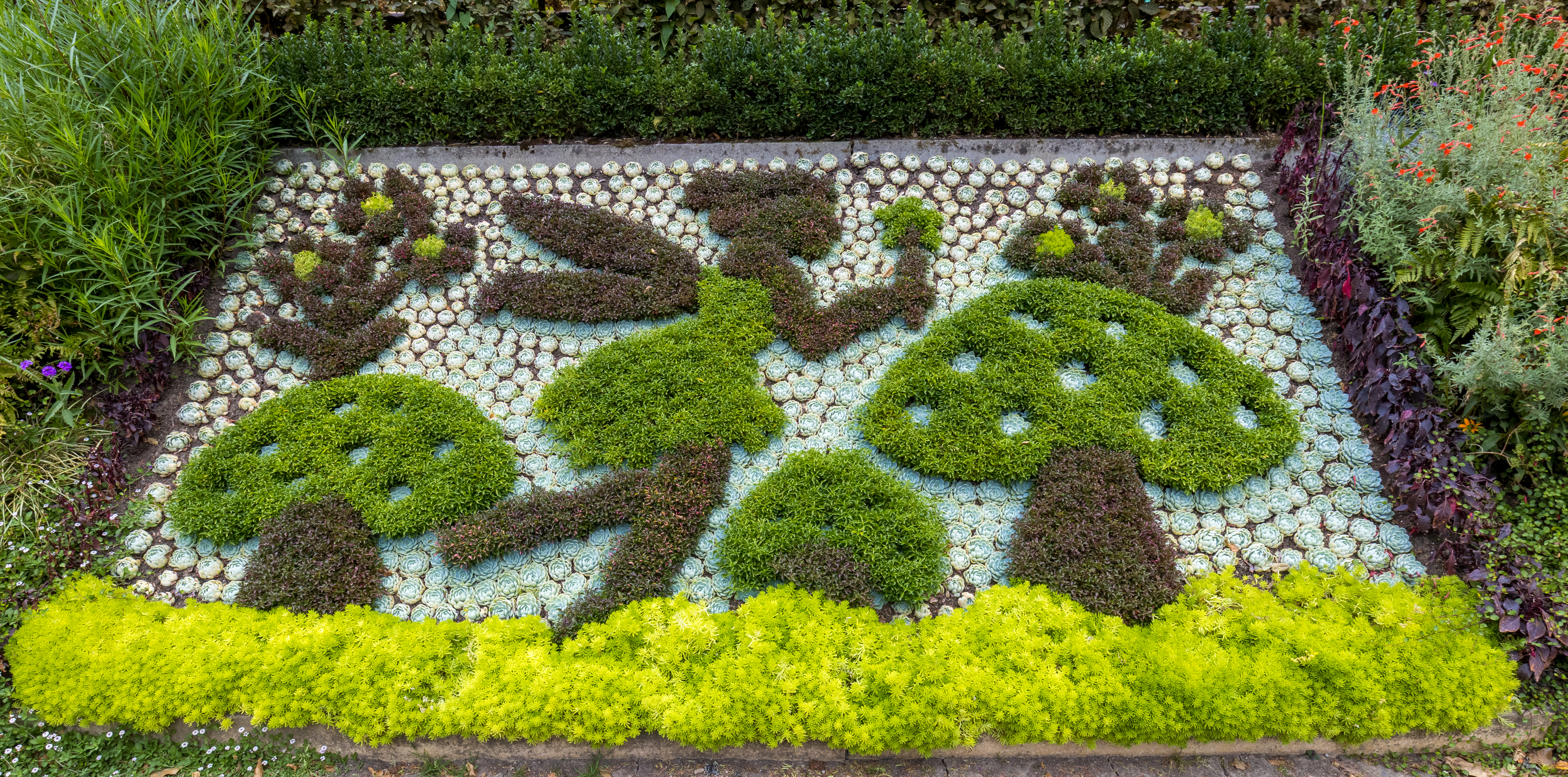
The mosaic in the Botanical Garden

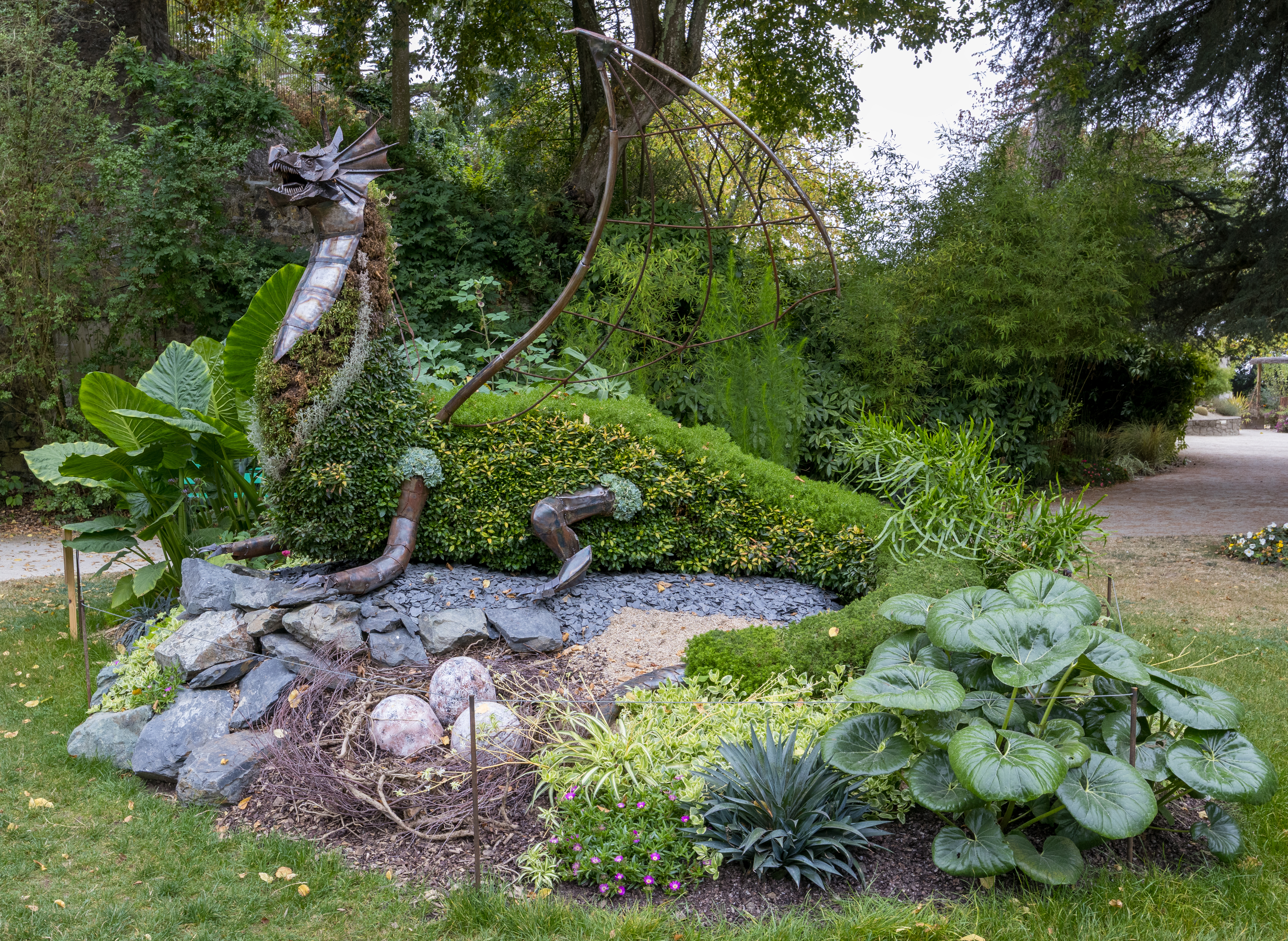
The dragon in the Coutances Botanical Garden (Jardin des Plantes)

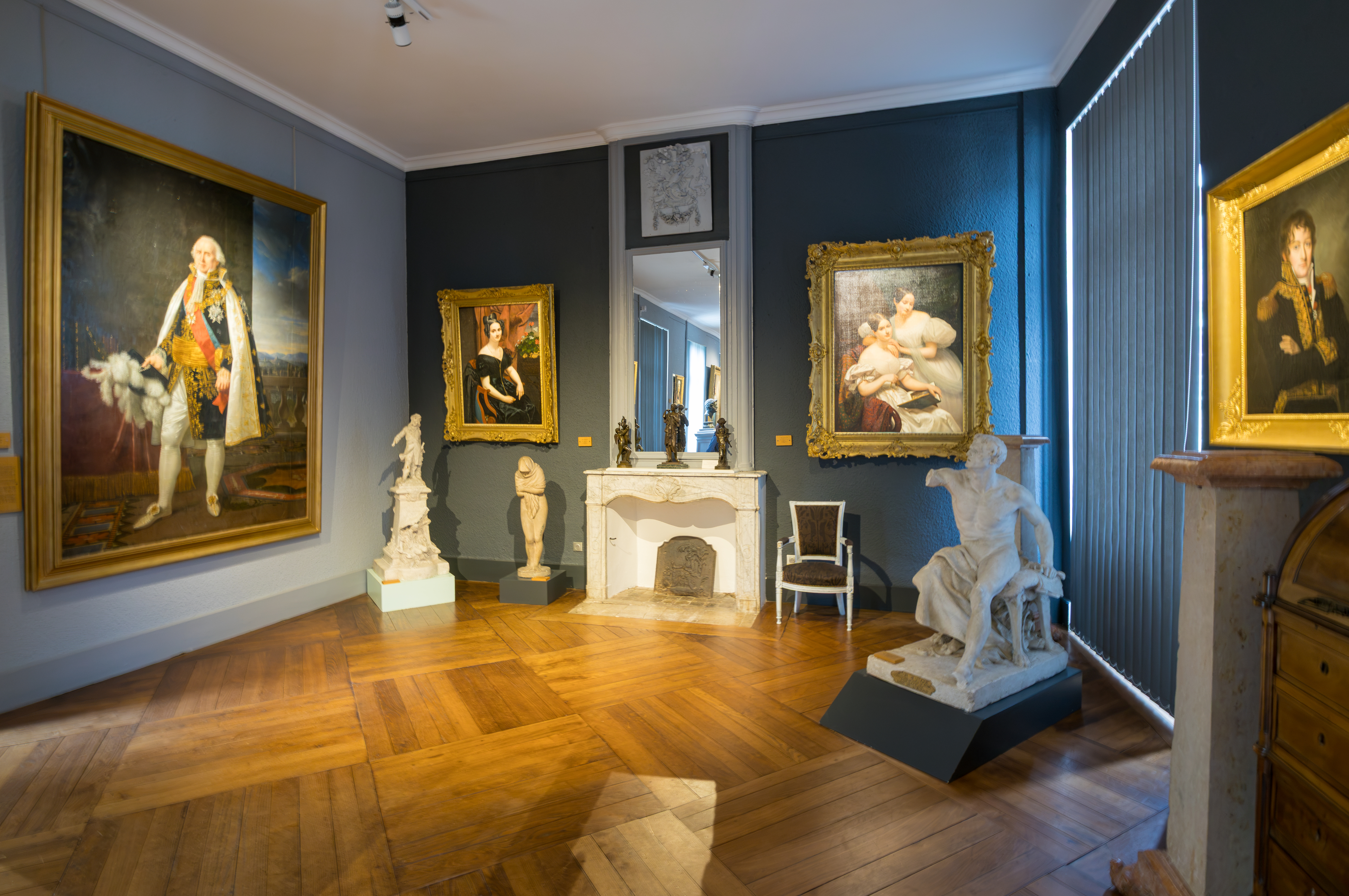
Quesnel-Morinière Museum

== Sport ==
Coutances has a football club ES Coutances who play at the Stade Paul-Maundrell.

== Jazz festival ==
Coutances is the location of Jazz sous les pommiers ("Jazz under the apple trees"), an annual jazz festival held since 1982. The festival traditionally takes place during the week of Ascension.

== International relations ==
Coutances is twinned with:

Ochsenfurt in Germany; Troina in Sicily, Italy; Ilkley in England, United Kingdom	(United Kingdom) Saint Ouen in Jersey, Channel Islands; La Pocatière in Québec, Canada

=== Heraldry ===
Arms of Coutances	The arms of Coutances are blazoned : Azure, in fess 3 columns argent, and on a chief gules, a leopard Or armed and langued azure.

== See also ==
- Roman Catholic Diocese of Coutances
