= Saint-Martin-des-Champs =

Saint-Martin-des-Champs is the name of several communes in France, each named for Martin of Tours:

- Saint-Martin-des-Champs, Cher
- Saint-Martin-des-Champs, Finistère
- Saint-Martin-des-Champs, Manche
- Saint-Martin-des-Champs, Seine-et-Marne
- Saint-Martin-des-Champs, Yvelines
- Saint-Martin-des-Champs, Yonne

== See also ==
- Saint-Martin-des-Champs Priory, a former monastery in Paris
- Saint-Martin-aux-Champs, a commune in the Marne département
- Saint Martin (disambiguation)
- St Martin-in-the-Fields (disambiguation)
