= Château de Bayeux =

Former castle in Bayeux, Normandy, France

- Bayeux, Normandy, France
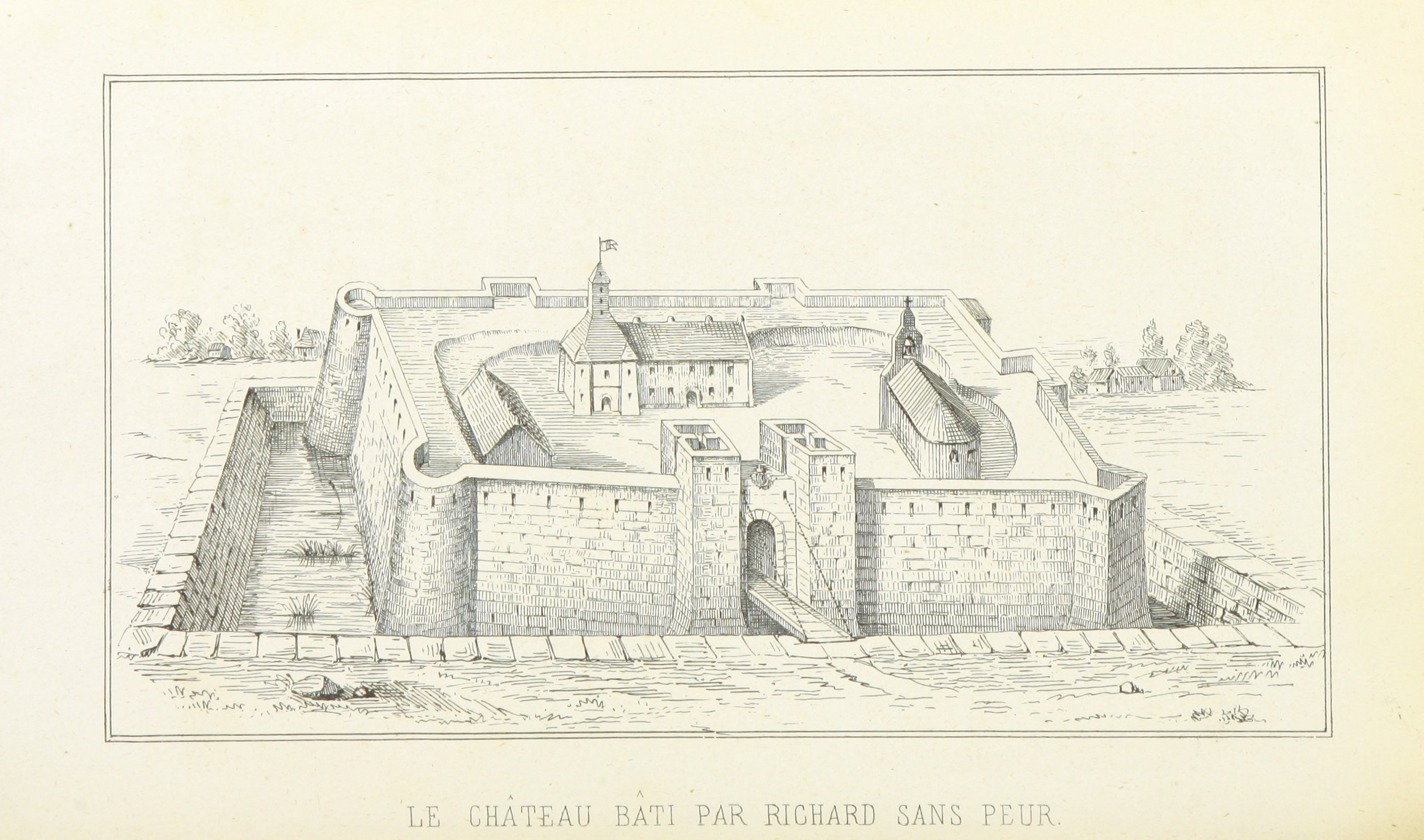
- Illustration of the castle

Site information
- Owner: Duke of Normandy

Location
- Coordinates: 49°16′46″N 0°42′10″W

Château de Bayeux was a castle in Bayeux, Normandy, France.

== History ==
Richard I of Normandy began construction of a castle at Bayeux in the 10th century. It became the residence of the Dukes of Normandy until they moved to Caen in c. 1066.

Bayeux was pillaged and sacked by Henry I of England in 1106. John of England lost the English lands in Normandy following their recapture by the French Crown in 1204. Philip II of France reinforced the fortifications in Normandy.

The castle was subjected to a number of sieges and captured on several occasions during the Hundred Years' War between France and England. It was finally taken by the French on 16 May 1450. The castle also suffered during the French Wars of Religion of the 16th century. The castle was still evident in the 18th century, however little remains exist.
