= Deanery =

Religious organization

A deanery (or decanate) is an ecclesiastical entity in the Catholic Church, the Eastern Orthodox Church, the Evangelical-Lutheran Churches (such as the Evangelical Church in Germany and the Church of Norway), and the Anglican Communion. A deanery is either the jurisdiction or residence of a dean.

The rural chapter is the body (college) comprising all the clergy of a deanery. It originated in the 13th century. It usually had administrative responsibility and the right to elect the dean.

== Catholic usage ==
In the Catholic Church, Can.374 §2 of the Code of Canon Law grants to bishops the possibility to join together several neighbouring parishes into special groups, such as vicariates forane, or deaneries.

Each deanery is headed by a vicar forane, also called a dean or archpriest, who is—according to the definition provided in canon 553—a priest appointed by the bishop after consultation with the priests exercising ministry in the deanery. Canon 555 defines the duties of a dean as:

- promotion and coordination of the common pastoral activity within the deanery;
- seeing that the clerics of the deanery lead a life in harmony with their state in life and perform their duties with diligence;
- seeing that religious functions follow Church norms;
- seeing that the good appearance of churches and sacred furnishings are maintained;
- seeing that parish books are correctly managed;
- seeing that the parish rectory is well maintained;
- seeing that clerics, following the norms of the diocese and the norms of Canon 272, attend theological lectures, meetings, or conferences;
- making sure that the priests of the deanery have access to spiritual helps and aid in difficult pastoral circumstances; and
- making sure that pastors in his deanery are well cared for when they are sick or dying.

Additionally, the dean must follow the particular norms of the diocese. Canon 555 also particularly mentions that a dean must visit the parishes of the district in accord with the regulations made by the diocesan bishop.

== Evangelical-Lutheran usage ==
Evangelical-Lutheran denominations, such as the Church of Norway, have deaneries, e.g. the Toten Deanery.

A traditionalist deanery within the Church of Norway, the Deanery of Strandebarm, became the Evangelical Lutheran Diocese of Norway in 2012.

== Anglican usage ==
In the Church of England and many other Anglican churches a deanery is a group of parishes forming a district within an archdeaconry. The more formal term, rural deanery, is less often used, though the superintendent of a deanery is the Rural Dean. Rural deaneries are very ancient and originally corresponded with the hundreds. The title "dean" (Latin decanus) may derive from the custom of dividing a hundred into ten tithings. In medieval times rural deans acted as officers of the diocesan bishop, but archdeacons gradually took over most of their duties. However, the office was revived during the 19th century. Modifications to deanery boundaries may be made according to the provisions of the Archdeaconries and Rural Deaneries Act 1874 (37 & 38 Vict. c. 63).

The deanery synod has a membership of all clergy who are licensed to a parish within the deanery, plus elected lay members from every parish. They were established in the 1970s.

The term is also often used to refer to the house, or official residence, of the dean of a cathedral. The term is also used to apply to the ecclesiastical districts of Jersey and Guernsey, which are Royal Peculiars and whose deans hold a status more nearly equivalent to an Archdeacon than a rural dean.

In the Episcopal Church, deaneries are synonymous with convocations and are headed by deans.

== Eastern Orthodox usage ==
Deaneries also exist in the Eastern Orthodox Church, where they are subdivisions of a diocese.

== See also ==
- Grand Doyenné of Avranches
