= Grand Doyenné of Avranches =

Secular medieval building in France

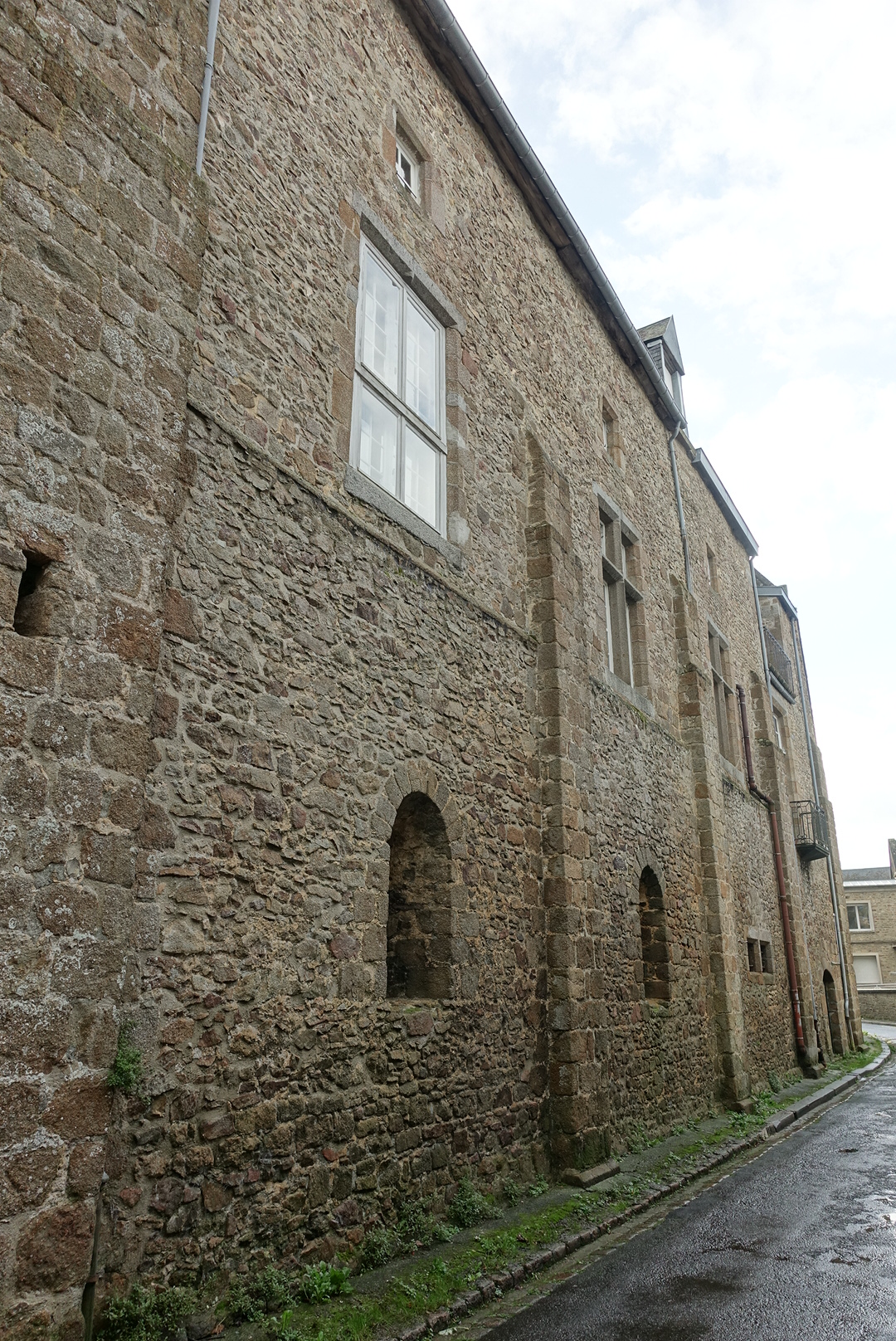
- Facade
- Location: 26 rue d'Auditoire 50300 Avranches, Avranches, Manche, France
- Coordinates: 48°41′18″N 1°21′48″W
- Type: Clergy house with Romanesque art style
- Width: 550 m^{2}
- Height: 13.5 m
- Opening date: 12th century
- Historical monument (2007)

The Grand Doyenné (in French: Grand Deanery), also known as the Subligny Manor, is a secular medieval building located in the French commune of Avranches, in the department of Manche in the Normandy region.

It is an infrequent example of secular medieval architecture preserved in the former Lower Normandy region, along with the room known as the "Échiquier" located within the walls of the Caen Castle.

The building, originally designed as a grand residence, served as the deanery of Avranches from the late 13th to the late 18th century. Following the French Revolution, it was sold as national goods, and various alterations have been made to it since then.

The building, which has transformed over the centuries to adapt to the needs of the time, has been the subject of academic studies mainly since the early 21st century. It has preserved many of its original features and is now regarded as a significant element of Norman architectural heritage, as stated by Nicolas-Méry.

The deanery is classified as a historical monument.

== Location ==
The deanery is located in Avranches, at 26 rue d'Auditoire, in the French department of Manche. The manor, visible from a distance, is situated "between the castle and the episcopal pole," on a high point of the medieval city, not far from the episcopal palace (Note: Nicolas-Méry 2003, p. 247) and the cathedral site.

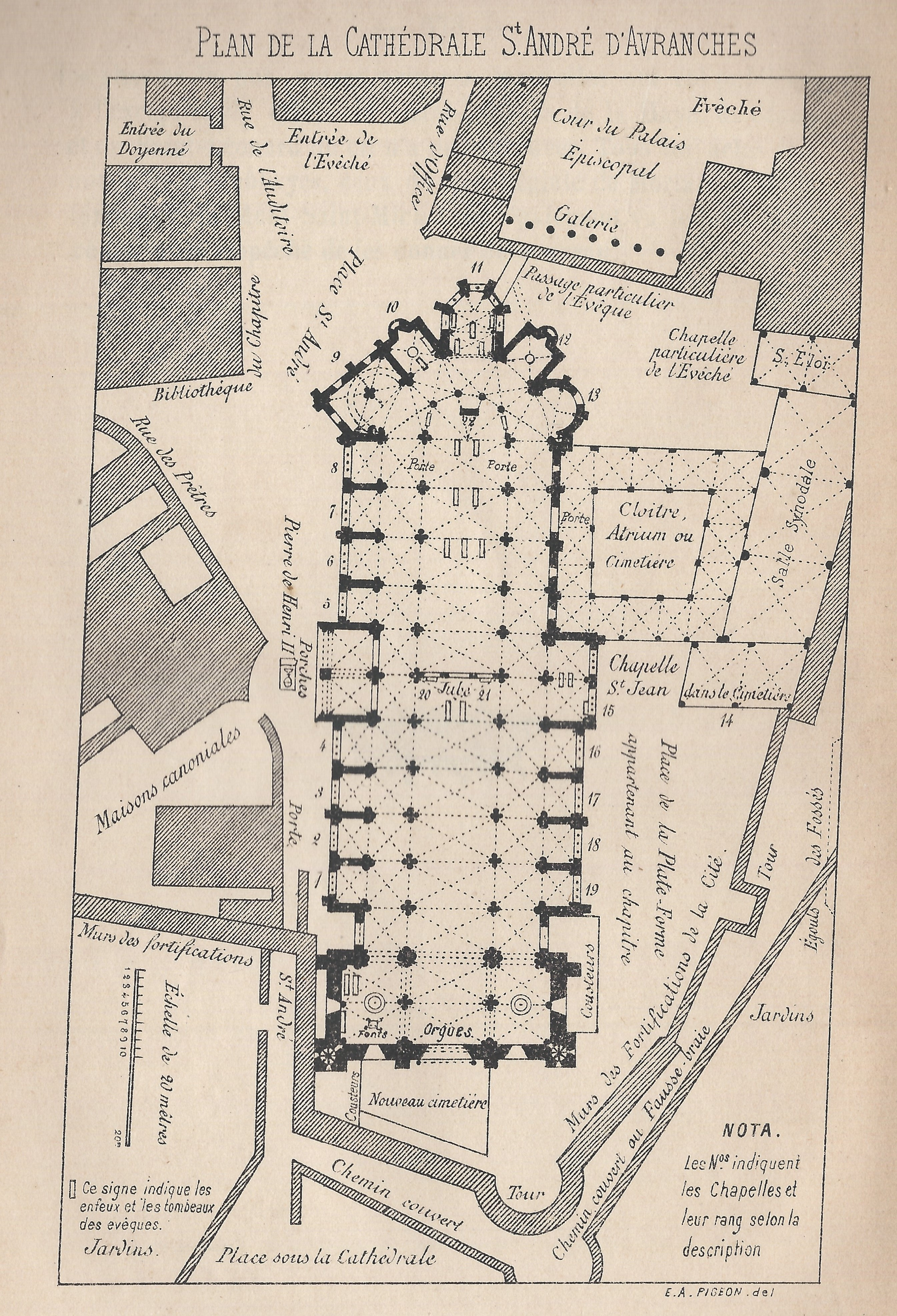
Plan of Avranches Cathedral from an 1888 publication, with the deanery entrance in the top left-hand corner.

== History ==
=== Origins ===
The building is believed to have been constructed in the mid-12th century for Hasculf of Subligny, the lord of Avranches and brother of Bishop Richard de Subligny, who founded the La Lucerne Abbey. It was built during a period of urban growth and dynamism in the second half of the 12th century.

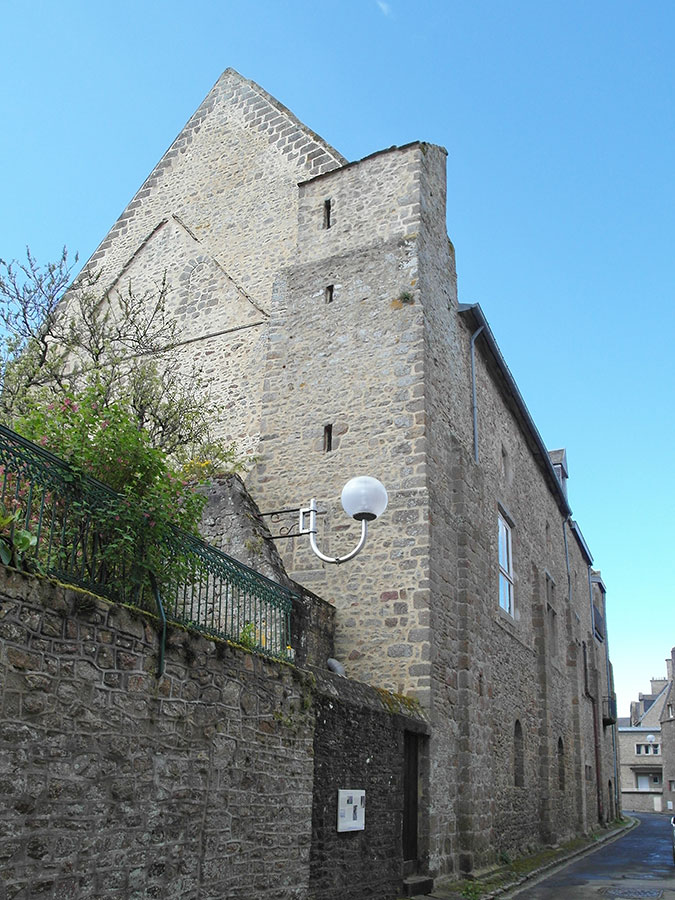
North facade and stair turret.

The building originally served a civilian purpose and was owned by the Paisnel family for "more than three generations." The Subligny family emerged in the aftermath of the upheavals in Anglo-Norman society following the sinking of the White Ship in 1120. The construction of the building required the bishop's approval and served as a grand display of the Subligny family's influence in the city, complementing the abbey located in the northern part of their domain. It is believed that the building may have accommodated Henry II Plantagenet and his retinue during the penance of 21 May 1172, following the assassination of Thomas Becket.

In the 12th century, the deanery was a state room of approximately 230 m^{2} situated above a vaulted hall, with a side aisle of 100 m^{2}. Around 1200, a building was constructed at the eastern gable, resembling a lordly dwelling of the "chamber-block" style. (Note: Nicolas-Méry 2003, p. 249) This type of seignioral living quarters, common in the Anglo-Norman region, featured a cellar and a chamber for the lord on the upper floor. Additionally, a separate building was designated for hosting receptions.

Before 1274, the building was owned by Jean Paisnel, the lord of Marcey and a descendant of the Subligny family. The building was transferred, either due to its deterioration or ruin or because of the "material decline [of the] family." Additionally, in the 13th century, the clergy of the city played an increasingly important role in urban development. During this time, the city fortifications were restored, and the boundaries of the upper town were established.

The building served as the seat of the Avranches deanery, as documented in a charter preserved in the Departmental Archives of Manche until the French Revolution. The original document dates back to the late 13th century and is known from a 14th-century copy. At that time, the building was in a state of disrepair and required extensive renovation work.

=== From the late Middle Ages to the French Revolution ===
Location of the deanery in the 18th century.

Significant work was carried out by Bishop Raoul de Thieuville and his successors from the late 13th century onwards, which included replacing the frame. The hall was subsequently used for chapter activities. Another addition made at the end of the 13th century was the Petit Doyenné, which was attached to the Grand Doyenné.

During the late Middle Ages, the building took on residential characteristics, common among many medieval structures. In the 16th century, the hall underwent renovations, including being divided into two levels with new openings and a new frame. Chimneys were added, along with a kitchen that had a lower section supported by the medieval gable wall. This kitchen still features a fireplace dating back to the early 16th century.

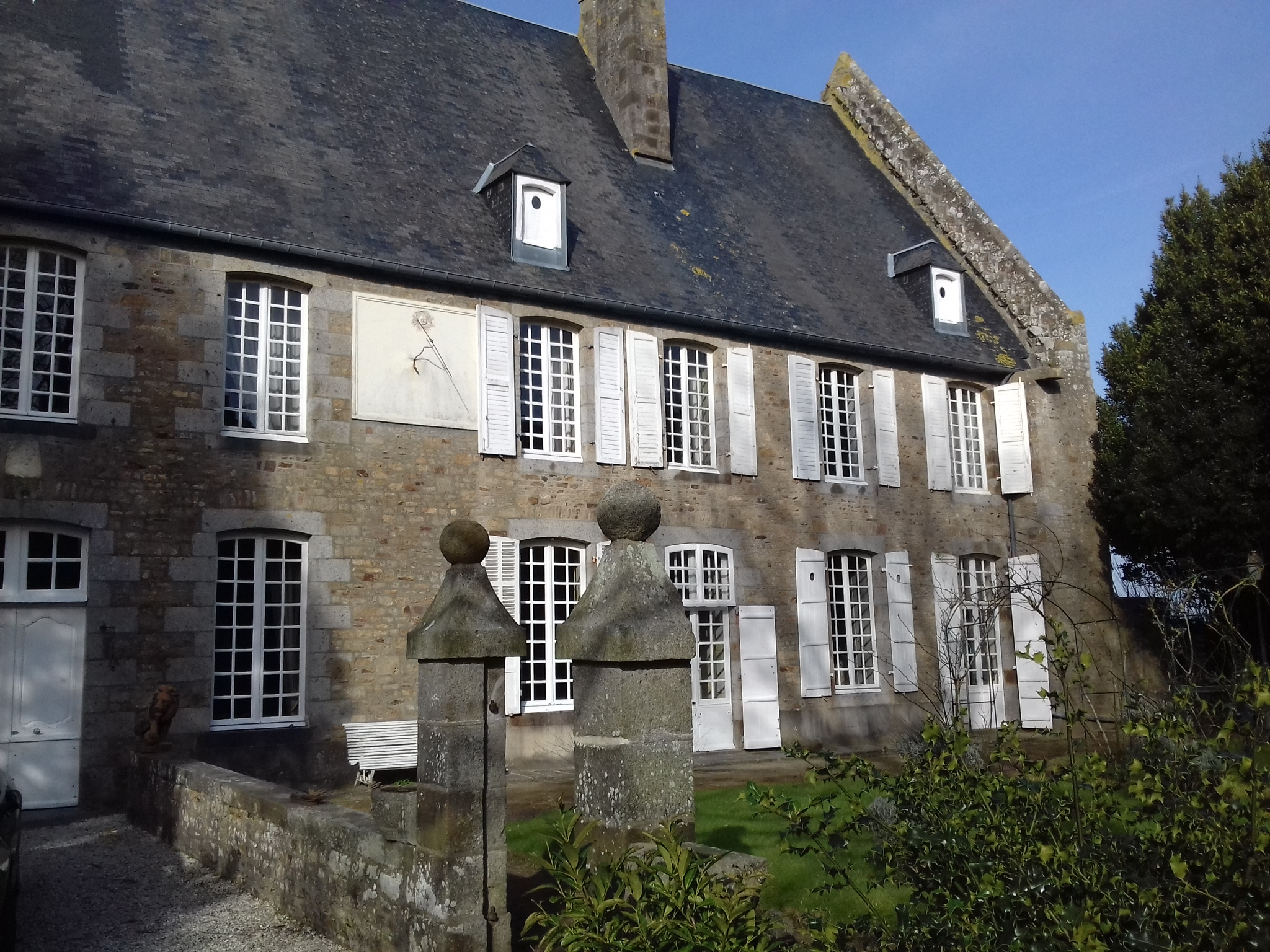
The garden facade was rebuilt in 1762.

The building hosted James II Stuart in 1690. Significant work took place in the second half of the 18th century. The south facade was rebuilt in 1762, as evidenced by a chronogram on a stone, and the thickness of the wall was halved. The sponsor of these renovations was Dean Charles Colin de Contrisson, who arrived in 1761. He rearranged the living spaces at his own expense: the dean's apartments, "private and reception spaces," occupied the ground floor and were decorated with paneling and woodwork. The upper floor was designated for passing guests and their staff. The building thus transformed into "an 18th-century private mansion in a medieval envelope."

During the French Revolution, the site was sold as national goods and later used as a place of detention. Only the cellar of the building was used for this purpose, where the Avranches aristocrats of the fournée d'Avranches (Avranches Batch) (Note: The "Avranches Batch" refers to a series of arrests in 1793 led by Jean-Baptiste Le Carpentier, involving thirty-two individuals, including twenty-nine nobles, who were suspected of holding counter-revolutionary views.) were detained before being transferred to Paris. They managed to avoid the guillotine after Robespierre's downfall and were eventually released in October 1794.

=== Contemporary era ===
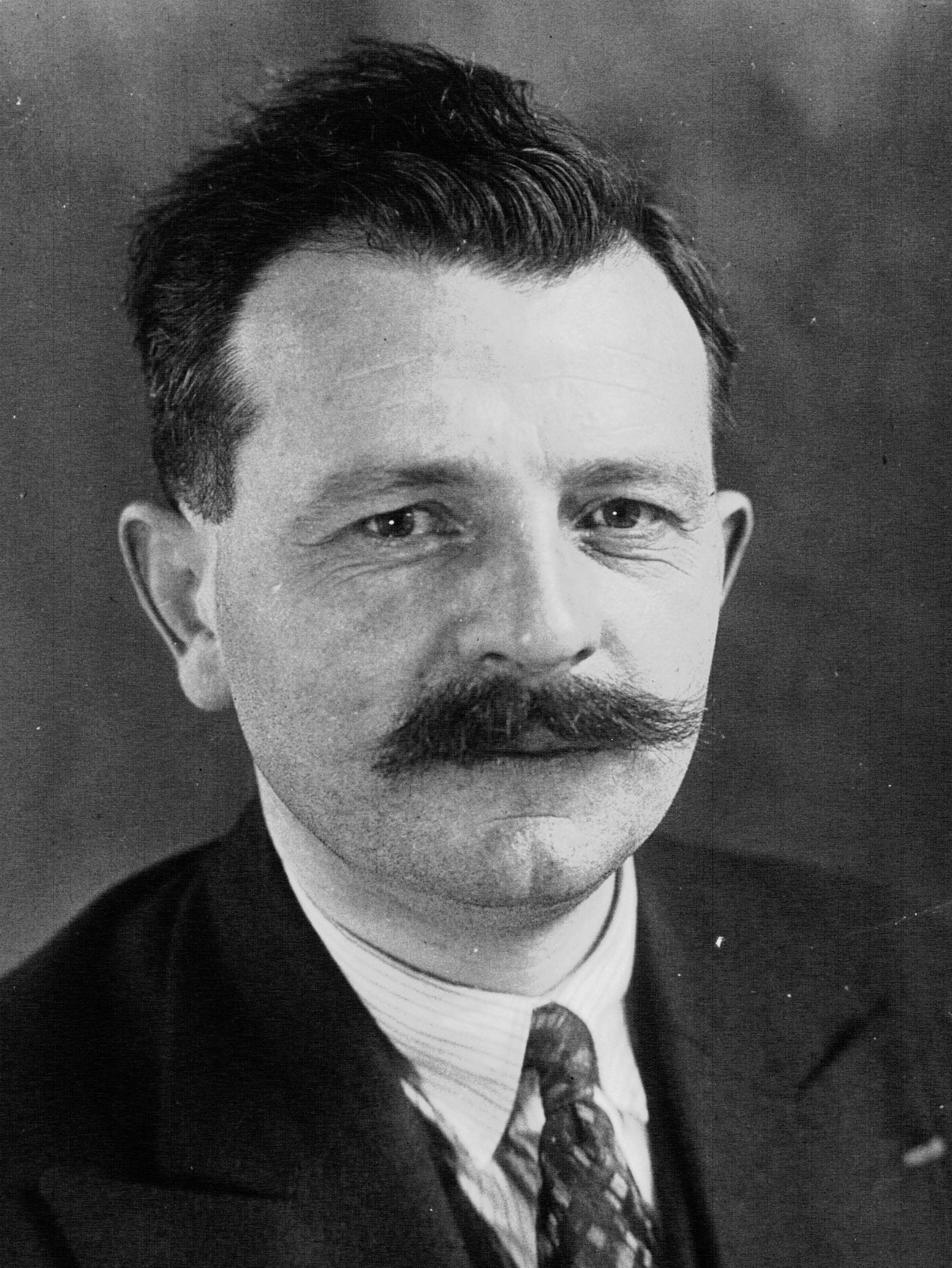
Maxime Fauchon (1894–1980), Member of Parliament and owner of the building for a long period in the 20th century.

The Deanery was sold in Year IV. The Petit Doyenné was destroyed between the late 18th and early 19th centuries.

During May 1940, the deanery functioned as a storage facility for manuscripts and valuable books from the Avranches library under the ownership of deputy Maxime Fauchon. Following the city's occupation on 20 June, records indicate that Germans, including a university professor who later perished on the Russian front, accessed the books for consultation by the year's end. In June 1942, the books were relocated to Ussé Castle, where they remained until 1946. Despite the Battle of Normandy's fierce fighting, the Deanery sustained only minor damage. During the bombings, the cellar provided shelter for the populace, albeit with initial reluctance from the owner.

The building sustained damage during the storm on 26 December 1999. Scientific interest in the building began in 2000 after a new mutation was discovered, prompting the owners to open it to the public and researchers. The deanery is open for visits regularly, including during the European Heritage Days. Further research was carried out in October 2013.

The entire deanery, along with the plot of land, was classified as a historical monument by a decree issued on 19 October 2007. A previous registration of the auditorium, along with the plot of land, was canceled by a decree on 13 October 2006.

In May 2019, the building was put up for sale by the owners who had owned it since 2001.

== Architecture ==
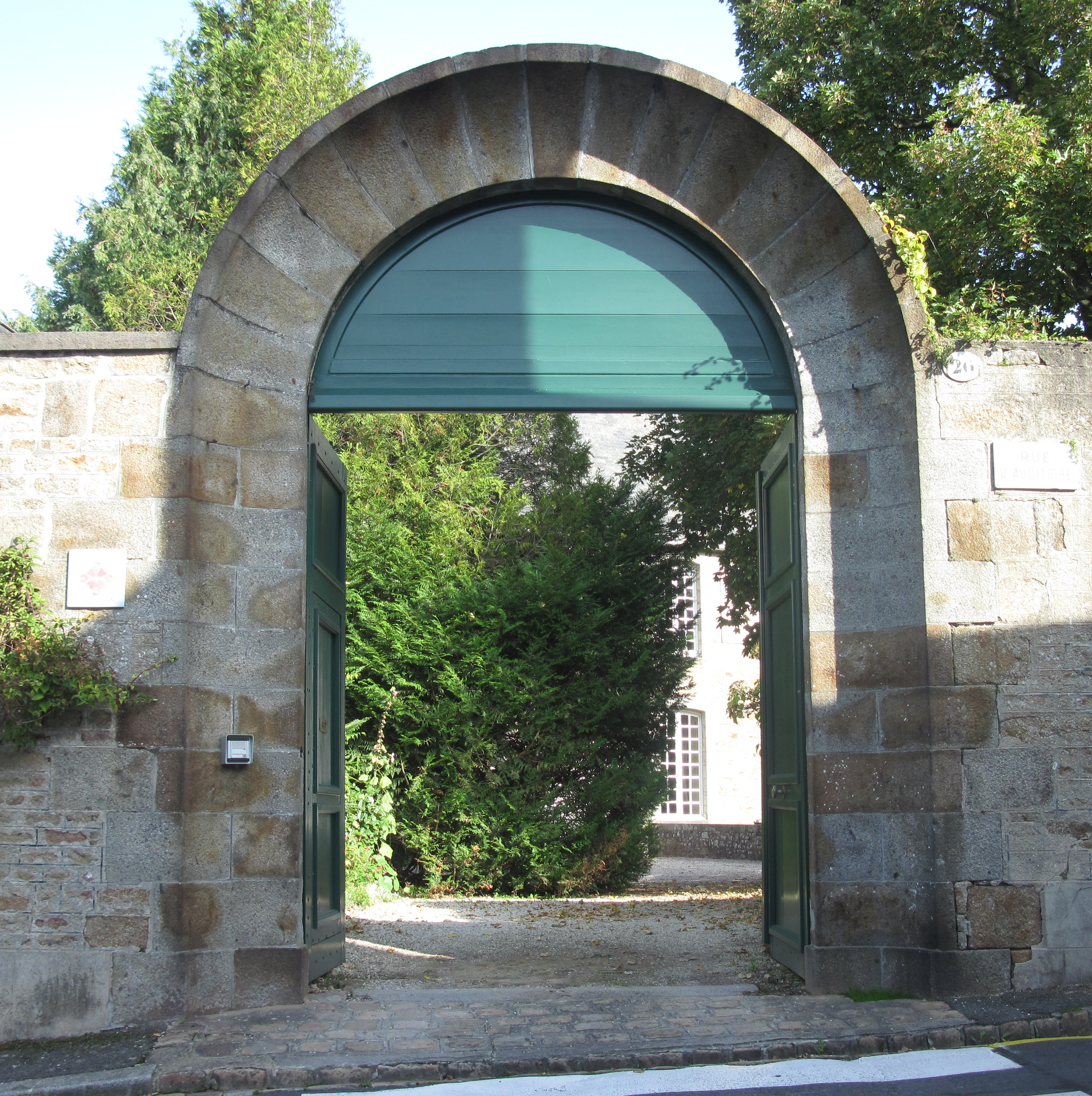
Courtyard access gate.

=== General characteristics and materials ===
The Romanesque building's primitive structure has been preserved, despite modifications made since its construction. The building is supported by the rock on the side facing Rue de l'Auditoire and by a fill on the courtyard side.

The north wall has preserved its medieval features, such as flat buttresses and an access door to the lower hall. The wall is constructed of typical granite rubble masonry, with the buttresses and quoins made of regularly dimension stones. Some reused stones exhibit fire damage. The quality of the construction is attributed more to the mortar and masonry work than to the materials themselves. The lower hall wall is 2.26 meters thick. The gable wall still maintains its medieval elevation, with a roof slope more pronounced than its original design.

=== Frame and roofing ===
The frame is characteristic of the late 15th century, comprising eight bays and seven bents. It features numbered purlins, indicating the organized "construction process." The wood used during that period was of low quality due to "extensive deforestation," leading to design flaws in the frame.

The building has had several types of roofing over the years. The first may have been made of beveled tiles, followed by two stages with a slate roof. The current roof is made of high-quality Angers slate.

=== Volumes ===
The building originally measured 28 × 14 meters, with a large hall area of 230 m^{2}. The current total area of the building is 550 m^{2}.

The side wall has a height of 13.50 meters.

The original state room was divided into two levels in the 15th and 16th centuries BCE. The ogival windows transformed; the first level was equipped with mullioned windows, while the upper level was lit by modest openings.

=== Lower hall ===
Ground level (0). c. 1150: lower room (A), chamber-block (B) c. 1270: Petit Doyenné (C) c. 1500: kitchen (D) and partition wall parcel 21, rue de Lille c. 1150: backfill under the courtyard c. 1270: backfill under the Petit Doyenné modern property line

The lower hall or cellar consists of two naves and measures 22.50 × 9.50 meters with a vault height of 4.20 meters. It contains four bays and features a Romanesque door that allows access to the large hall situated at a higher level. The lower hall has remained largely unchanged since its construction.

The hall had double embrasure windows for lighting. Additionally, there was a water point in the hall, a basin of 0.50 meters deep supplied by upwellings through faults in the rock. The lower hall underwent renovations dating from the late 13th to the 15th century to enable the Petit Doyenné to have direct access to this storage area.

=== Circulation ===
The building features a spiral staircase in the northeast, dating back to the original construction. This staircase has partially collapsed, likely due to the destruction of the Petit Doyenné. The door connecting the cellar to the staircase resembles those found in Romanesque religious buildings in the region but is a unique example used in civil architecture. The staircase originally led to a walkway designed for "visual control of the entire area" and was not for defensive purposes. A guard rail, now only partially preserved, was originally present.

=== Level 1: State room ===
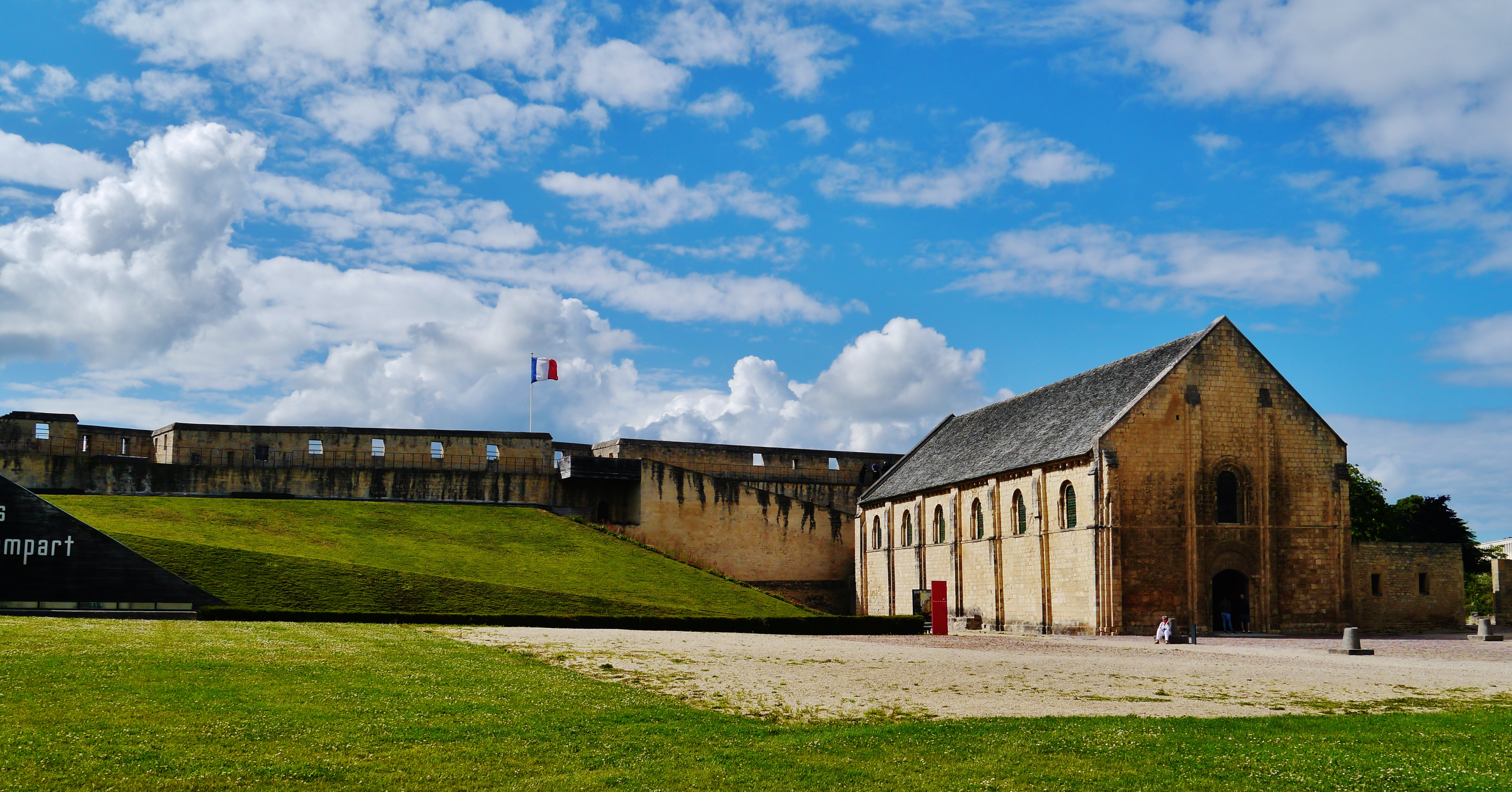
Overview of the Exchequer building (right) at the Château de Caen

The room originally measured 230 m^{2} and has four windows dating back to the 13th century in its current configuration, although they were modified in the 15th century. There were also openings on the gables, but they have since been blocked.

Research has not revealed any traces of fireplaces, latrines or washbasins. The hall of the chessboard in the castle of Caen, a fairly comparable building, initially had only a central hearth and no fireplace.

In terms of decorative elements, fragments of white painted plaster with false red jointing have been discovered. A "scattering of red flowers on a white background" was observed in the staircase turret. The examination of the eastern wall of the building also uncovered a passage between the Petit Doyenné and the large hall, which is currently sealed off.

== Part of a manorial complex and interpretation ==
=== Missing Elements: Lordly hall and Petit Doyenné ===
Deanery's first level and the location of the complex's missing elements. c. 1150: great hall (A), chamber-block (B) c. 1270: Petit Doyenné (C) c. 1500: kitchen (D) c. 1760: facade renovation courtyard and great hall parcel 21, rue de Lille 1a, 1b, 2 and 3: access roads built around 1150 4: access built around 1270 modern property line

A residential building for the lord, known as the "chamber-block" by British archaeologists, was situated nearby. This type of building typically consisted of two levels. Adjacent to the deanery plot in the southeast direction, a mound stands one meter high with remnants of the roof, still preserved up to a height of three meters. The building was positioned just seven meters away from the corner of the Grand Doyenné. The presence of a door suggests that it was constructed around the same time as the latter building. The lower part of the structure was used for "domestic functions," while the upper floor, slightly elevated above the courtyard, may have served as the lord's chamber. An archaeological excavation could reveal more details about "this manorial complex, which holds significant archaeological potential."

The complex probably did not have a chapel because there was already one designated for the Subligny family in the cathedral, which was located just fifty meters away at the time.

A kitchen was likely present from the beginning, but its exact location has yet to be discovered. Nicolas-Méry suggests it was situated where the kitchen dated from the late Middle Ages was built on one of the roofs.

One final element, known as the Petit Doyenné, was constructed after 1270, following the building of a fill. A flashing can be seen in the roof wall, along with a window that was filled in during the construction of this building. The level of the Petit Doyenné corresponded to the level of the large hall of the Grand Doyenné.

=== Exceptionally preserved element of a complex adapted to new uses ===
All these elements, including those that have disappeared, from the medieval period, suggest the existence of a manorial complex. Nicolas-Méry's research suggested the building is a well-preserved secular lordly residence from the 12th century. The owners were keen on "asserting their power within the fortified episcopal city" and controlled trade, which was their main source of income.

Nicolas-Méry suggests the hypothesis that the complex was gradually repurposed: the lodging may have been converted into the bailiwick's auditorium or relocated at a later time. The large hall, on the other hand, could have functioned as a chapter hall or for dispensing alms to the poor. The lower hall was used for storing goods, including locally produced wine.

== The Grand Doyenné in cinema ==
The location was used for filming a television film in 1966 starring Alice Sapritch, Le Chevalier Des Touches.

== See also ==
- Château de Caen
- Avranches

== Annexes ==
=== Bibliography ===
- Nicolas-Méry, David (2013a). Le "Grand Doyenné" d'Avranches, une résidence aristocratique au fil des siècles (in French). Cully: Société des antiquaires de Normandie. ISBN 9782919026111.
- Nicolas-Méry, David (2004). "Le « Grand Doyenné » à Avranches, résidence urbaine des seigneurs de Subligny". Revue de l'Avranchin et du Pays de Granville (in French) (81): 135–165.
- Nicolas-Méry, David (2013b). "Avranches – Le Grand Doyenné". ADLFI. Archéologie de la France - Informations (in French) (3353). doi:10.4000/adlfi.16692.
- Nicolas-Méry, David (2003). "Manche. Avranches, le « Grand Doyenné »". Bulletin Monumental (in French). 161 (161–3): 247–249. doi:10.3406/bulmo.2003.1224.

=== External links ===
- Architectural resource: "Mérimée" (in French).
- Moisson, Anthony (14 May 2018). "Avranches. Le Grand Doyenné, plus vieille maison de la ville". ouest-france.fr (in French).
- "Avranches. Quel passionné de bâtisses anciennes pour le Grand doyenné ?". ouest-france.fr (in French). 11 April 2019.
- "À Avranches, la doyenne de la ville est à vendre !". france3-regions.francetvinfo.fr (in French). 6 May 2019.
- Le Grand Doyenné d'Avranches, une résidence aristocratique au fil des siècles. Visite commentée de la propriété et séance de dédicaces, dimanche 16 juin 2013 (Video) (in French).
