= St Martin-in-the-Fields (disambiguation) =

St Martin-in-the-Fields is a church in London, England.

St Martin-in-the-Fields, and similar, may also refer to:

- St Martin-in-the-Fields (painting), an 1888 painting by William Logsdail
- St Martin-in-the-Fields (parish), a civil parish abolished in 1922
- St Martin-in-the-Fields High School for Girls
- Academy of St Martin in the Fields, a chamber orchestra
- St Martin-in-the-Fields, a church in Finham, Coventry

== See also ==
- Saint-Martin-des-Champs (disambiguation)
