= Basilica of Saint Gervasius and Protasius, Avranches =

Basilica in Normandy, France

- Basilique Saint-Gervais-et-Saint-Protais d'Avranches
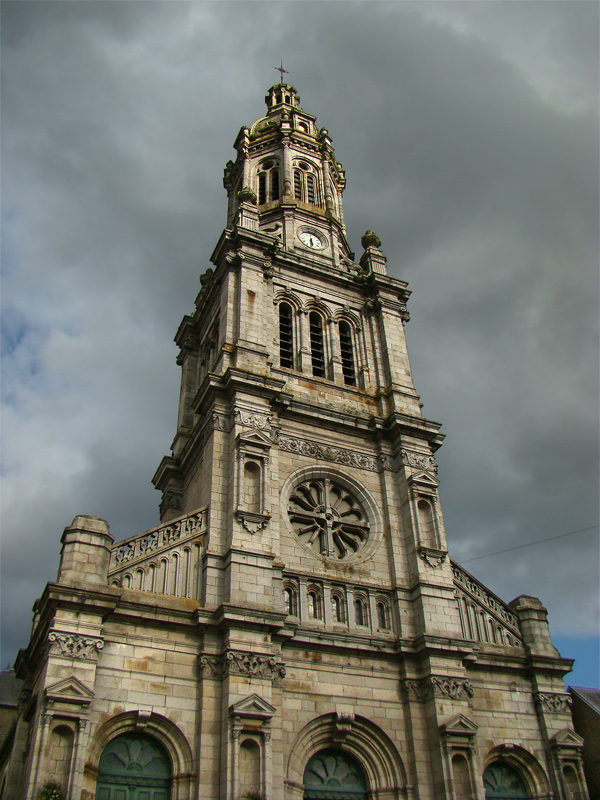
- Basilica of Saint Gervasius and Protasius, Avranches
- 48.68649°N 1.35831°W
- Location: Avranches, Manche, Normandy, France
- Denomination: Catholic

History
- Dedication: Saints Gervasius and Protasius

Architecture
- Functional status: active
- Heritage designation: Monument historique
- Designated: 2006
- Architectural type: Minor basilica
- Years built: 1843-1865

Administration
- Diocese: Coutances and Avranches

The Basilica of Saint Gervasius and Protasius, Avranches (French: Basilique Saint-Gervais-et-Saint-Protais d'Avranches) is a neo-classic, Catholic minor basilica, erected by Pope Leo XIII, which is located in the French commune of Avranches, in the department of Manche, in the Normandy region of France.

== History ==
The old Saint-Gervais church dated from the mid-17th century. The parish is mentioned as early as the 7th century.

The building underwent a major restoration campaign in 2010, forcing the town hall to close it for twenty months. It was reopened for worship and to the public in September 2011.

== Description ==
The neo-Renaissance style basilica, built between 1843 and 1865, has a Latin cross plan, with the transept arms ending in a hemicycle.

== Status ==
The entire church is listed as a monument historique by decree of February 16, 2006.
