= Aubert of Avranches =

8th century bishop of Avranches

Saint Aubert
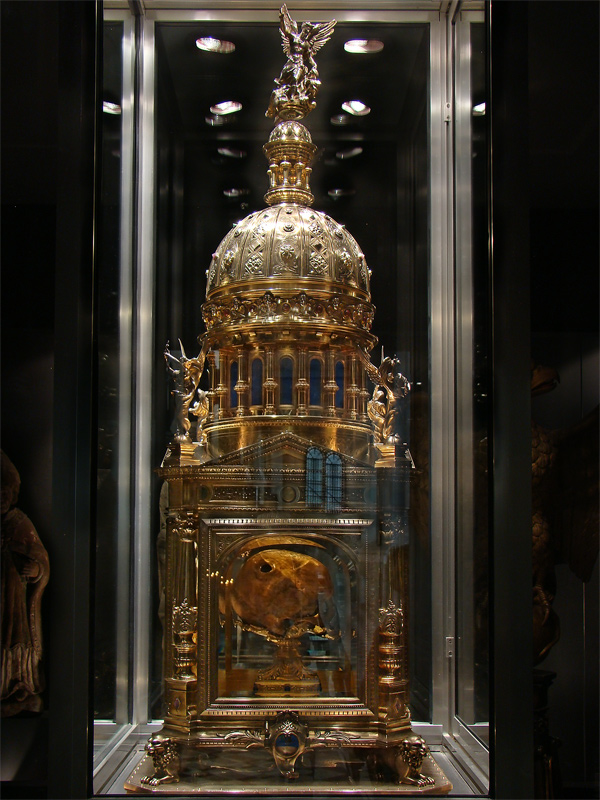
- Saint Aubert's skull at the Saint-Gervais Basilica
- Died: 720 AD
- Venerated in: Catholic Church; Eastern Orthodox Church
- Major shrine: Church of S Gervais in Avranches
- Feast: 10 September

Saint Aubert, also known as Saint Autbert, was bishop of Avranches in the 8th century and is credited with founding Mont Saint-Michel.

== Life ==
Aubert lived in France during the reign of Childebert III (695–711) and died about 720. He was born of a noble family from Genetas, and received an extensive education. When the See of Avranches became vacant, Aubert, known for his wisdom and piety, was chosen bishop.

== Legend ==
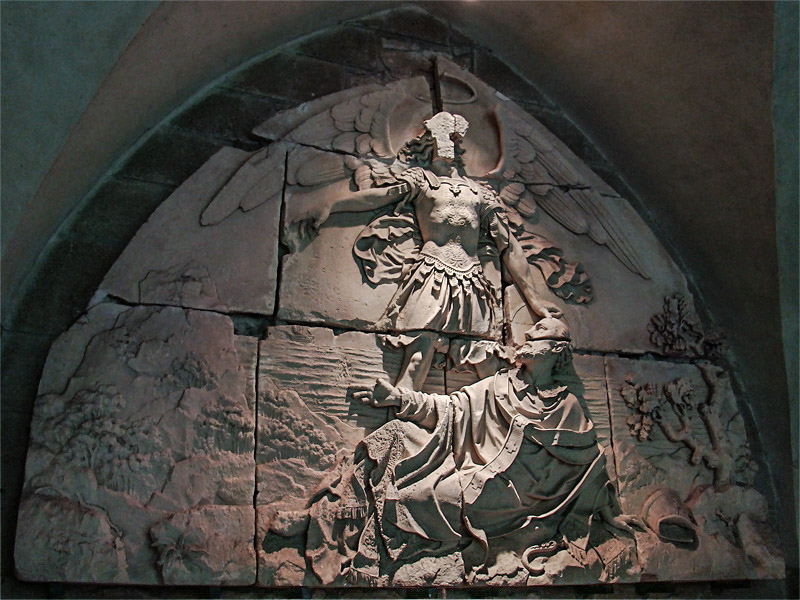
Saint Aubert's dream

In 708 Aubert had a vision in which the Archangel Michael instructed him to build an oratory on the rocky tidal island at the mouth of the Couesnon. Aubert did not pay attention to this vision at first, doubting it was a true vision. The archangel appeared a second time, but still Aubert hesitated, lest this be a demonic manifestation. At last in exasperation Michael appeared to him again, this time poking him in his head and ordering him to complete the task. Where the archangel touched him, Aubert was left with a hole in his skull. After this the oratory was built. It was dedicated on 16 October 709. Here he at first established canons; then the Benedictines. Aubert is reputed to have been buried at the oratory.

The relic of Aubert's skull, complete with hole where the archangel's finger pierced it, can still be seen at the Saint-Gervais Basilica in Avranches. Skeptics suggest that the skull is in fact a historic relic showing evidence of trepanation.

Aubert is regarded as a saint in the Catholic Church, with a feast day of 10 September.

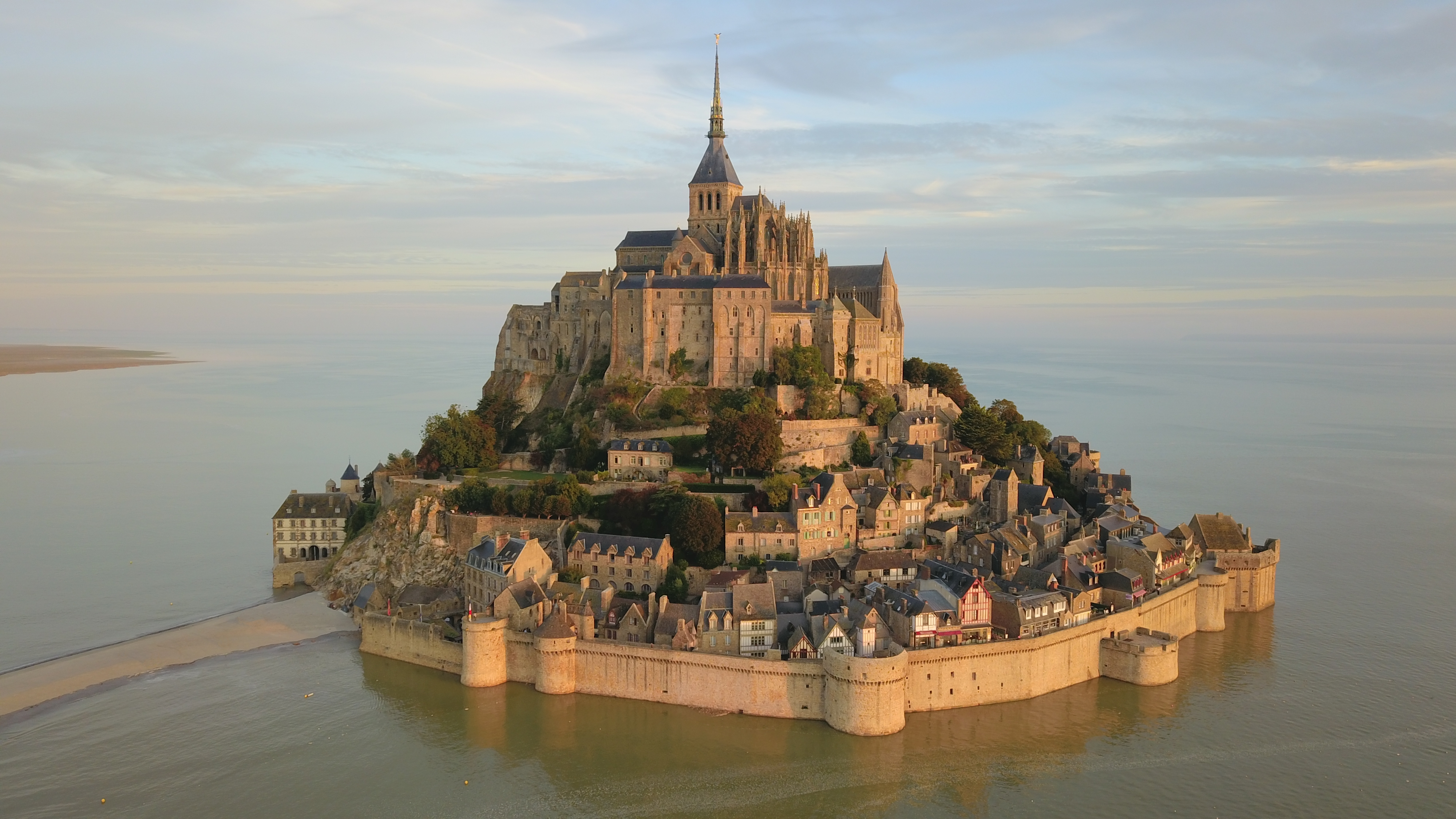
Aubert was ordered by the archangel Michael to start construction of what became Mont-Saint-Michel
