= Jean-Marie Valhubert =

Jean-Marie Mellon Roger
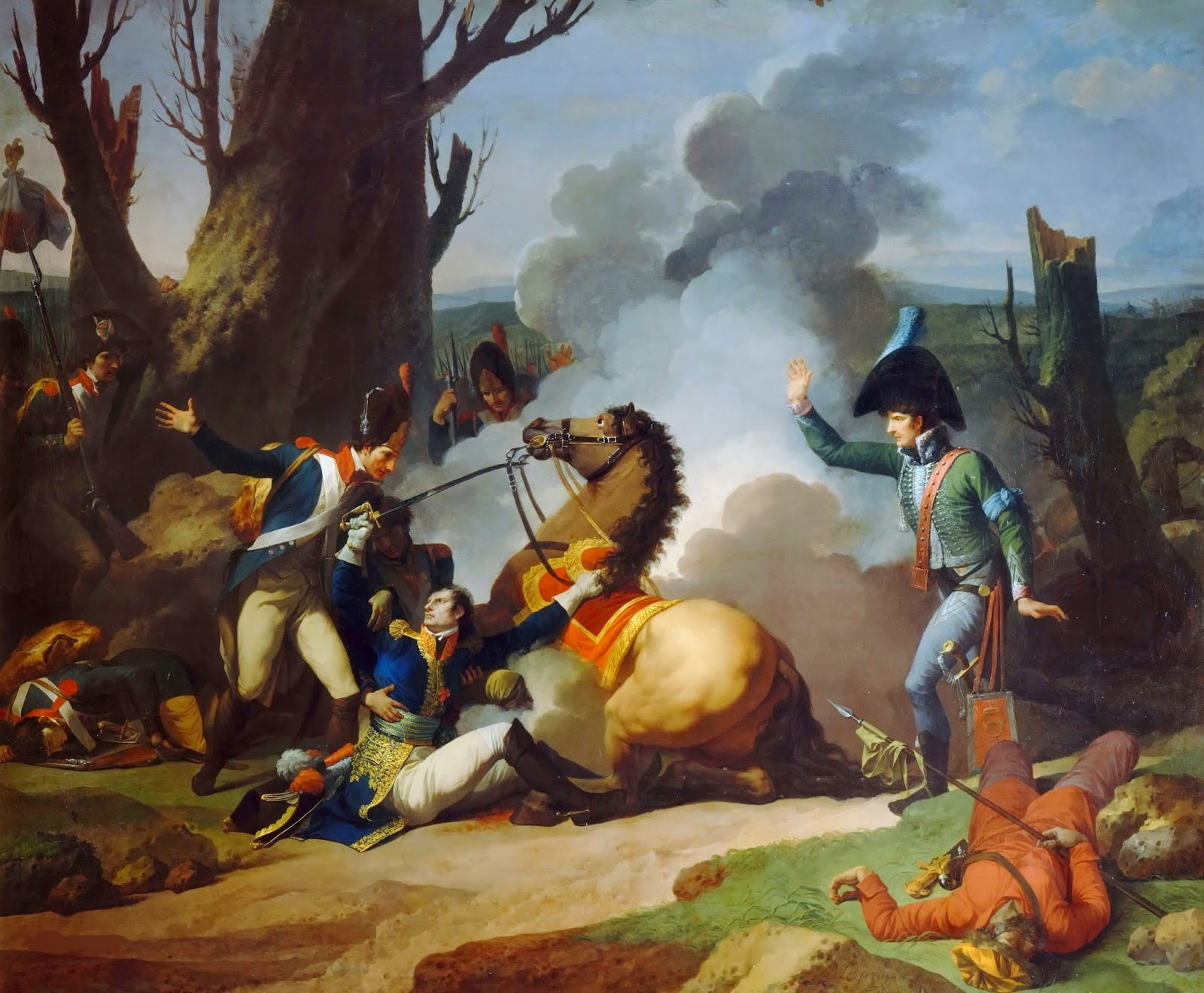
- Born: 22 October 1764; Avranches, Manche
- Died: 3 December 1805 (aged 41); Austerlitz, Austria
- Occupation: General

Jean-Marie Mellon Roger, (French pronunciation: [ʒɑ̃ maʁi mɛlɔ̃ ʁɔʒe valybɛʁ]) better known as le général Valhubert, was born on 22 October 1764 in Avranches, Normandy, and died on 3 December 1805 in Brünn. He was a French General during the French Revolution.

Before he attained twenty years of age, he enrolled in the Rohan-Soubise Regiment. During the beginning of the French Revolution, he returned to his family.

In 1791, the first battalion of the Manche, elected him as their leader on 22 October. He conducted this battalion, which was attached to the Northern Army, with which he conducted his military campaigns in 1792 and 1793.

As superior officer, he was noticed in Lille, in Antwerp, and in Lawfeld; was made a prisoner of war in Quesnoy on 13 September 1793 and was taken to Hungary. He was exchanged during year IV of the French Republican Calendar, and served in the interior army until its suppression, but remained in Paris, from the month of vendémiaire of year V to the 30th of germinal, year VII, as leader of the half-brigade during the Battle of Montebello (1800).

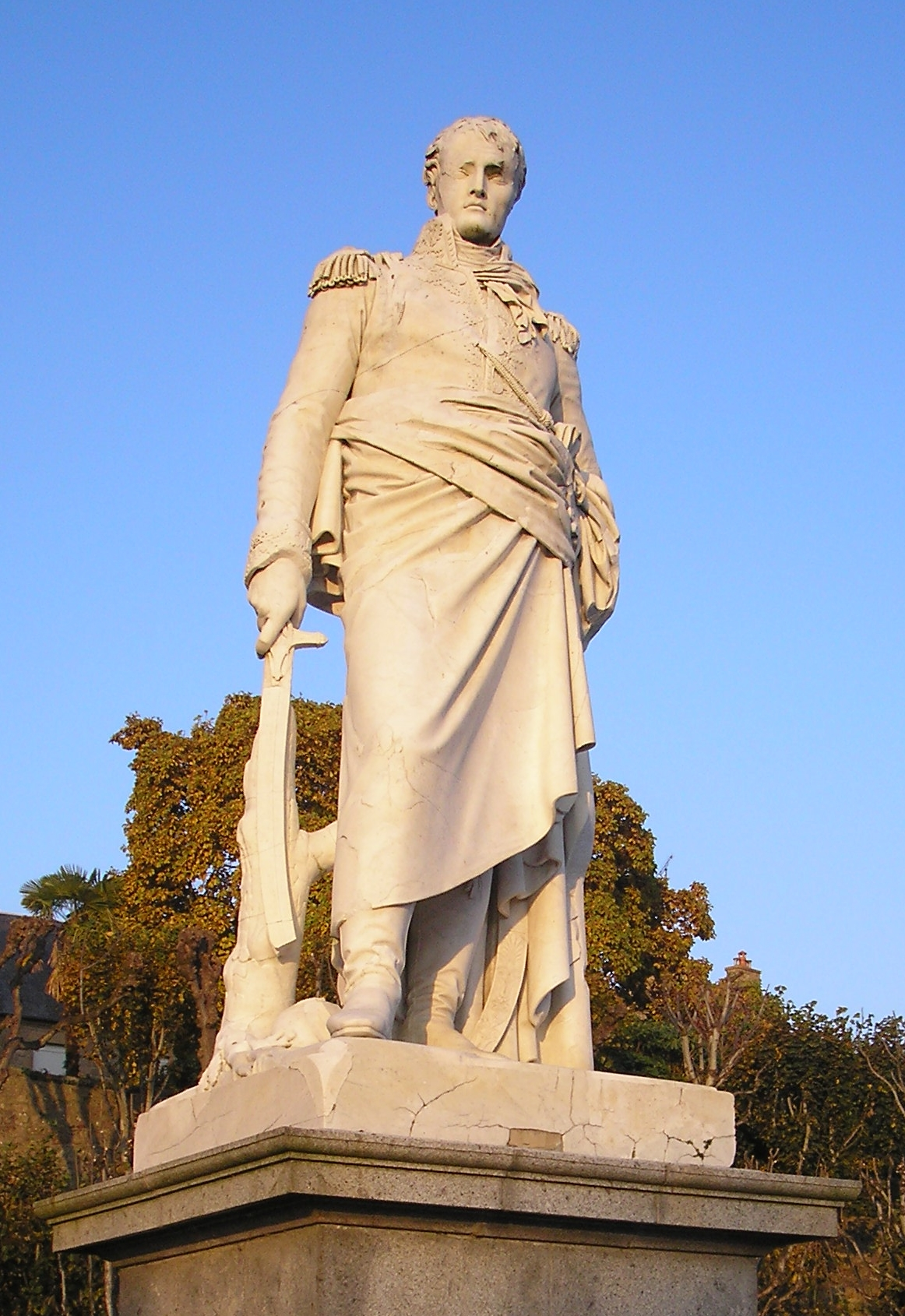
Statue of General Valhubert at Avranches (by Cartelier)

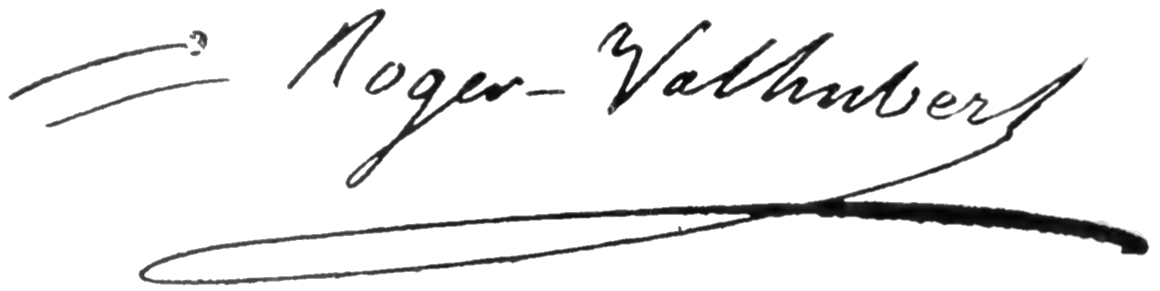
Signature

In 1805, during the Battle of Austerlitz, which was commanded by Suchet, he had his leg fractured by a shell. He fell and was incapable of getting up until soldiers came to get him. He died of his wounds five days later after this battle, where he had remained at his post with the fractured leg. His comrades erected a monument for him in the plains of Moravia. The Emperor Napoleon accomplished his last wishes after his death. He took charge of the family of the General, and ordered that a monument be erected in his name where he was wounded; that a new square in Paris be given his name; and that a marble statue be erected. Charles X gave the statue to his native city in 1828, and inaugurated in Avranches on 16 September 1832.

His name is inscribed at the Arc de Triomphe, and on a tables of brass at the Galerie des batailles at the château de Versailles.
