= Avranches =

- Subprefecture and commune
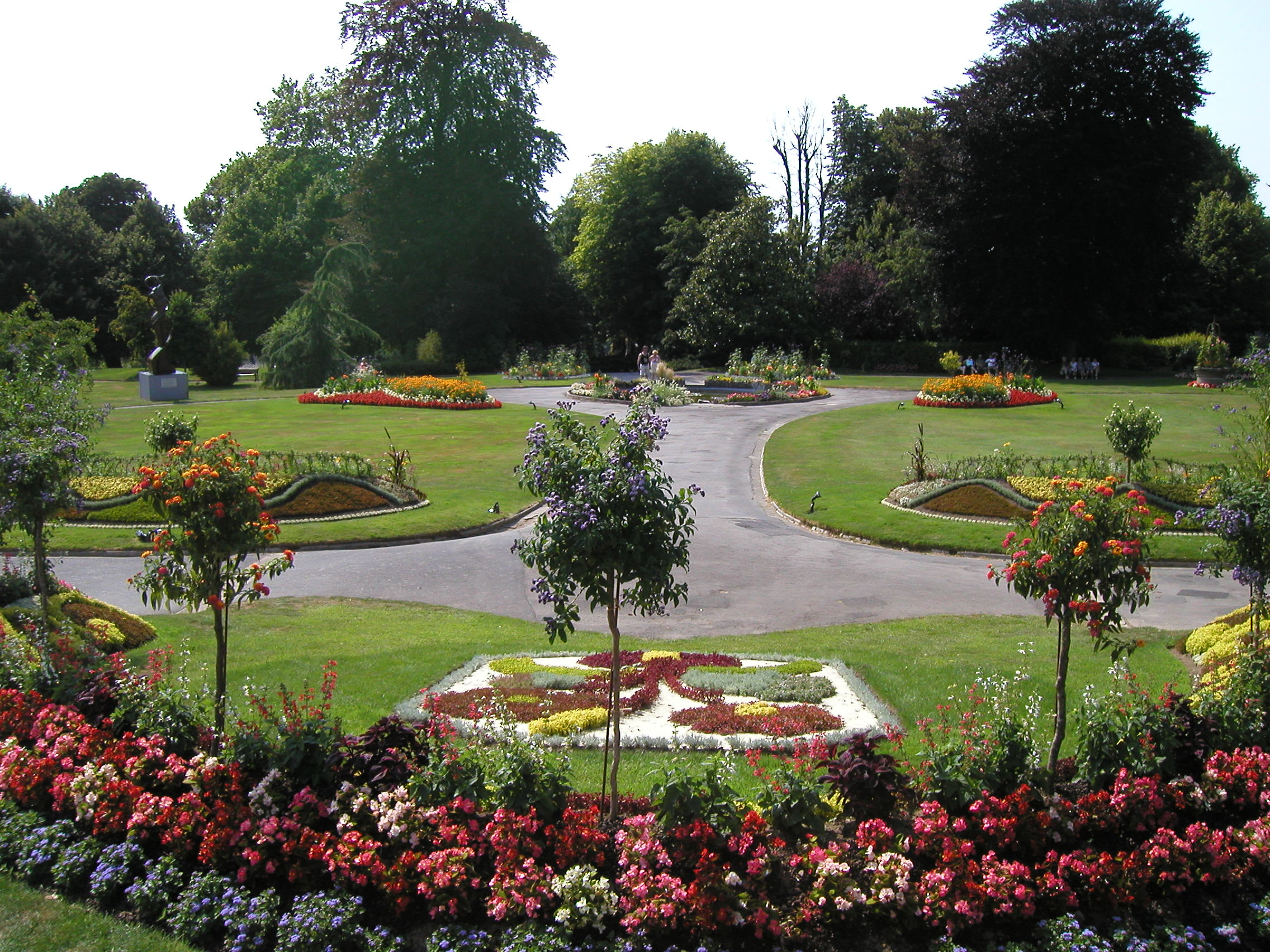
- Botanical garden

- Coat of arms
- Location of Avranches
- Location within France Location within Normandy
- Coordinates: 48°41′06″N 1°21′20″W
- Country: France
- Region: Normandy
- Department: Manche
- Arrondissement: Avranches
- Canton: Avranches and Isigny-le-Buat
- Intercommunality: CA Mont-Saint-Michel-Normandie

Government
  - Mayor (2020–2026): David Nicolas
- Area^{1}: 10.99 km^{2} (4.24 sq mi)
- Highest elevation: 111 m (364 ft)
- Lowest elevation: 7 m (23 ft)
- Population (2023): 10,143
  - Density: 922.9/km^{2} (2,390/sq mi)
- Time zone: UTC+01:00 (CET)
  - Summer (DST): UTC+02:00 (CEST)
- INSEE/Postal code: 50025 /50300
- ^{1} French Land Register data, which excludes lakes, ponds, glaciers > 1 km^{2} (0.386 sq mi or 247 acres) and river estuaries.

Avranches (French pronunciation: [avʁɑ̃ʃ]; Norman: Avraunches) is a commune in the Manche department, and the region of Normandy, northwestern France. It is a subprefecture of the department. The inhabitants are called Avranchinais.

== History ==
=== Middle Ages ===
By the end of the Roman period, the settlement of Ingena, capital of the Abrincatui tribe, had taken the name of the tribe itself. This was the origin of the name Avranches. In 511 the town became the seat of a diocese (suppressed in 1790) and subsequently of a major Romanesque cathedral dedicated to Saint Andrew, Avranches Cathedral, which was dismantled during the French revolutionary period. As the region of Brittany emerged from the Roman region of Armorica, Avranchin was briefly held by Alan I, King of Brittany as part of the Kingdom of Brittany at the turn of the 10th century. The regions that later became the Duchies of Normandy and Brittany each experienced devastating Viking raids, with Brittany occupied by Vikings from 907 to 937. In 933 Avranches and its territory, the Avranchin, were ceded to the Normans.

Hugh d'Avranches, 1st Earl of Chester, a magnate under William the Conqueror, was the son of Richard le Goz, Vicomte d'Avranches.

In 1172 (September 27–28) a council was held at Avranches in response to the murder of Anglo-Norman Saint Thomas Becket. Henry II, King of England, after due penance done at Avranches on 21 May 1172, was absolved from the censures incurred by the assassination of the holy prelate and reached the Compromise of Avranches with the Church, swearing fidelity to Pope Alexander III in the person of the papal legate.

The same council was forbidden to confer on children benefice, carrying with it the cure of souls, or on the children of priests for the churches of their fathers. Each parish was required to have an assistant (vicarius), and the Advent fast was commended to all who could observe it, especially to ecclesiastics.

The town was damaged in both the Hundred Years' War and the Wars of Religion.

Álvaro Vaz de Almada was made 1st Count of Avranches by King Henry VI of England on August 8, 1444.

=== Modern era ===
The town lost some influence after the French Revolution during which the diocese was abolished, the bailif was removed and primary and secondary schools were closed. The town was also occupied and raided by troops both pro-republican and anti-revolutionary (Chouans). However, in 1802 the Avranches diocese was restored as part of the Diocese of Coutances.

Many English families settled here after the Treaty of Paris (1814).

A literary description of the town in the 19th century is recorded in Guy de Maupassant's novel Notre Cœur, when the main character Mariolle meets his lover and sets out for Mont Saint-Michel:
The houses crowning the heights gave to the place from a distance the appearance of a fortification. Seen close at hand, it was an ancient and pretty Norman city, with small dwellings of regular and almost similar appearance built closely adjoining one another, giving an aspect of ancient pride and modern comfort, a feudal yet peasant-like air.

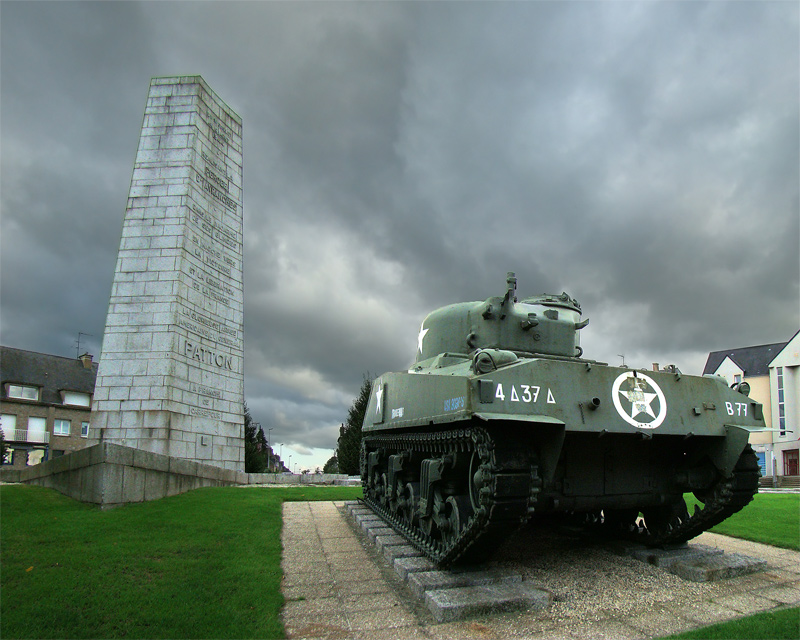
Patton Square

The liberation of Avranches during World War II was led by General George S. Patton and began on 31 July 1944. It is considered the beginning of Operation Cobra that is usually referred to "La Percée d'Avranches" in French.

On 1 January 2019, the former commune Saint-Martin-des-Champs was merged into Avranches.

== Geography ==
Avranches is situated at the southern end of the Cotentin Peninsula on the E40 road connecting Saint-Lô with Brittany and on the rail line between Lison (linking to Caen) and Dol (linking to Rennes).

The town was founded on high ground overlooking the dunes and coastal marshes along the bay forming the corner between the peninsulas of the Cotentin and Brittany. From Avranches, it is possible to see the Mont Saint-Michel, which was founded by Saint Aubert, Bishop of Avranches in the 8th century.

== Population ==
Historical population

| Year | Pop. | ±% p.a. |
|---|---|---|
| 1793 | 5,880 | — |
| 1800 | 5,413 | −1.18% |
| 1806 | 6,144 | +2.13% |
| 1821 | 6,431 | +0.30% |
| 1831 | 7,269 | +1.23% |
| 1836 | 7,690 | +1.13% |
| 1841 | 8,256 | +1.43% |
| 1846 | 7,965 | −0.72% |
| 1851 | 8,932 | +2.32% |
| 1856 | 8,702 | −0.52% |
| 1861 | 8,592 | −0.25% |
| 1866 | 8,642 | +0.12% |
| 1872 | 8,137 | −1.00% |
| 1876 | 8,157 | +0.06% |
| 1881 | 8,057 | −0.25% |
| 1886 | 8,000 | −0.14% |
| 1891 | 7,785 | −0.54% |
| 1896 | 7,845 | +0.15% |
| 1901 | 7,384 | −1.20% |

| Year | Pop. | ±% p.a. |
|---|---|---|
| 1906 | 7,360 | −0.07% |
| 1911 | 7,174 | −0.51% |
| 1921 | 6,597 | −0.83% |
| 1926 | 6,803 | +0.62% |
| 1931 | 6,881 | +0.23% |
| 1936 | 7,130 | +0.71% |
| 1946 | 7,554 | +0.58% |
| 1954 | 8,004 | +0.73% |
| 1962 | 8,854 | +1.27% |
| 1968 | 9,775 | +1.66% |
| 1975 | 10,136 | +0.52% |
| 1982 | 9,468 | −0.97% |
| 1990 | 8,638 | −1.14% |
| 1999 | 8,500 | −0.18% |
| 2007 | 8,226 | −0.41% |
| 2012 | 7,915 | −0.77% |
| 2017 | 7,785 | −0.33% |
| 2023 | 10,143 | +4.51% |

Avranches absorbed Saint-Martin-des-Champs in 2019.
Source: EHESS and INSEE (2007-2023)

== Sights ==
A museum, Le Scriptorial, houses the collection of manuscripts of Mont Saint-Michel, deposited in the municipal archives during the French Revolution. It is one of the largest collections of medieval illuminated manuscripts in France, outside national and university libraries.

Formerly dominated by the cathedral, where Henry II did penance, an open grassed area La Plate-Forme overlooking the bay towards Mont Saint-Michel displays only a few remnants of the destroyed building.

The major church Notre Dame des Champs (Avranches) was constructed in Gothic Revival style in the 19th century to restore the religious life of the town after the destruction of the cathedral. The Basilica of Saint Gervasius and Protasius, Avranches houses a treasury, best known for the purported skull of Saint Aubert complete with hole where the archangel Michael's finger pierced it (probably a prehistoric trepanned skull).

The botanical gardens were founded in the grounds of the former Franciscan convent in the late 18th century. The expansion and introduction of exotic species in the 19th century and the location of the gardens overlooking the bay made the gardens an important sight in the town.

The Manoir de Brion, an ancient Benedictine priory of Mont Saint-Michel, is located in Dragey.

Avranches is twinned with St. Helier in Jersey. On 2 March 2010 a Jersey-registered boat "Archangel" succeeded in reaching Avranches at Marcey-les-Grèves. It is believed this was the first instance of a foreign vessel reaching Avranches in modern times.

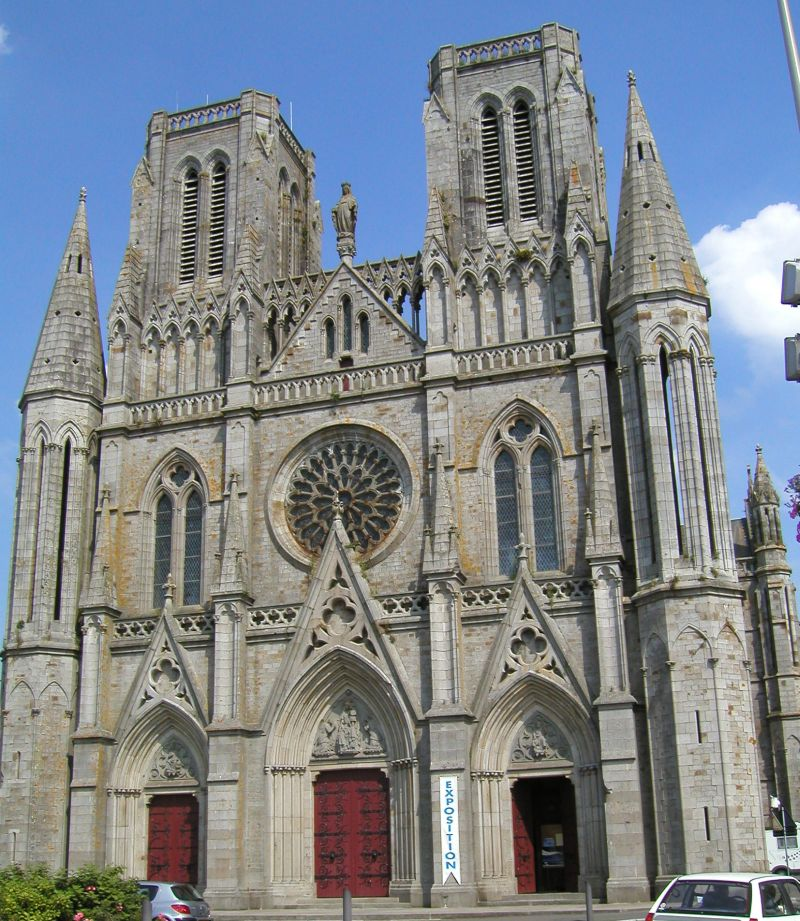
Notre Dame des Champs

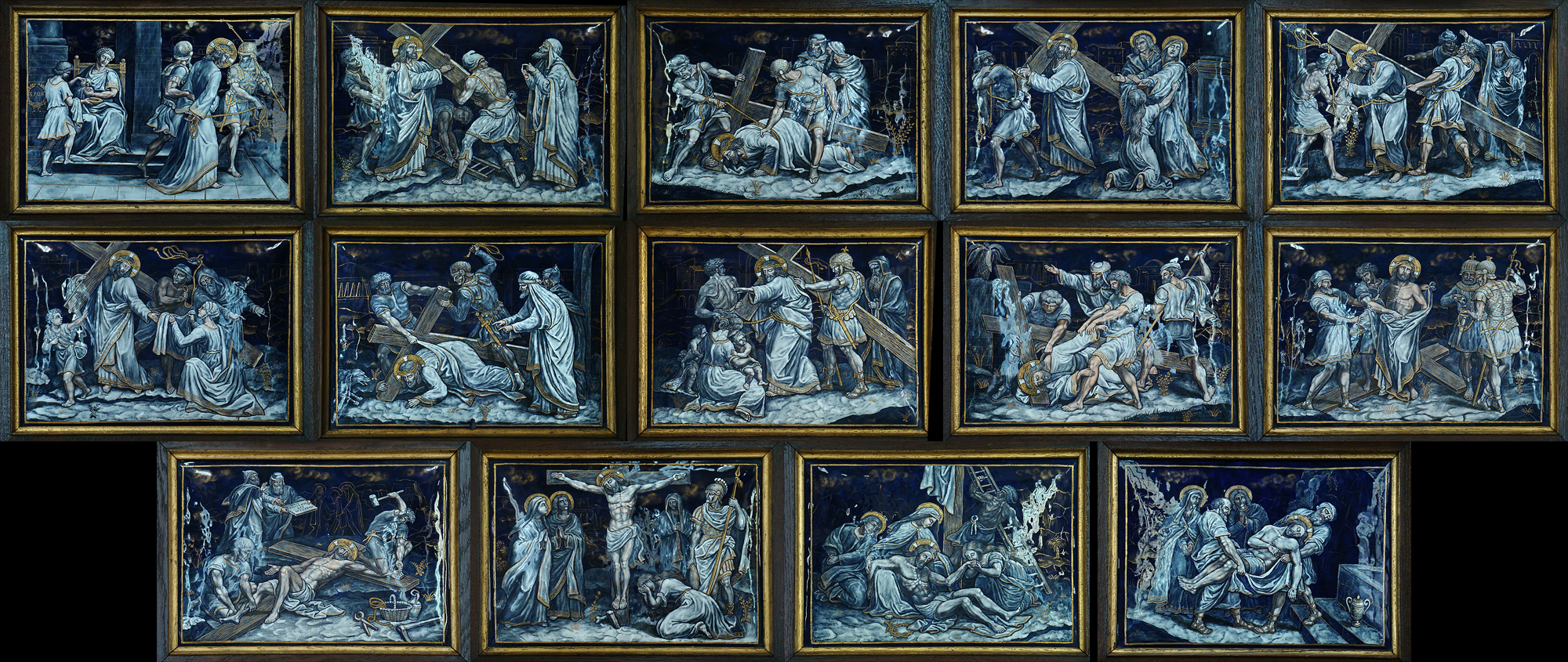
Notre-Dame-des-Champs,
Stations of the Cross

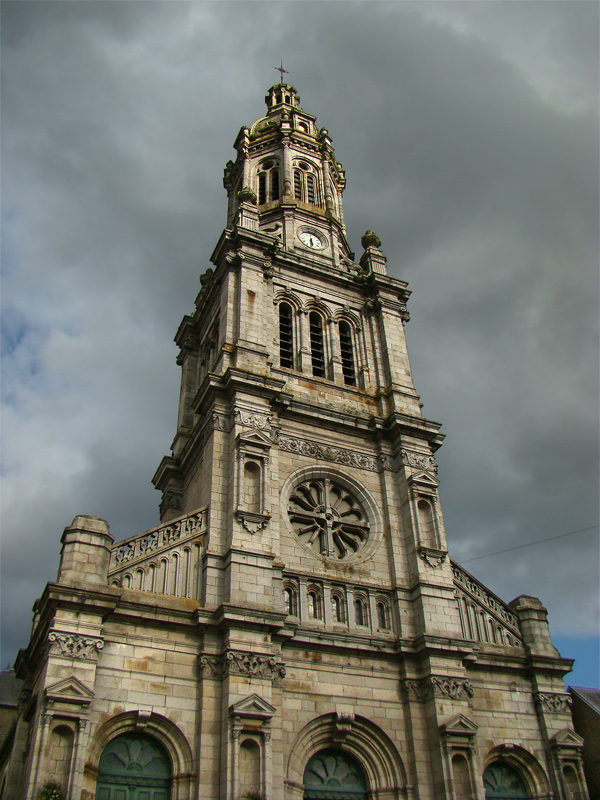
Saint-Gervais Basilica

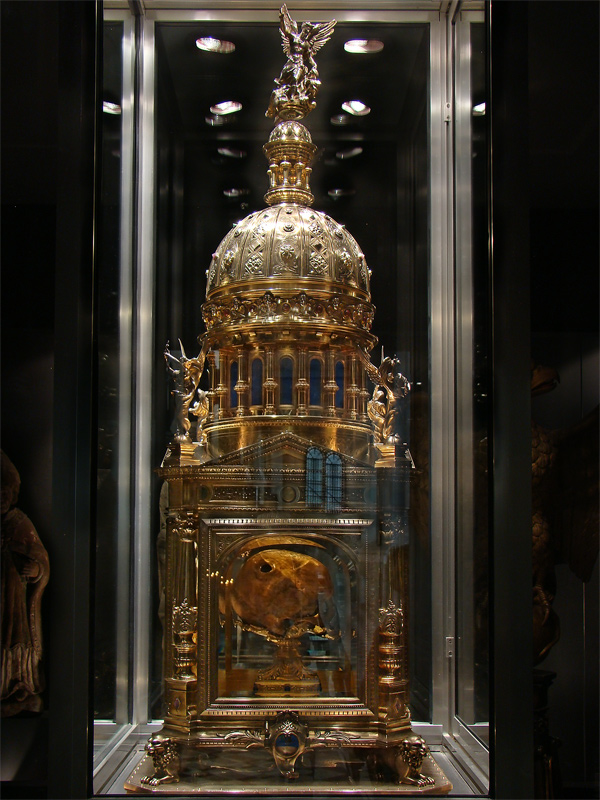
Saint-Gervais Basilica,
Skull of Saint Aubert

== Sport ==
US Avranches is a football club based in the commune, who play their home games at Stade René Fenouillère.

== Twin towns ==
- Saint-Gaudens, France, since the autumn of 1944, when the town of Saint-Gaudens, Haute-Garonne fraternally assisted Avranches by giving clothing and food to it
- Korbach, Germany, since 1963
- Saint Helier, Jersey, since 1982
- Crediton, United Kingdom, since 1993

== Births ==
Avranches was the birthplace of:

- General Jean-Marie Valhubert (1764–1805)
- Paul-Armand Challemel-Lacour (1827–1896), statesman
- Jean-Luc Ponty (born 1942), violinist and jazz composer
- Samuel Le Bihan (born 1965), a movie actor.
- Hamon de Massey, Norman lord in the barony of Chester.
- Noé Lebreton (born 2004), footballer.

== See also ==
- Grand Doyenné of Avranches
