= Château de Caen =

Castle in Caen, Normandy, France

Coordinates: 49°11′11″N 0°21′46″W

The Château de Caen is a castle in the Norman city of Caen in the Calvados département (Normandy). It has been officially classed as a Monument historique since 1997.

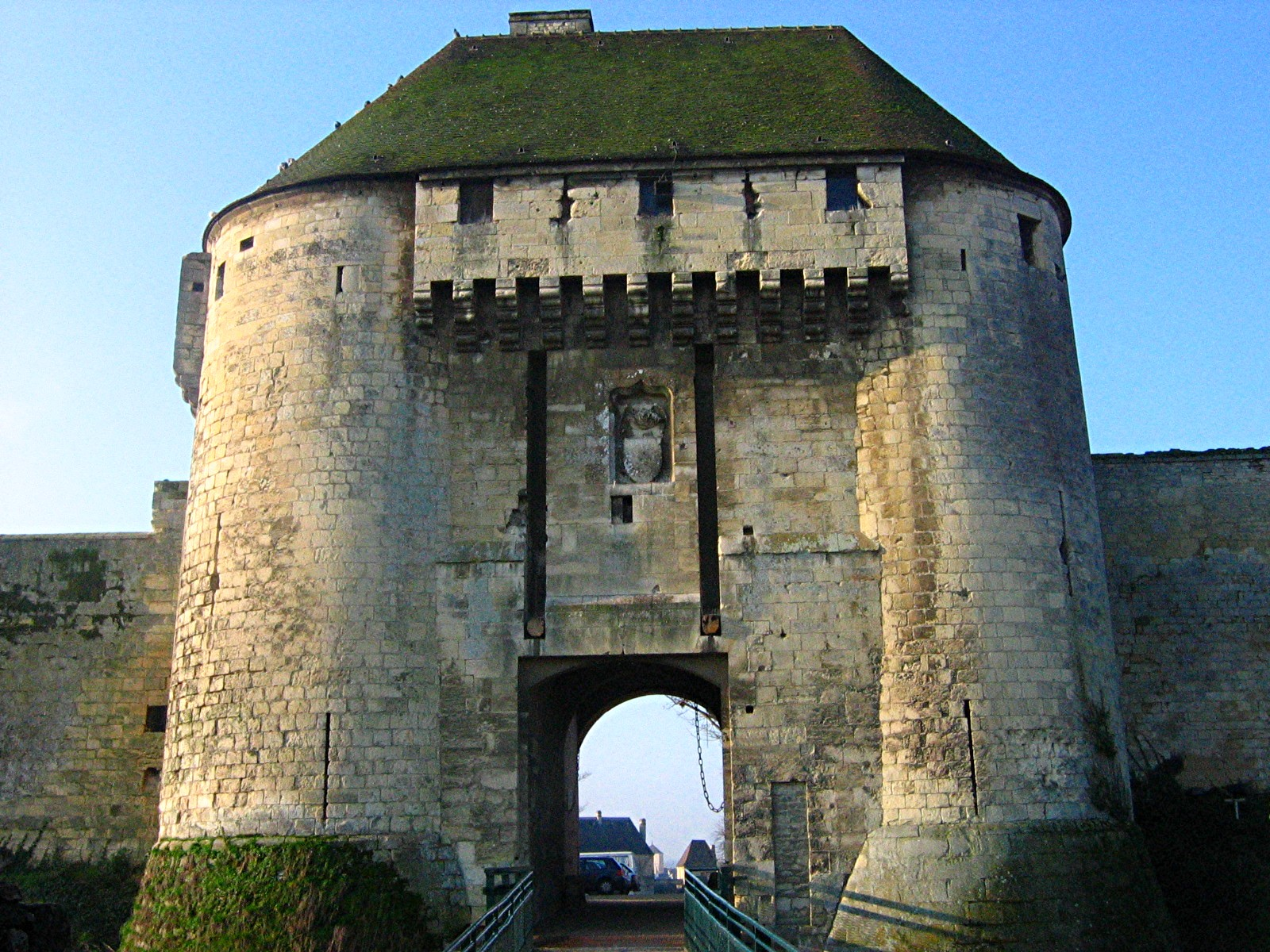
A gatehouse of the château de Caen (Porte des champs)

== History ==
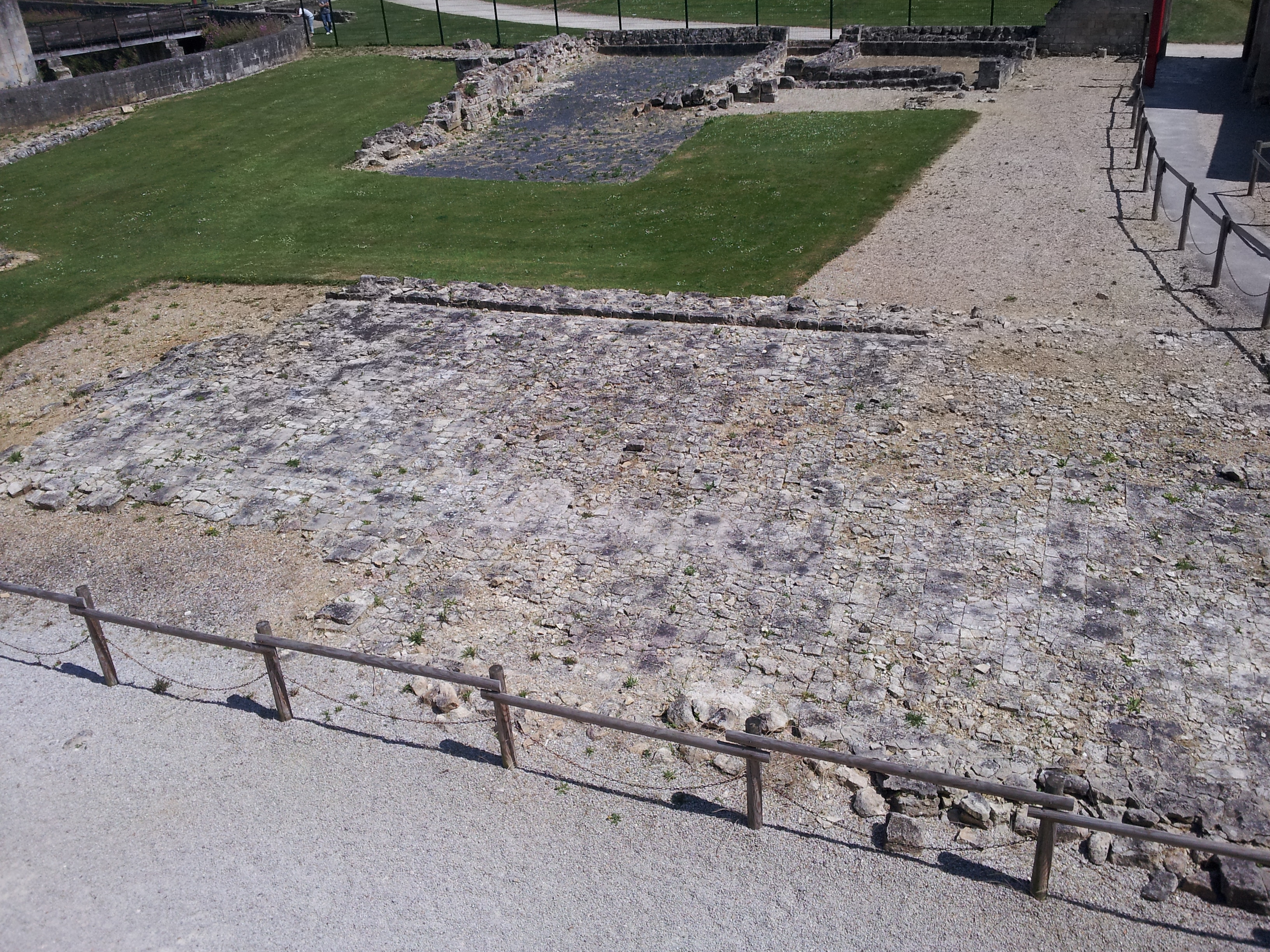
Foundations of William the Conqueror's residence c. 1060.

The castle was built c. 1060 by William the Conqueror (William of Normandy), who successfully conquered England in 1066. His son Henry I then built the Saint George's church, a keep (1123) and a large hall for the ducal Court.

On Christmas 1182, a royal court celebration for Christmas in the Aula of Caen Castle brought together Henry II and his sons, the future kings of England Richard the Lionheart and John Lackland, receiving more than a thousand knights.

Caen Castle, along with all of Normandy, was recaptured by the French Crown in 1204. Philip II reinforced the fortifications.

The castle saw several engagements during the Hundred Years' War (1346, 1417, 1450). The keep was pulled down in 1793 during the French Revolution, by order of the National Convention.

The castle, which was used as a barracks during World War II, was bombed in 1944 and seriously damaged.

In 1946, Michel de Boüard, an archeologist from Caen, decided to start excavations in the area of the castle to bring to the light medieval traces. The Musée des Beaux-Arts, which was installed in 1967, opened in 1971.

Today, visitors can gain access to a pass and tour the large castle, and explore the university located in the centre of the area.

== Structure ==
The castle was constructed on a hillock and is now in the middle of the city. With an area of 5.5 hectares, it is one of the largest castles in Western Europe. It remained an essential feature of Norman strategy and policy.

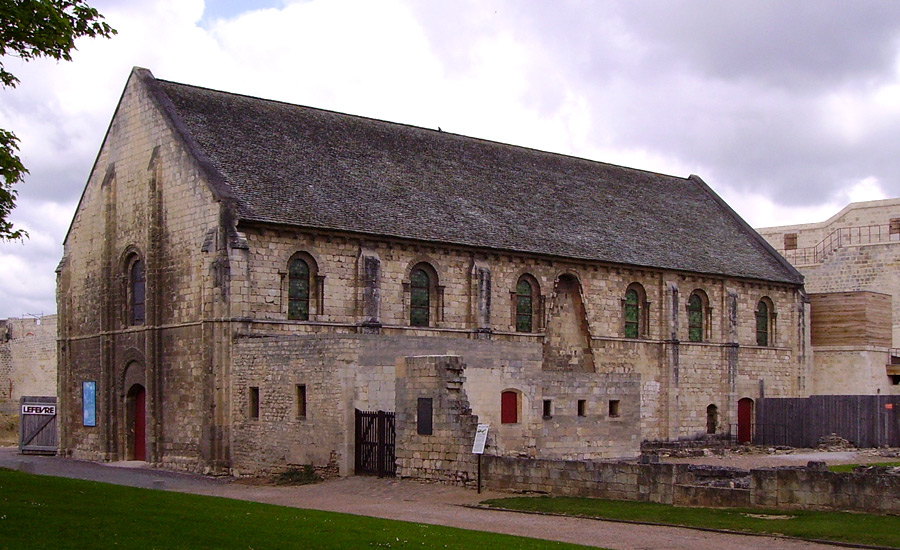
The Romanesque Exchequer of Normandy, inside the walls of the castle of Caen

Today, the castle serves as a museum that houses

- the Musée des Beaux-Arts de Caen (Museum of Fine Arts of Caen)
- the Musée de Normandie (Museum of Normandy) along with many periodical exhibitions about arts and history, in the castle residence;
- Saint George's church;
- the Échiquier de Normandie (Exchequer of Normandy), used as a temporary hall of exhibitions, which seated the Court of Normandy;
- a garden showing plants cultivated in the Middle Ages.

The keep, now razed, had a large square section with round towers at each corner. As the castle, it was also surrounded by a moat. The dry moat still provides a circuit for walkers.

The top of the ramparts offers a splendid view of Caen. Some parts of the curtain walls were built during the 12th century, but most of them date from the 15th century.

The castle has two main entrances: the porte sur la ville ('gateway to the town') and the porte des champs ('gateway to the fields'); they are reinforced by two barbicans.

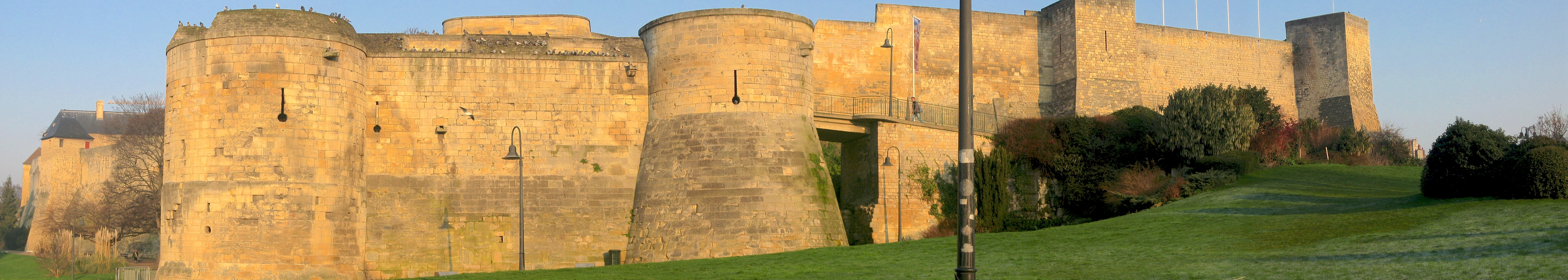
Panoramic view of the entrance of the castle (Porte sur la ville)

=== Recent works ===
Since March 2004, the town of Caen has undertaken the restoration of the ramparts, with the financial help of the ERDF (consolidation, opening of arrow slits walled-up during the 19th century) . 6,000 m³ of earth are being removed, in order to give a better view of the north-west wall of the 12th century. This operation has revealed the cellar of a private house of the 15th century which still has its firehouse, a powder magazine and two walls of a forge of the 14th century. Traces of the stables have also been found.

The base of the keep has been cleared, and people are still working on excavations around it.

== Bibliography ==
- Joseph Decaëns and Adrien Dubois (ed.), Caen Castle. A ten Centuries Old Fortress within the Town. Publications du Centre de Recherches Archéologiques et Historiques Médiévales), Turnhout: Brepols Publishers, 2010, ISBN 978-2-902685-75-2, Publications du CRAHM
- B. Guillot (éd.), Forges médiévales et écurie de la Renaissance au château de Caen. Publications du Centre de Recherches Archéologiques et Historiques Médiévales), Turnhout: Brepols Publishers, 2015 (ISBN 978-2-84133-740-8)

== See also ==
- List of castles in France
- Grand Doyenné of Avranches
