= Saint-Martin-des-Champs, Manche =

Saint-Martin-des-Champs
- Part of Avranches
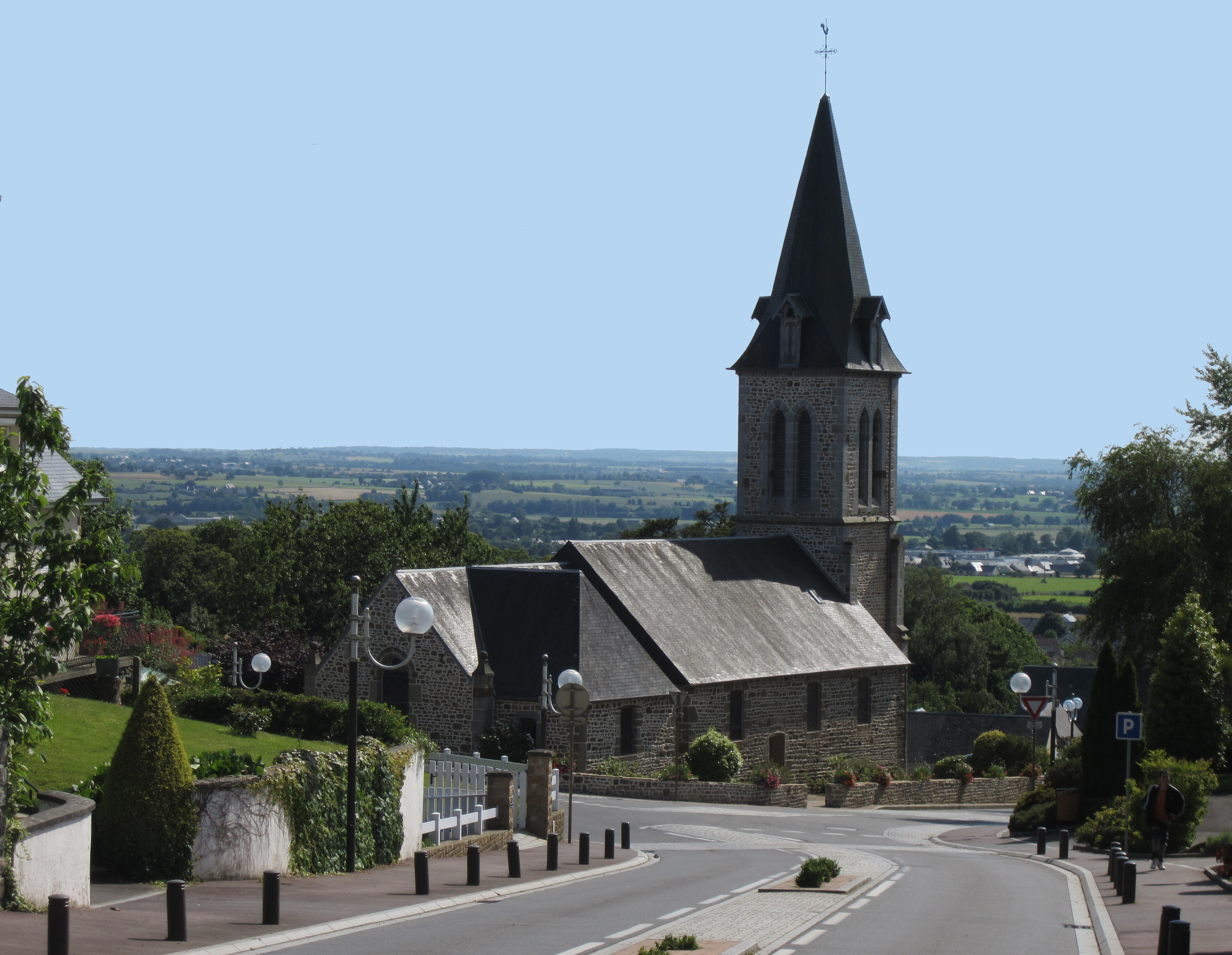
- The church of Saint-Martin
- Location of Saint-Martin-des-Champs
- Location within France Location within Normandy
- Coordinates: 48°40′13″N 1°19′48″W
- Country: France
- Region: Normandy
- Department: Manche
- Arrondissement: Avranches
- Canton: Isigny-le-Buat
- Commune: Avranches
- Area^{1}: 6.49 km^{2} (2.51 sq mi)
- Elevation: 100 m (330 ft)
- Highest elevation: 111 m (364 ft)
- Lowest elevation: 8 m (26 ft)
- Population (2022): 2,493
  - Density: 384/km^{2} (995/sq mi)
- Time zone: UTC+01:00 (CET)
  - Summer (DST): UTC+02:00 (CEST)
- Postal code: 50300
- ^{1} French Land Register data, which excludes lakes, ponds, glaciers > 1 km^{2} (0.386 sq mi or 247 acres) and river estuaries.

Saint-Martin-des-Champs (French pronunciation: [sɛ̃ maʁtɛ̃ de ʃɑ̃]) is a former commune in the Manche department in Normandy in north-western France. On 1 January 2019, it was merged into the commune Avranches.

== See also ==
- Communes of the Manche department
